= Angler's loop =

Type of knot

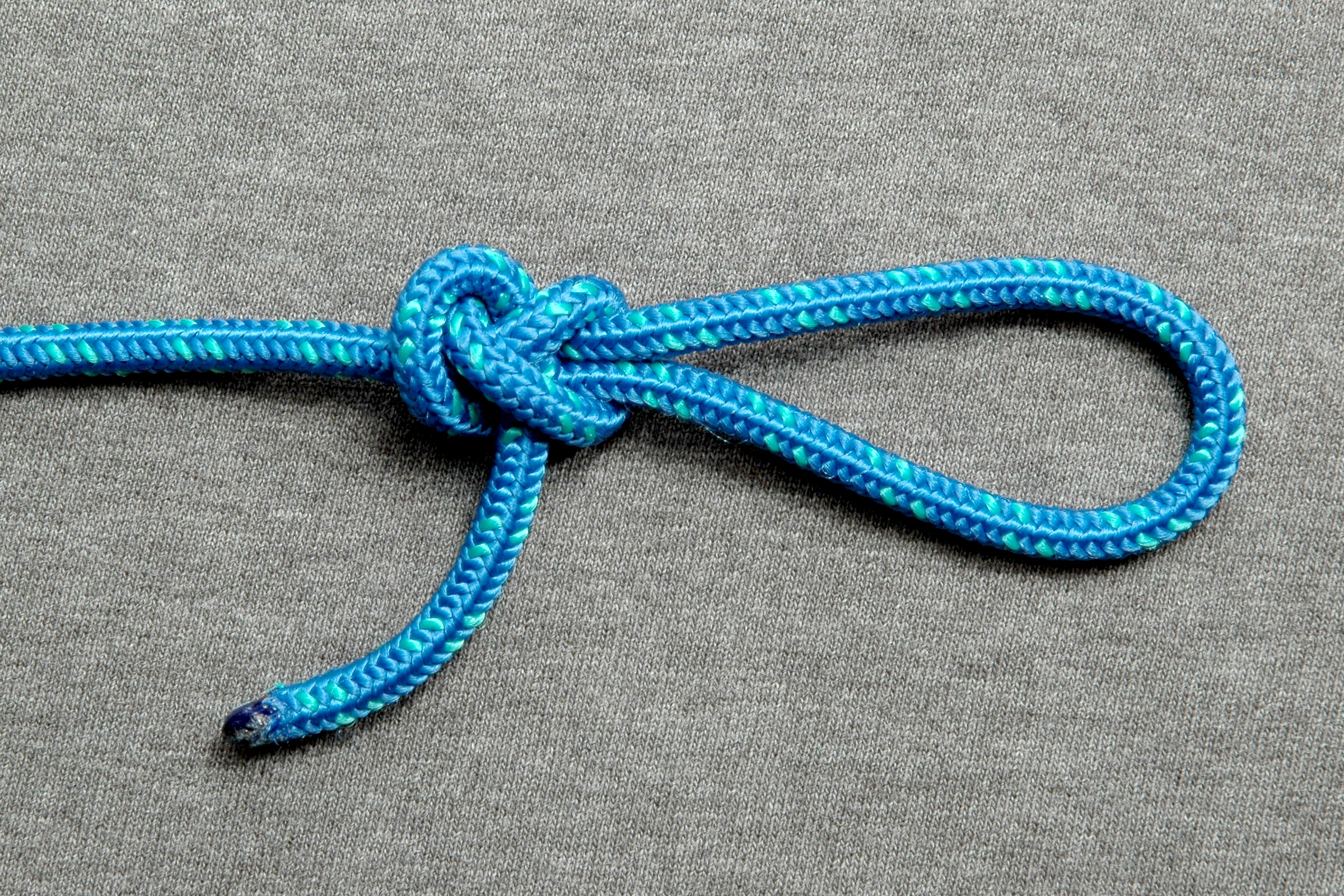
- Names: Angler's loop, Perfection loop
- Category: Loop
- Releasing: Jamming
- Typical use: Fishing, forming a fixed loop in bungee cord
- ABoK: #1017, #1035, #2067
- Instructions

An angler's loop, otherwise known as a perfection loop, is a type of knot which forms a fixed loop. Useful for fine or slippery line, it is one of the few loop knots which holds well in bungee cord. It is quite secure, but it jams badly and is not suitable if the knot will need to be untied.

== Tying ==
Angler's loop may be tied

- alone and then used,
  - it may be tied in the bight or at the working end
  - it may be tied one handed
  - it may be fashioned with several loops
  - it may be locked for additional stability
  - it may be tied at high speed in an emergency
- it may be tied through an object (typically a ring).

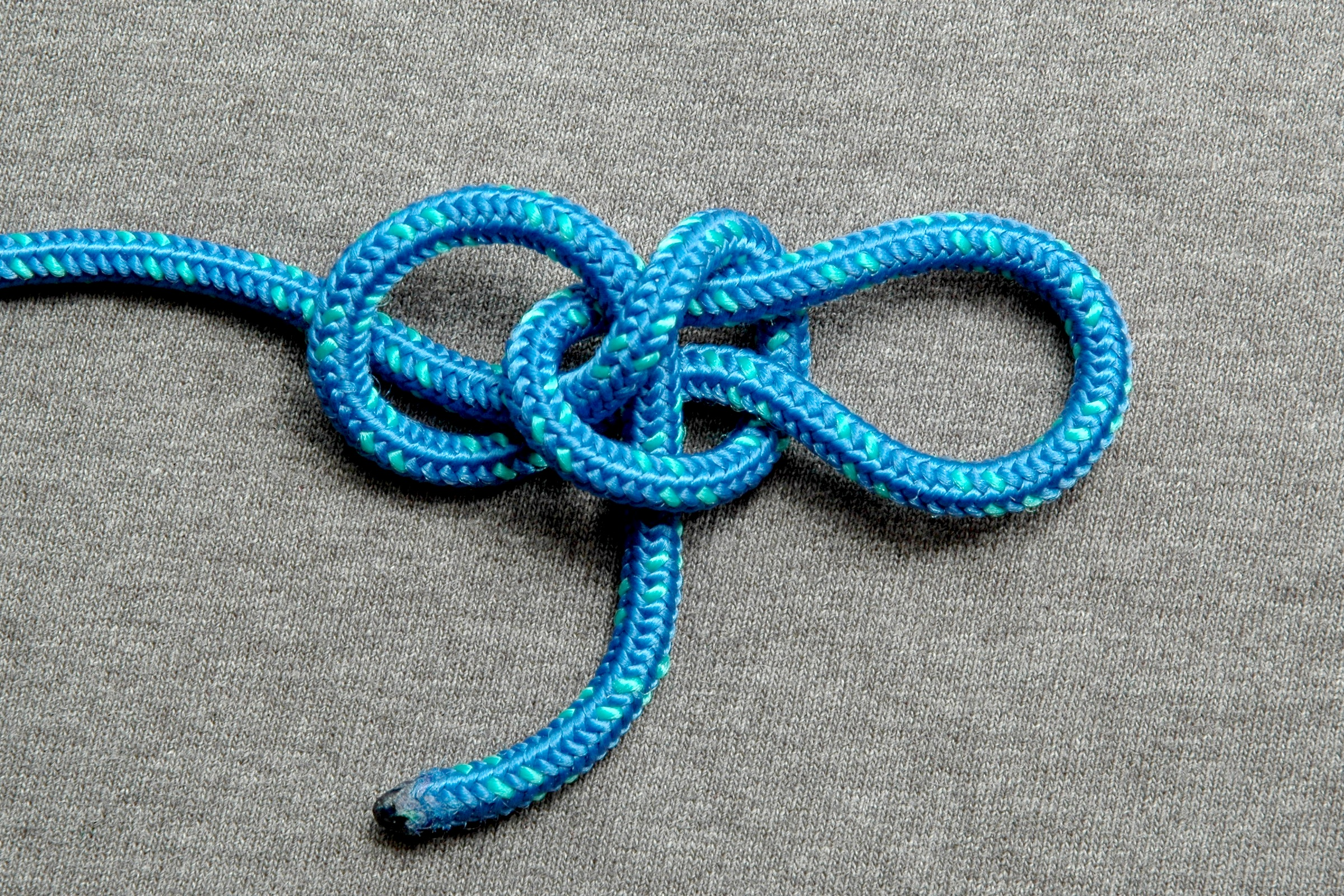
Untightened angler's loop

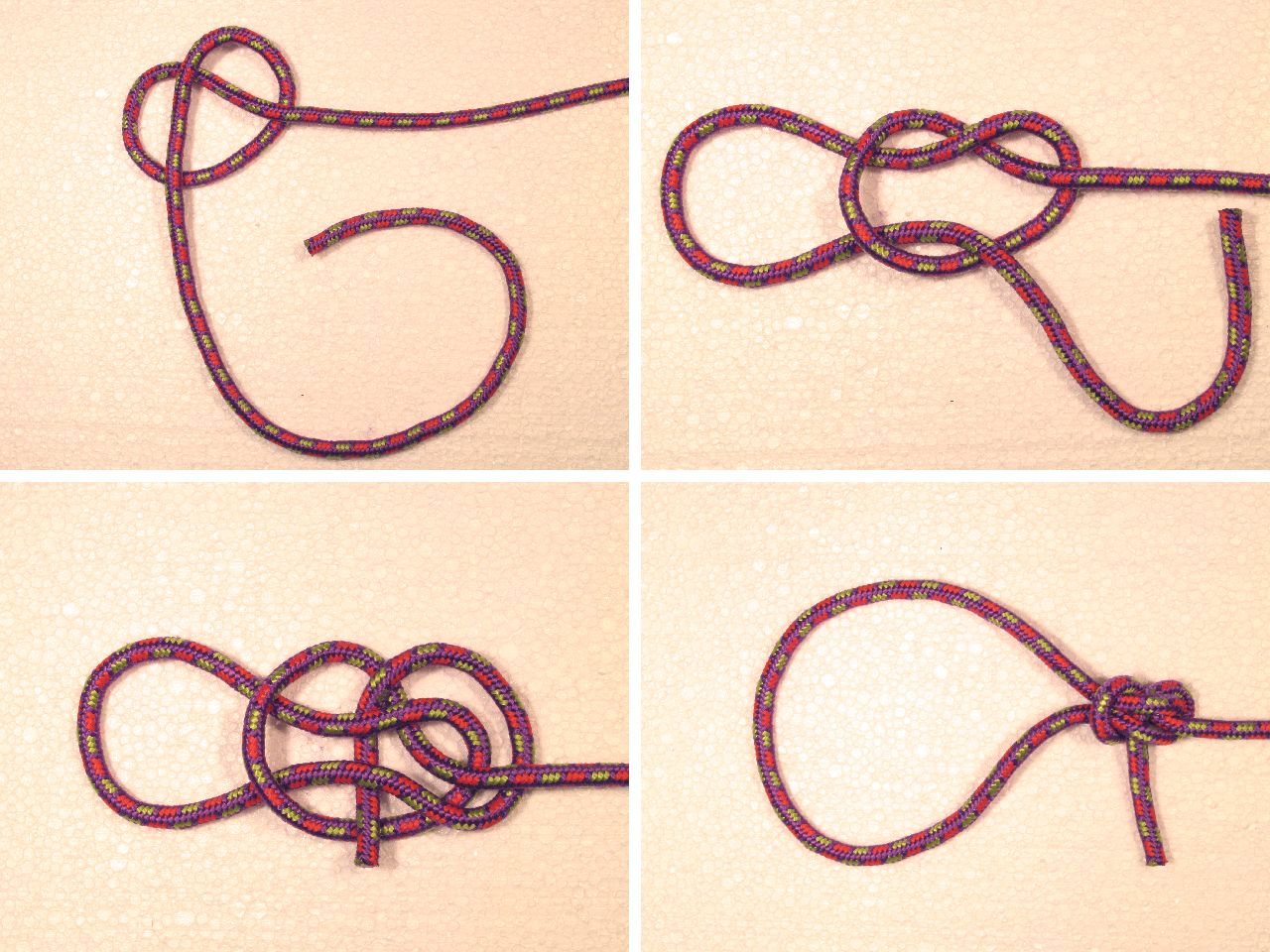
Method of tying the angler's loop through an object

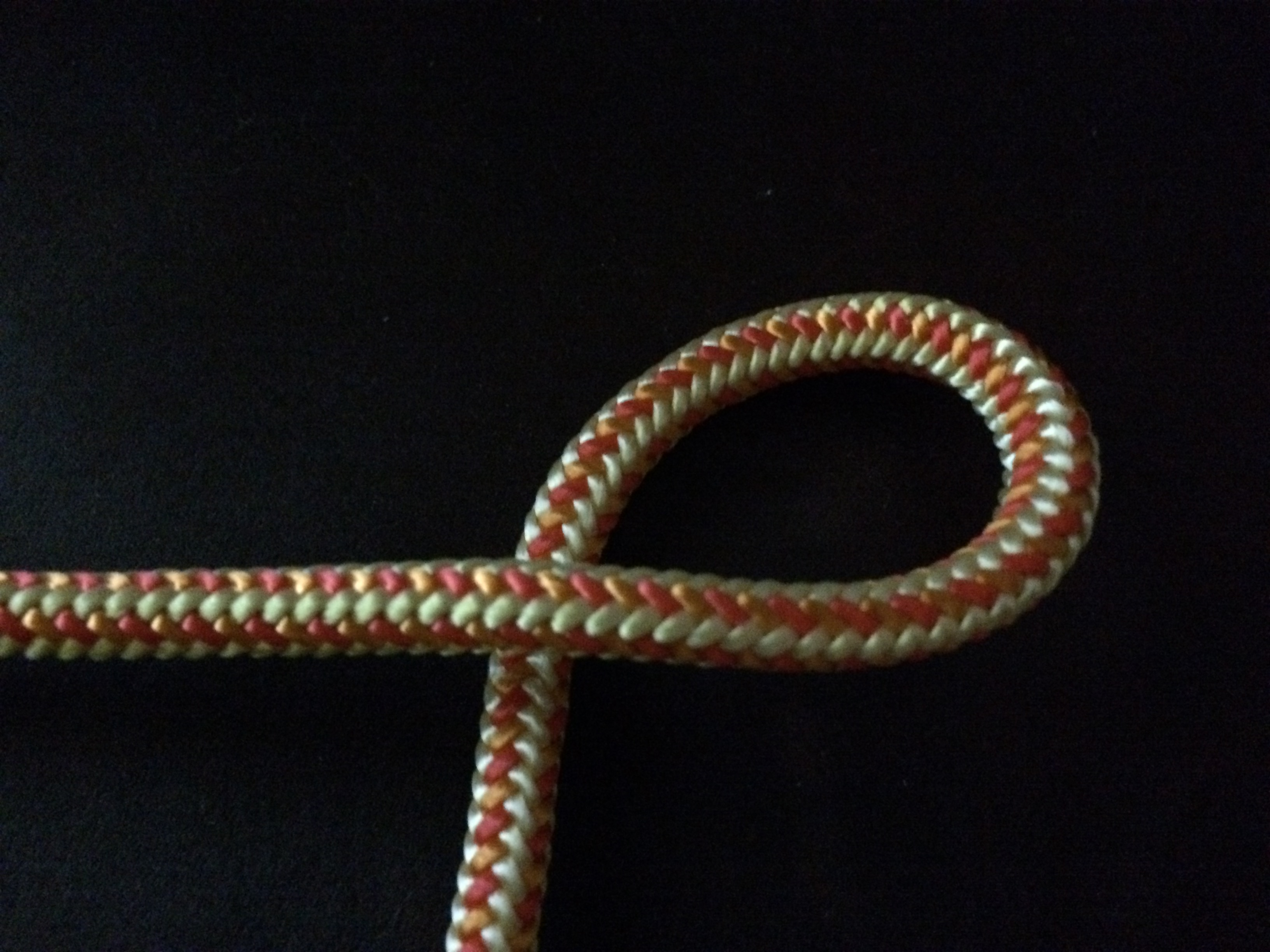
Start with a loop near the working end

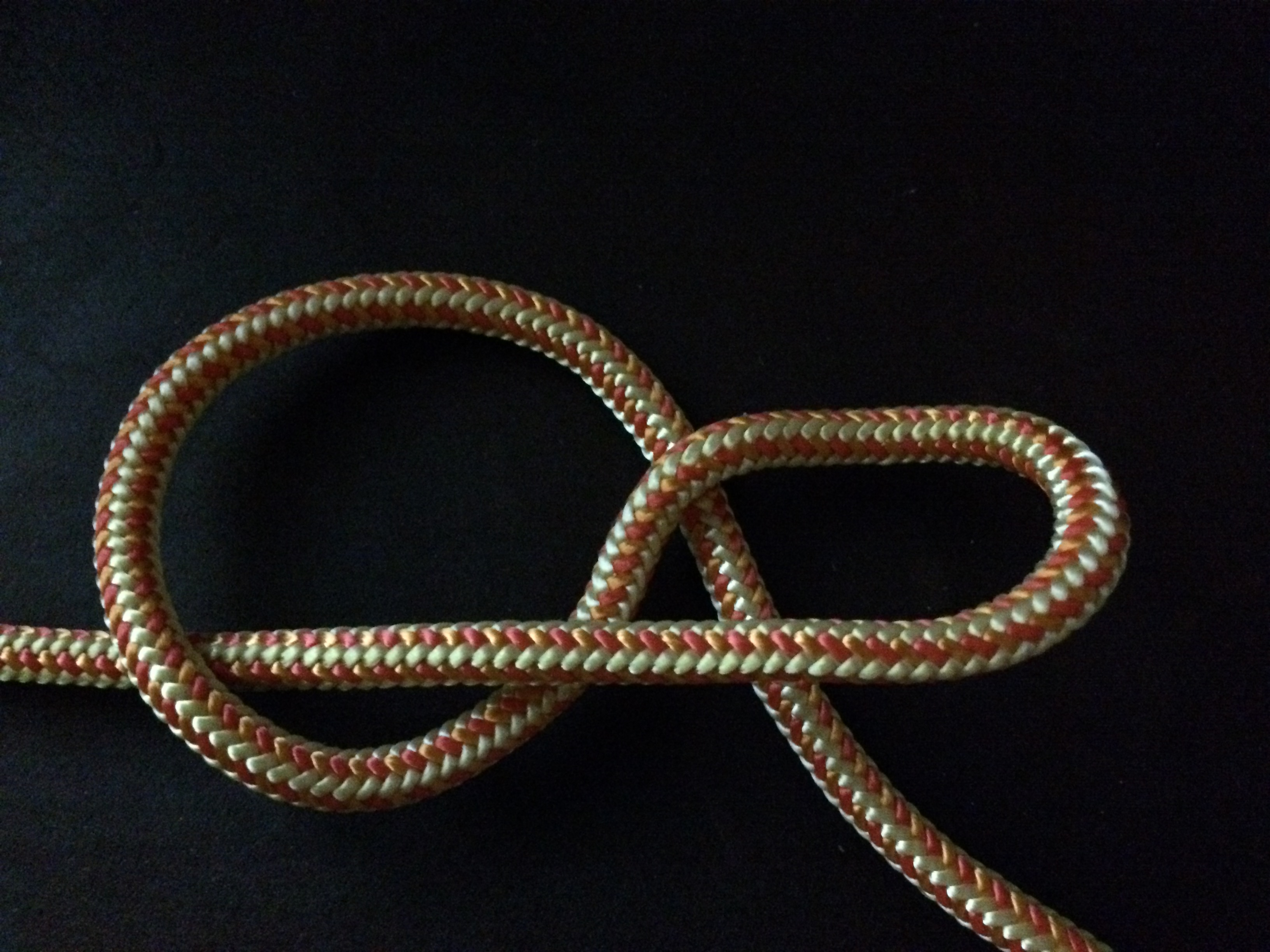
Continue with two loops around standing end

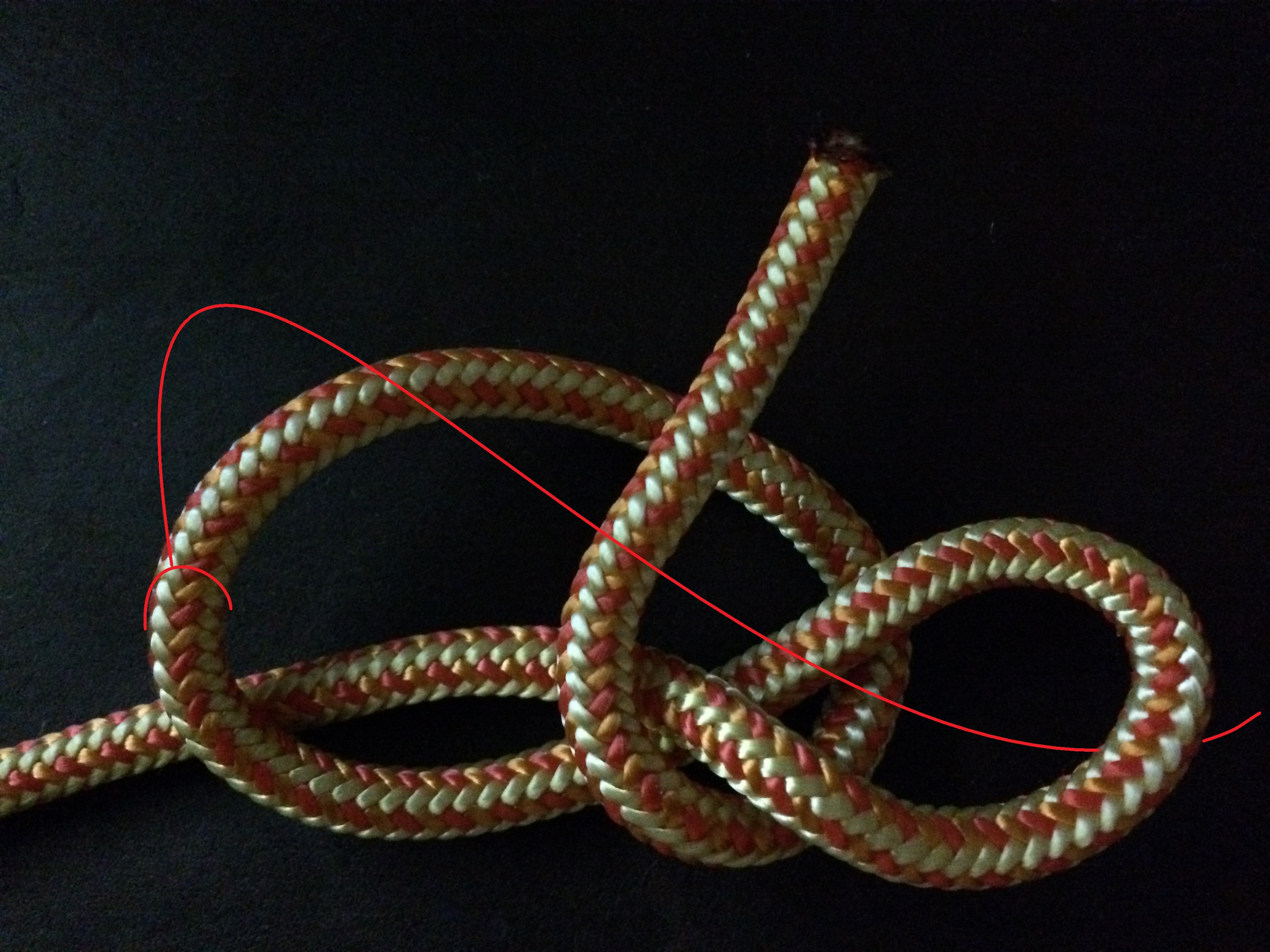
one large and one small in the middle

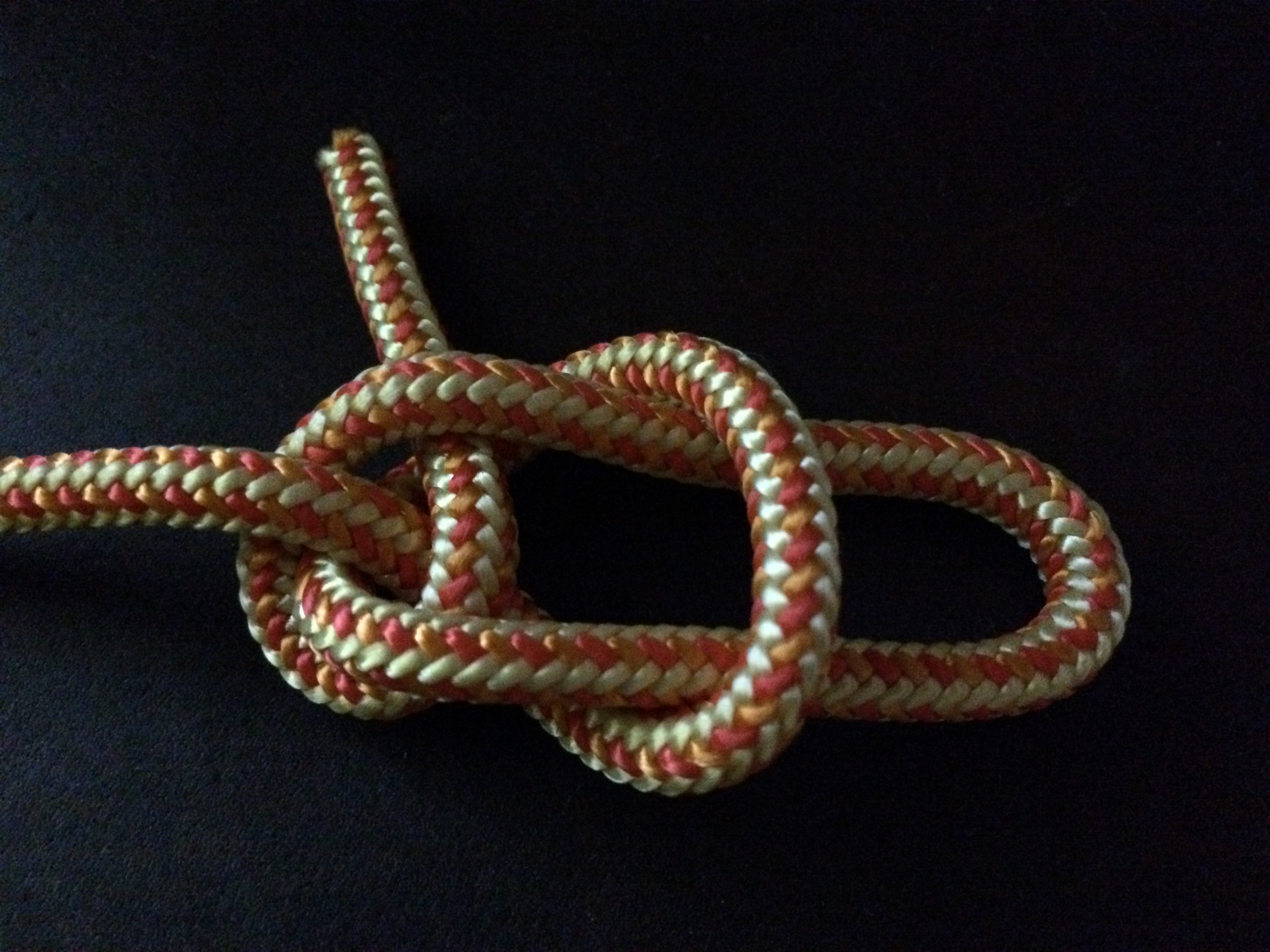
Pull the large loop over the small (working end) and through the first loop

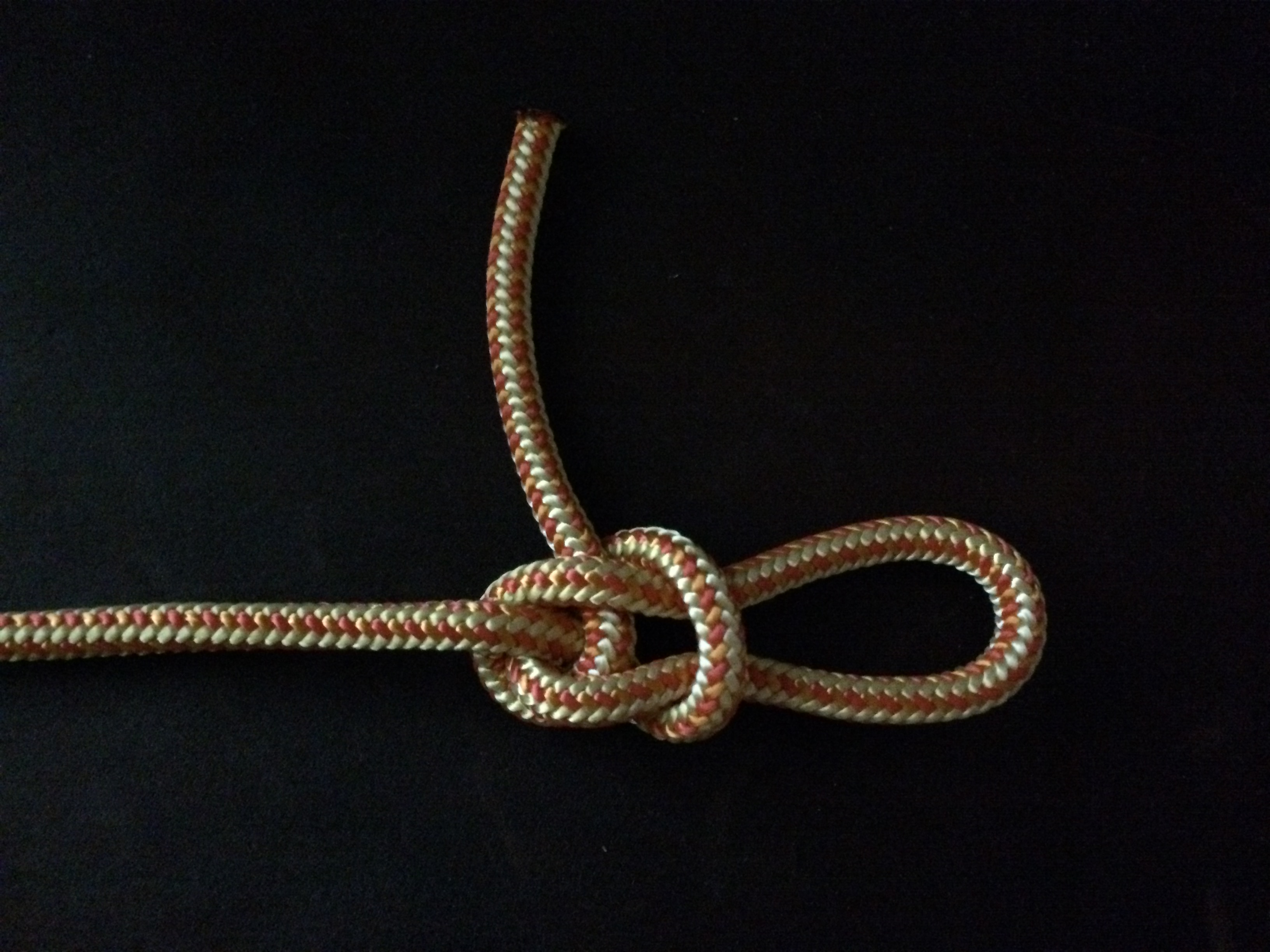
Tighten pulling in all three directions.

Angler's loop may be tied around the hand, it may also be tied this way one handed, or with several loops if need be:

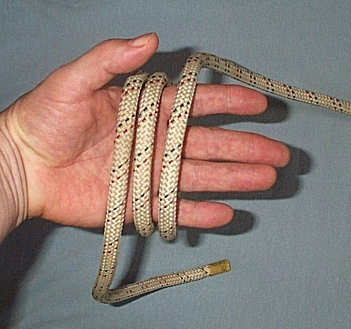
Hold the working end, loop the standing end 3 times around the palm

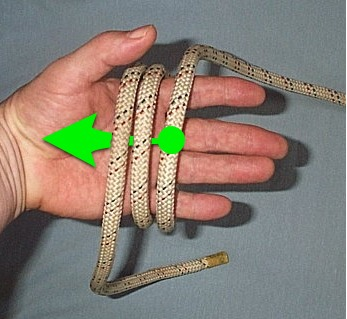
Pull the outmost loop inwards under the first two

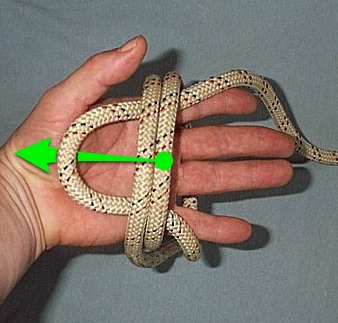
Pull the next outmost over the one(s) in the middle and under the now innermost loop

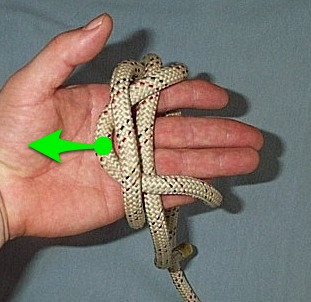
Pull the now innermost loop(s) and the standing end to tighten.

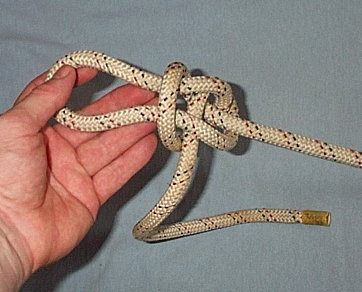
Done.
- Angler's loop may be locked additionally with half hitches

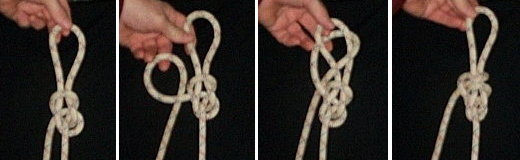
Locked simple loop A half hitch around the loops root locks it

- Angler's loop may be fashioned with several loops (then locking may be necessary)

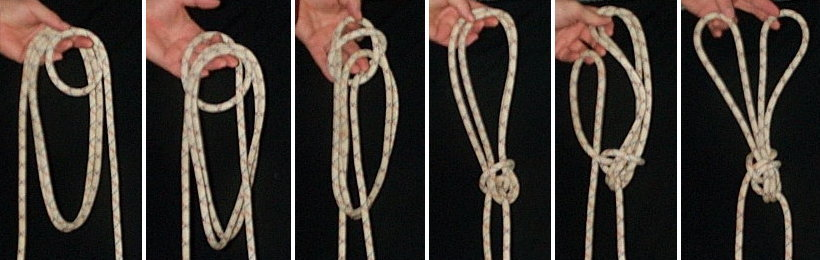
with several loops and locked first the loops in desired size, last loop is for the knot and may be smaller. half hitches around the loops roots locks them.

- A version with an additional locking turn of the tail called Double Dragon is shown in this video:

youtube.com/watch?v=gWhLCM3Hm7U

== Structure ==
Overhand knot on standing part and half-hitch by the working end.

== See also ==
- List of knots
