= Arbor knot =

Fishing knot

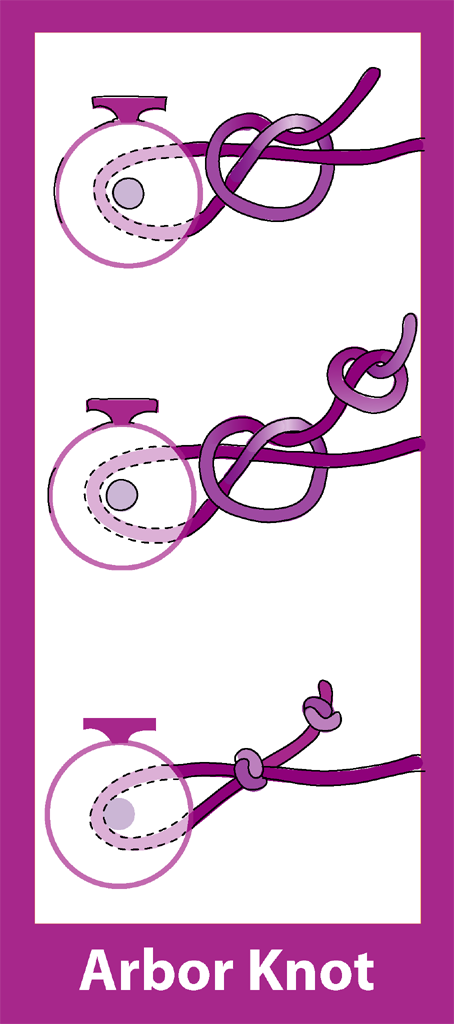
- Names: Arbor knot, Canadian jam knot
- Category: Hitch
- Related: Honda knot, Noose, Slip knot
- Typical use: Fishing
- ABoK: #190, #1114

The Arbor knot is a typical fishers' knot. Its primary use is to attach fishing line to the arbor of a fishing reel.

It has also gained popularity (often under the name "Canadian Jam Knot" or nicknamed "bushcraft zip tie") as a general binding knot to tie down a roll of e.g. a sleeping bag, or to begin a lashing.

== Tying ==
An arbor knot is tied by first passing the line around the reel arbor. The tag end is then tied in an overhand knot around the running line. Finally, an overhand knot is tied in the tag end. When tightened, the overhand knot in the tag end jams against the overhand knot tied around the running line.

== See also ==
- List of knots
