= Hangman's knot =

Type of knot

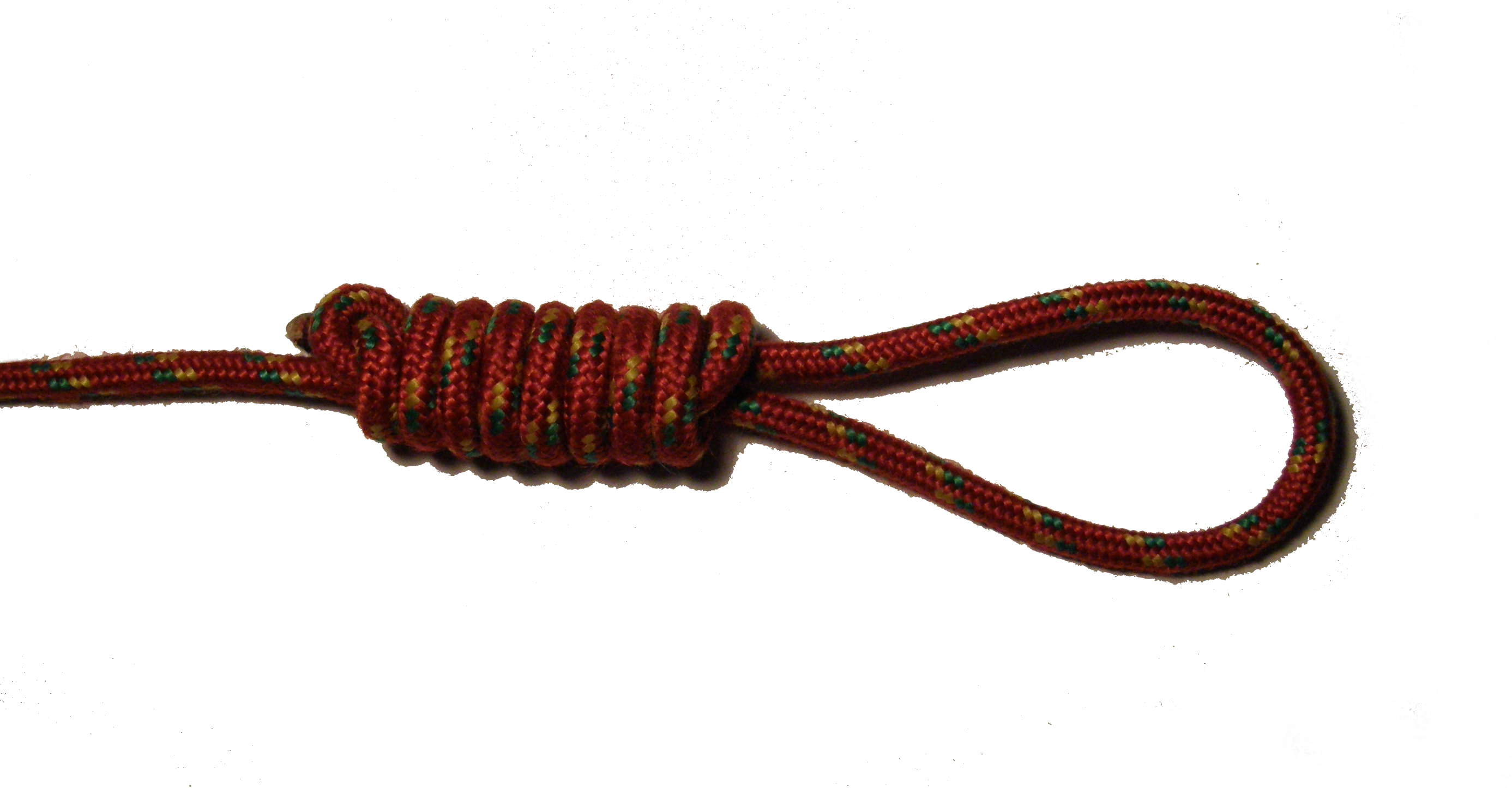
- Names: Hangman's knot, hangman's noose, collar
- Typical use: Hanging
- ABoK: #1119, #366

The hangman's knot or hangman's noose (also known as a collar during the Elizabethan era) is a knot most often associated with its use in hanging a person.

== Function ==
This knot was typically used as a method of capital punishment. The pull on the knot at end of the gallows often resulted in a cervical fracture. Another method intended to result in the mass of the knot crushing closed (occluding) neck arteries, causing cessation of brain circulation, which was not always rapid. The knot is non-jamming but tends to resist attempts to loosen it.

== In culture ==
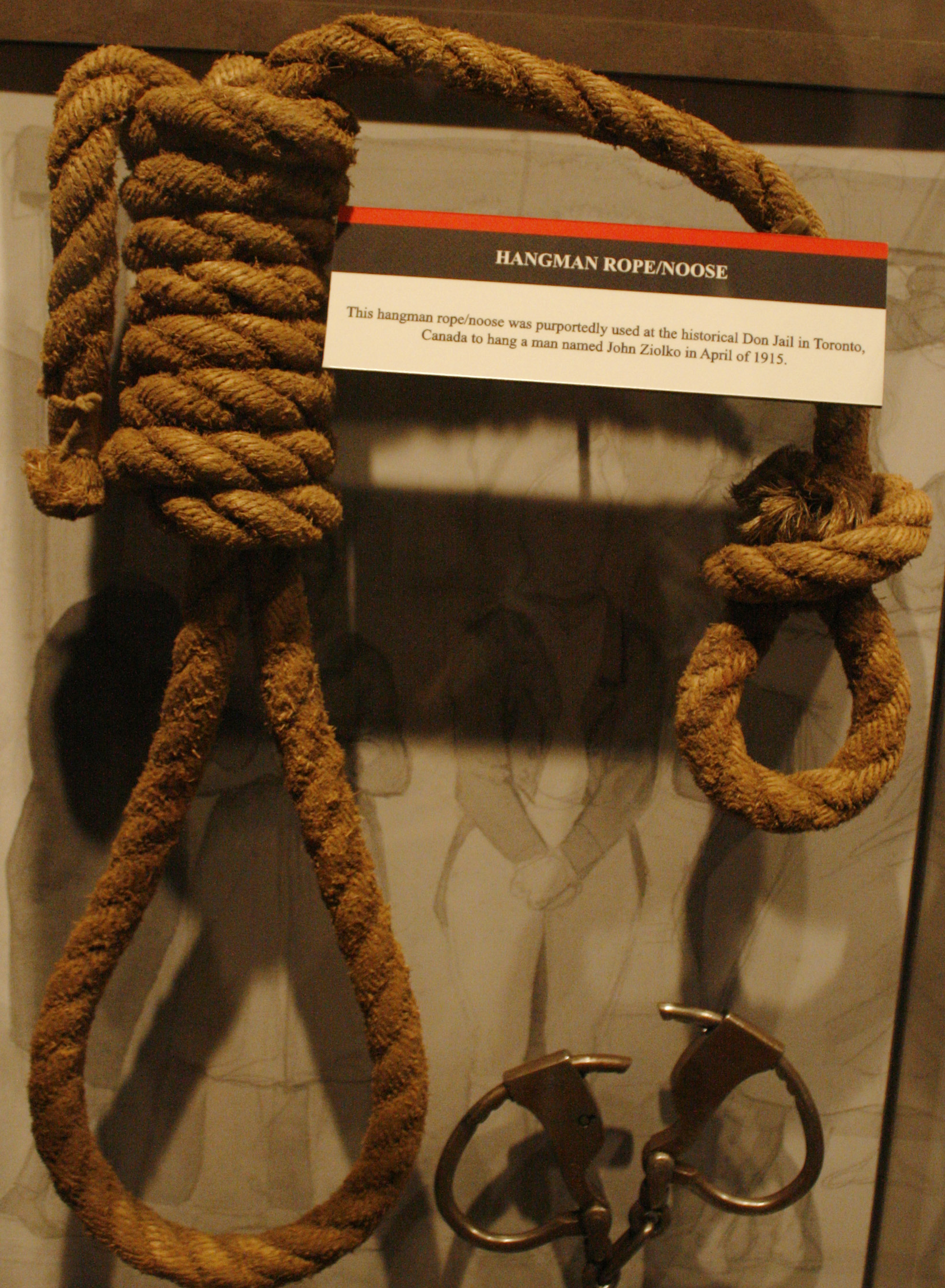
Hangman's rope displayed at the National Museum of Crime & Punishment, Washington, D.C. A label with the title "Hangman Rope/Noose" shown attached to the noose reads, "This hangman rope/noose was purportedly used at the historical Don Jail in Toronto, Canada to hang a man named Jan Ziolko in April of 1915."

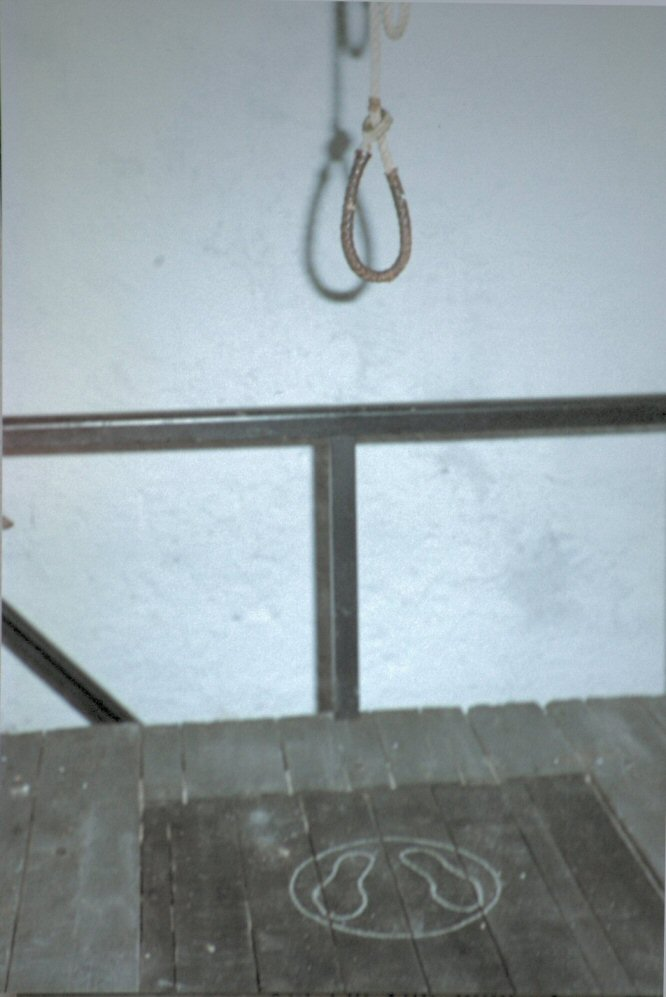
The gallows was in use in the old jail in Jerusalem during the British mandate.

Surviving nooses in the United Kingdom show simple slipknots that were superseded in the late 19th century with a metal eye spliced into one end of the rope, the noose being formed by passing the other end through it. The classic hangman's knot was largely developed in the United States. Filmed hangings of war criminals in Europe after World War II, conducted under US jurisdiction, show such knots placed in various locations.

Each additional coil adds friction to the knot, which makes the noose harder to pull closed or open. When Grover Cleveland was the sheriff of Erie County, he performed two hangings. Cleveland was advised by a more experienced Sheriff to grease the rope with tallow and run it through the knot a few times to ensure rapid closure with the drop. The number of coils should therefore be adjusted depending on the intended use, the type and thickness of rope, and environmental conditions such as wet or greasy rope. One coil makes it equivalent to the simple running knot.

Woody Guthrie sings of the hangman using thirteen coils:

Did you ever see a hangman tie a hangknot?
I've seen it many a time and he winds, he winds,
After thirteen times he's got a hangknot.

== See also ==
- List of knots
