= Noose =

Rope loop and knot

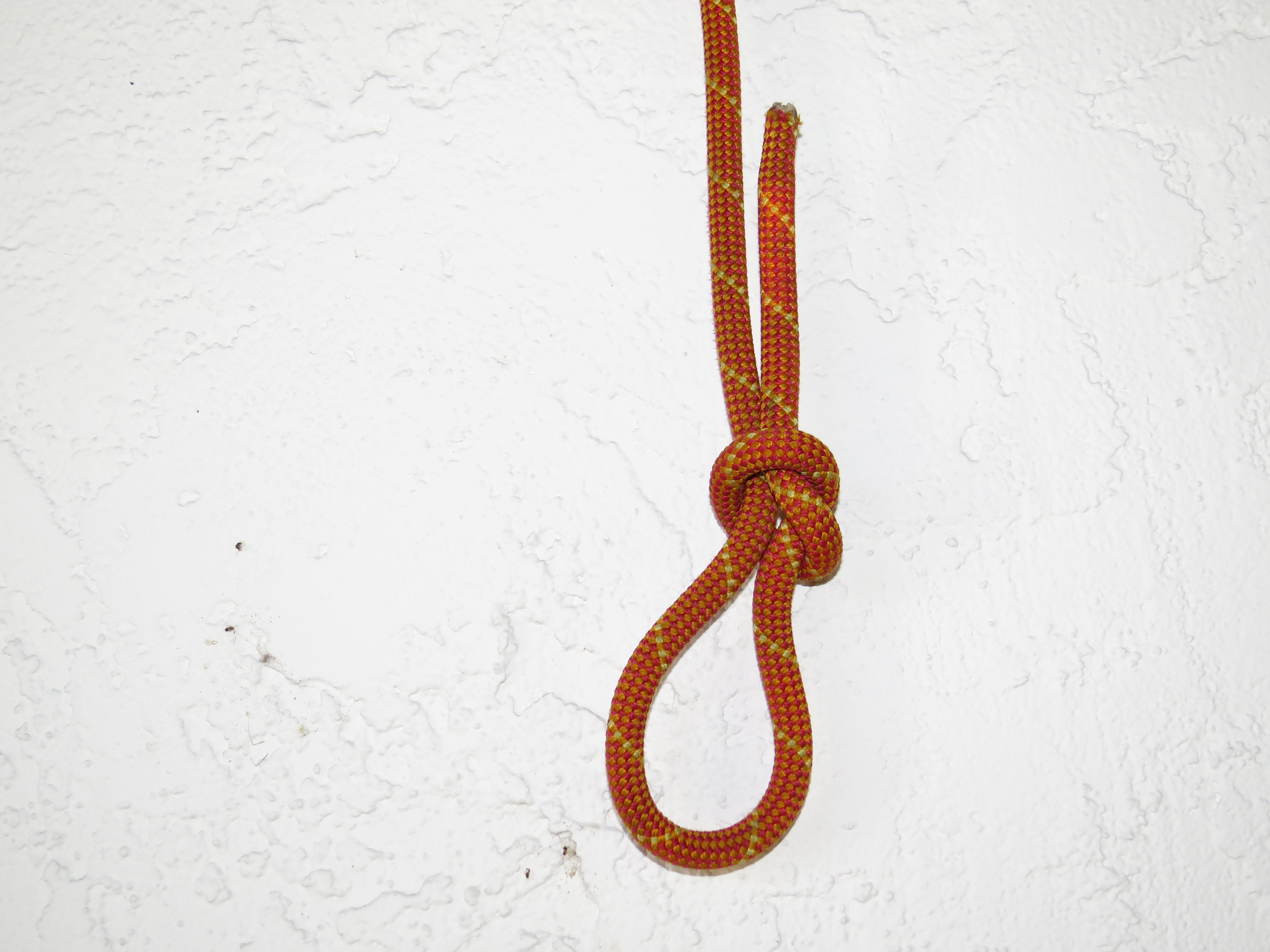
- A noose knot tied in kernmantle rope
- Names: Noose, running knot
- Category: Loop
- Related: Slip knot, overhand knot, double overhand noose, hangman's knot, running bowline, arbor knot
- Releasing: Non-jamming
- Typical use: Animal snares, knitting, hanging device, self tightening end loop
- ABoK: #8, #43, #1114, #1789, #1803, #1825
- Instructions

A noose is a loop at the end of a rope in which the knot tightens under load and can be loosened without untying the knot. The knot can be used to secure a rope to a post, pole, or animal but only where the end is in a position that the loop can be passed over.

== Tying ==
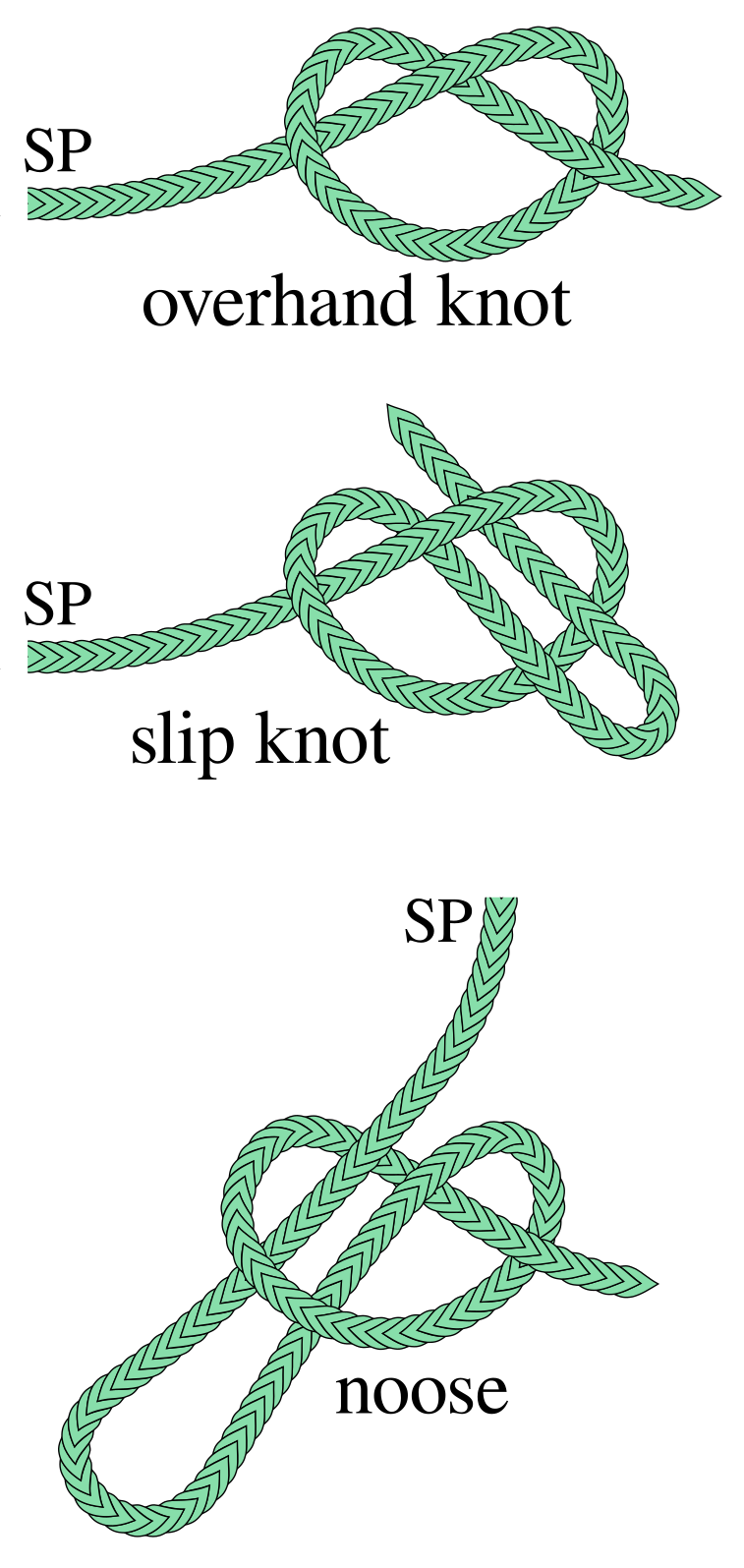
The noose knot is a slipped version of the overhand knot

The knot is tied by forming a turn in the end of a rope, and then passing a bight in the standing part through. The noose knot is a slipped version of the overhand knot.

== Use in hanging ==
The knot most closely associated with execution is the hangman's knot, which is also known as the "hangman's noose". Tying is similar to the original noose, but many turns are wrapped around the loop. The reason for this was to make the hanging more humane, as it would break the person's neck, killing the person instantly, rather than strangling them to death. A similar method is also commonly used for suicide.

== Use in intimidation and hate-based racial politics ==
In the United States, a noose is sometimes left as a message in order to intimidate people, as it was the main object used in segregation era lynchings. In 2022, a bill to make lynching a federal hate crime was passed. It is illegal to display a noose in a threatening manner in Virginia, New York and Connecticut.

Austin Reed Edenfield, a former student of the University of Mississippi, pled guilty in 2016 to a federal civil-rights crime, acknowledging that he and Graeme Phillip Harris had tied a noose and a flag of Georgia around the neck of a statue honoring James Meredith, the university's first African-American student. Harris was sentenced to prison and Edenfield to probation and community service.

In September 2019, Andrew M. Smith, a University of Illinois student, was arrested for placing a noose in a campus elevator. "The incident [came] just months after black employees filed a class-action lawsuit against the campus, alleging they faced racial harassment and were exposed to threats of racial violence, such as nooses, swastikas, KKK garb, racist graffiti, and confederate flags." He was sentenced to supervision, public service, and a $75 fine.

In November 2022, a noose was found on an Obama Presidential Center construction site.

In July 2025, a noose was found during construction at the New Nissan Stadium.

In December 2025, Israel's national security and far-right minister of Otzma Yehudit, Itamar Ben-Gvir and his party colleagues were criticised for wearing golden noose-shaped pins on their lapels when supporting the death penalty for Palestinian prisoners.

=== Bubba Wallace incident ===
In July 2020 a garage assigned to African-American NASCAR driver Bubba Wallace had been found to contain a "garage door pull rope fashioned like a noose". After the discovery, which was made by a crew member for Richard Petty Motorsports at the Alabama racetrack, NASCAR was alerted and contacted the FBI, which sent 15 agents to the track to investigate. After the FBI investigation the authorities said the rope had been hanging there since last fall and thus was not a hate crime targeting Wallace. The agencies said no crime was committed and the evidence did not support federal charges. The actions of NASCAR, especially NASCAR president Steve Phelps's claim of it being a hate crime without investigation have been criticized. Holman W. Jenkins Jr. on The Wall Street Journal claimed the controversy and media furor concerning the incident could have been prevented by not contacting the FBI and NASCAR authorities quickly checking the video surveillance by themselves, since NASCAR already tightly controls and surveils access to its garages.

== See also ==
- List of knots
