= Shoelace knot =

Type of knot

- Names: Shoelace knot, Bow
- Category: Binding
- Category 2: Loop
- Related: Reef knot
- Releasing: Non-jamming
- Typical use: Tying shoelaces, bow ties, decorative bows
- ABoK: #1212, #2403, #2404, #2411

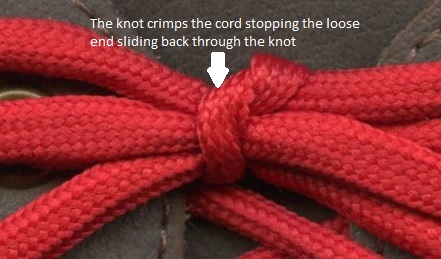
Close-up of a shoelace knot.

The shoelace knot, or bow knot, is commonly used for tying shoelaces and bow ties.

The shoelace knot is a doubly slipped reef knot formed by joining the ends of whatever is being tied with a half hitch, folding each of the exposed ends into a loop (bight) and joining the loops with a second half hitch. The size of the loops and the length of the exposed ends are adjusted when the knot is tied. It has the stability of the reef knot but is significantly easier to untie, simply by pulling the ends away from the center of the knot.

The loops are sometimes referred to as "bunny ears", especially when the knot is taught to children.

== Techniques ==
There are several ways to tie a shoelace knot; each starts with the tying of a half hitch, and requires attention or some habitual mechanism for arriving at a knot that is an elaboration of the reef (or square) knot rather than of the granny (or lubber's) knot. If the bow is horizontal across the opening the bow is correctly and securely tied, but if vertical is likely to slip. One approach is to start by taking, in each hand, the end of the lace that emerges from the uppermost eyelet on that hand's side of the shoe; then passing the dominant hand's end under the other end, from front toward back, and dropping each lace on the opposite side from where it started; and in the finishing step again grasping the lace on each side with the hand on that side (perhaps taking time to note that because each end crossed over the shoe before, the laces have switched hands – or vice versa, the hands have switched laces) and again passing the dominant hand's end under the other end, from front toward back.

- The simplest approach to describe is to also form a loop by bending each lace end back toward the closest part of the same lace, then join the two loops in another half hitch, in the second passing-back-under described before these bullet points.
- Another common procedure (especially for bow ties) is to form a loop at one of the ends of the initial half-hitch, and circle it with the other end, which is simultaneously folded into a second loop that is then pushed through the knot.
- The quickest approach is said to be one involving making one loop between the thumb and forefinger of each hand, and pulling each loop through the other; speed probably requires acquisition of muscle memory via repetition that is guided by a sequence of images.

=== More secure shoe-tying knots ===
A variation of the procedure involves looping the top part of the knot twice instead of once, resulting in a finished bow of almost identical appearance but with the laces wrapped twice around the middle. This Double Slip Knot holds the shoelaces more securely tied while still allowing them to be untied with a (slightly firmer) pull on the loose end(s). One variation, the subject of a U.S. patent, begins with a surgeon knot and has an upper double slip knot on top of that. Lace locking can be added for additional security.

=== A less secure shoe-tying knot ===
Tying two consecutive right-over-left half knots (or two consecutive left-over-right half knots) produces, instead of a square-knot-like bow-knot, a much less secure version corresponding to the granny knot. This version will also produce asymmetrical slips; one pointing down, the other up.

=== The corset bow ===
Just as it is possible to stack a number of half hitches to create a longer knot – remembering the reverse direction each time – which is equivalent to tying one reef knot on top of another, so bows which need to reduce long lengths, such as corset tapes, can be tied on top of each other, slipping every other layer.

Sketch showing a Double Slip Knot tied incorrectly by basing it on the granny knot instead of the reef knot
