= Overhand knot =

Type of knot

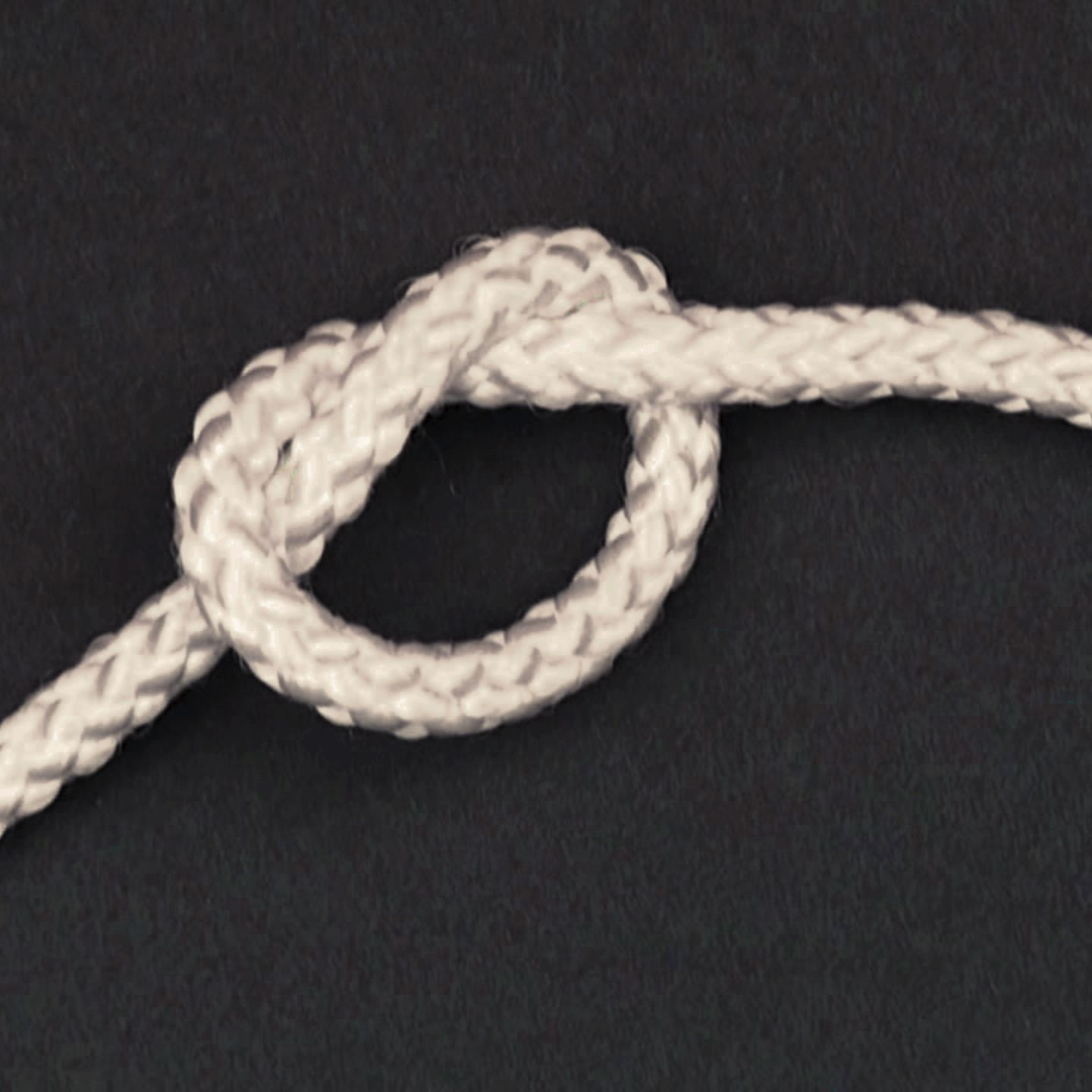
- The overhand knot
- Names: Overhand knot, thumb knot
- Category: Stopper
- Efficiency: 50%
- Origin: Ancient
- Related: Simple noose, overhand loop, figure-eight knot, angler's loop, reef knot, fisherman's knot, water knot, half hitch
- Releasing: Jamming
- Typical use: fishing, climbing, shoelaces, making other knots.
- Caveat: Spills if the standing part is pulled forcibly in the wrong direction
- ABoK: #4, #46, #514, #515, #519
- Conway Notation: 3
- A/B notation: 3_{1}

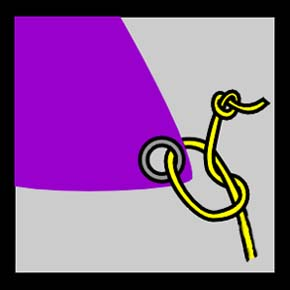
The use of a half hitch and an overhand knot, the last used as a stopper.

The overhand knot is one of the most fundamental knots, and it forms the basis of many others, including the simple noose, overhand loop, angler's loop, reef knot, fisherman's knot, half hitch, and water knot. The overhand knot is a stopper, especially when used alone, and hence it is very secure, to the point of jamming badly. It should be used if the knot is intended to be permanent. It is often used to prevent the end of a rope from unraveling. An overhand knot becomes a trefoil knot, a true knot in the mathematical sense, by joining the ends. It can also be adjusted, faired, or mis-tied as a half hitch.

46. The overhand is the simplest of the single-strand stopper knots, and is tied with one end around its own standing part, its purpose being to prevent unreeving.
47. The half knot is a binding knot, being the first movement of the reef or square knot. It is tied with two ends around an object and is used when reefing, furling, and tying up parcels, shoestrings, and the like.
48. The half hitch is tied with one end of a rope which is passed around an object and secured to its own standing part with a single hitch.

— The Ashley Book of Knots

== Tying ==
Tying an overhand knot

There are a number of ways to tie the Overhand knot.

- Thumb method – create a loop and push the working end through the loop with your thumb.
- Overhand method – create a bight, by twisting the hand over at the wrist and sticking your hand in the hole, pinch the working end with your fingers and pull through the loop.

== Heraldry ==
Stafford knot of heraldry

In heraldry, the overhand knot is known as a "Stafford knot", owing to a representation of it being used first as a heraldic badge by the Earls of Stafford, and later as a general symbol of Staffordshire.

== In nature ==
As a defensive measure, hagfishes, which resemble eels, produce large volumes of thick slime when disturbed. A hagfish can dislodge large quantities of slime on its skin, which it uses to evade predation, by tying its own body into an overhand knot, then sliding the knot from its head down to the tail. This action scrapes the slime off the fish's body. Hagfish also tie their bodies into overhand knots in order to create leverage to rip off chunks of their prey's flesh, but do so "in reverse" (starting at the tail, and sliding the knot towards the head for mechanical advantage).

== Knot theory ==
If the two loose ends of an overhand knot are joined together (without creating additional crossings), this becomes equivalent to the trefoil knot of mathematical knot theory.

== In paper-folding ==
Pentagonal overhand knot tied in flat material

If a flat ribbon or strip is tightly folded into a flattened overhand knot, it assumes a regular pentagonal shape.

== See also ==
- List of knots
- Trefoil knot, the mathematical treatment of the overhand knot
- Double overhand knot
- Slip knot
