= Overhand loop =

Type of knot

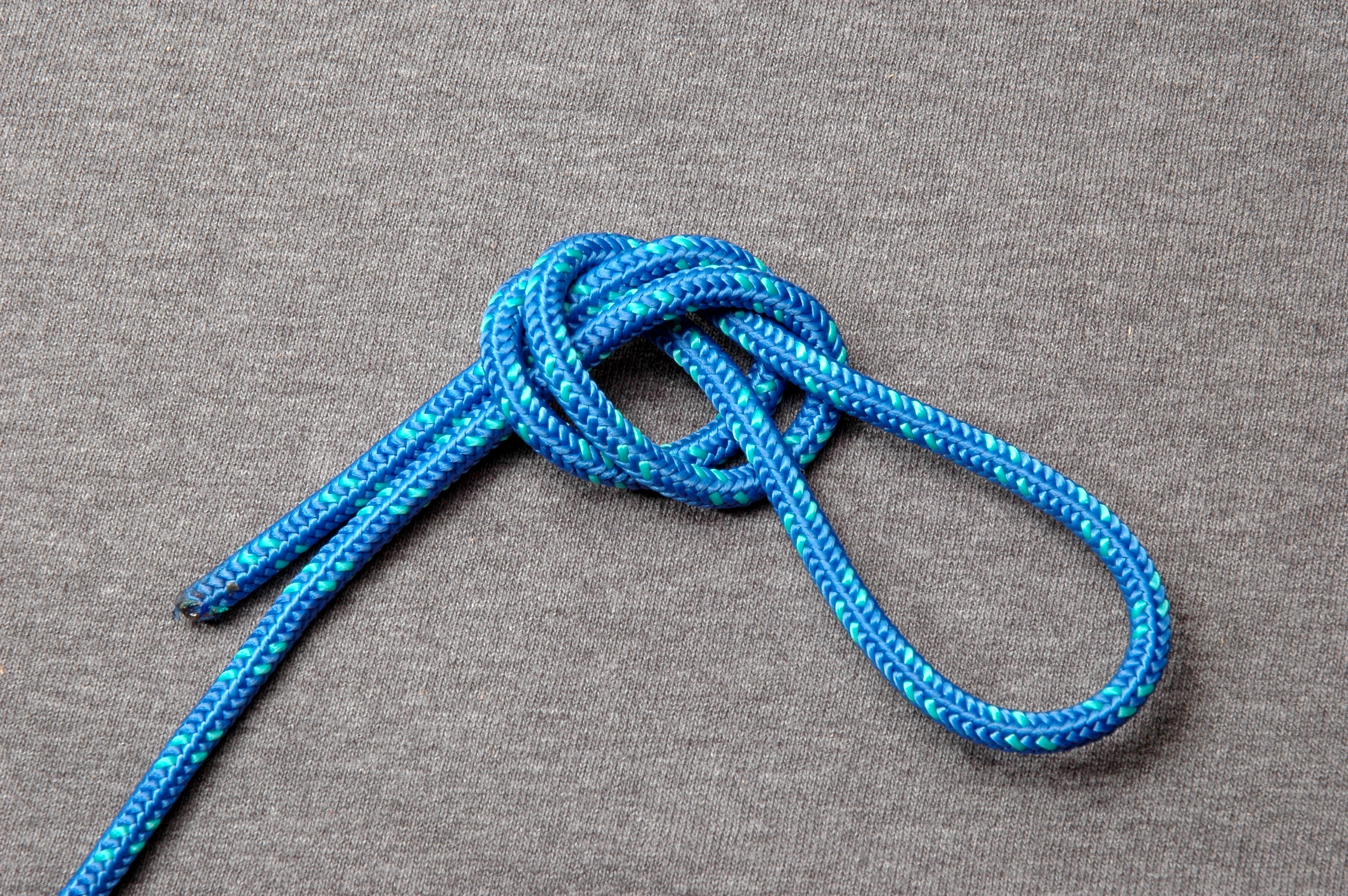
- Names: Overhand loop, Loop knot
- Category: Loop
- Origin: Ancient
- Releasing: Jamming
- ABoK: #1009, #1046, #518

The overhand loop is a simple knot which forms a fixed loop in a rope. Made by tying an overhand knot in the bight, it can be tied anywhere along a rope (does not need any working end). The knot can be used for attaching clips, hooks, other rope, etc., but has the disadvantage that it is likely to jam tight when the rope has been pulled and the knot may need to be cut off. It also has some uses in kite-flying, though other knots may be better. It is commonly disapproved by cadets because of its tendency to be misused as an alternative to the bowline. (Reference 1 also contains a sequence of images that show how to tie an overhand knot.)
