= Slip knot =

Type of knot

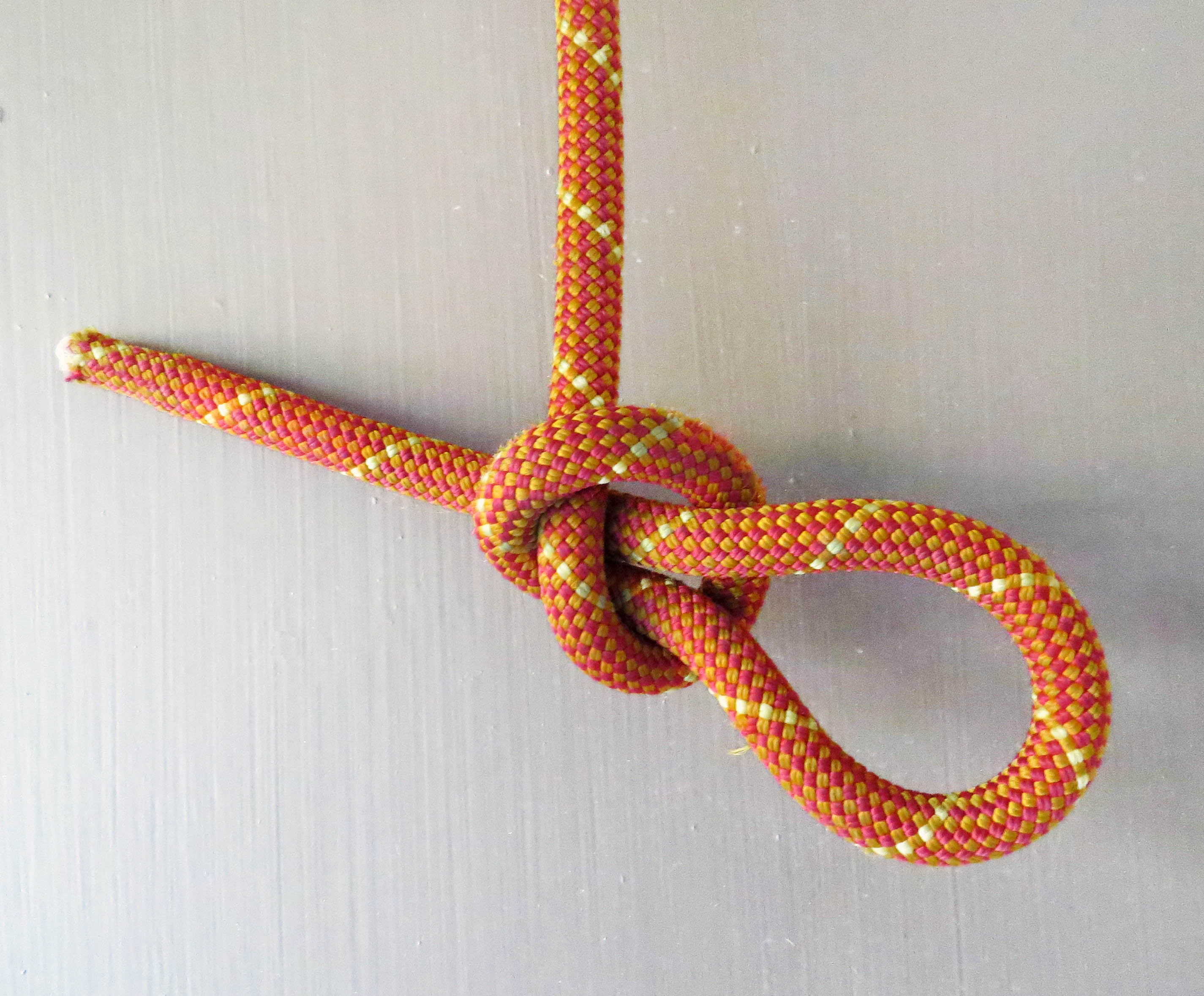
- A slip knot tied in a kernmantle rope
- Names: Slip knot, Slipped overhand knot
- Category: Stopper
- Related: overhand knot, noose knot, running knot
- Releasing: Non-jamming
- Typical use: temporary stopper knot, knitting, animal snares
- ABoK: 529

The slip knot is a stopper knot which is easily undone by pulling the tail (working end). The slip knot is related to the running knot, which will release when the standing end is pulled. Both knots are identical and are composed of a slipped overhand knot, where a bight allows the knot to be released by pulling on an end; the working end for a slip knot, and the standing end for a running knot. The slip knot is used as a starting point for crochet and knitting.

The slip knot is a stopper knot that may be spilled or slipped instantly by pulling on the end to withdraw a loop. There is but one knot entitled to the name; any others having a similar feature are merely "slipped" knots. -- The Ashley Book of Knots

== Standard creation ==
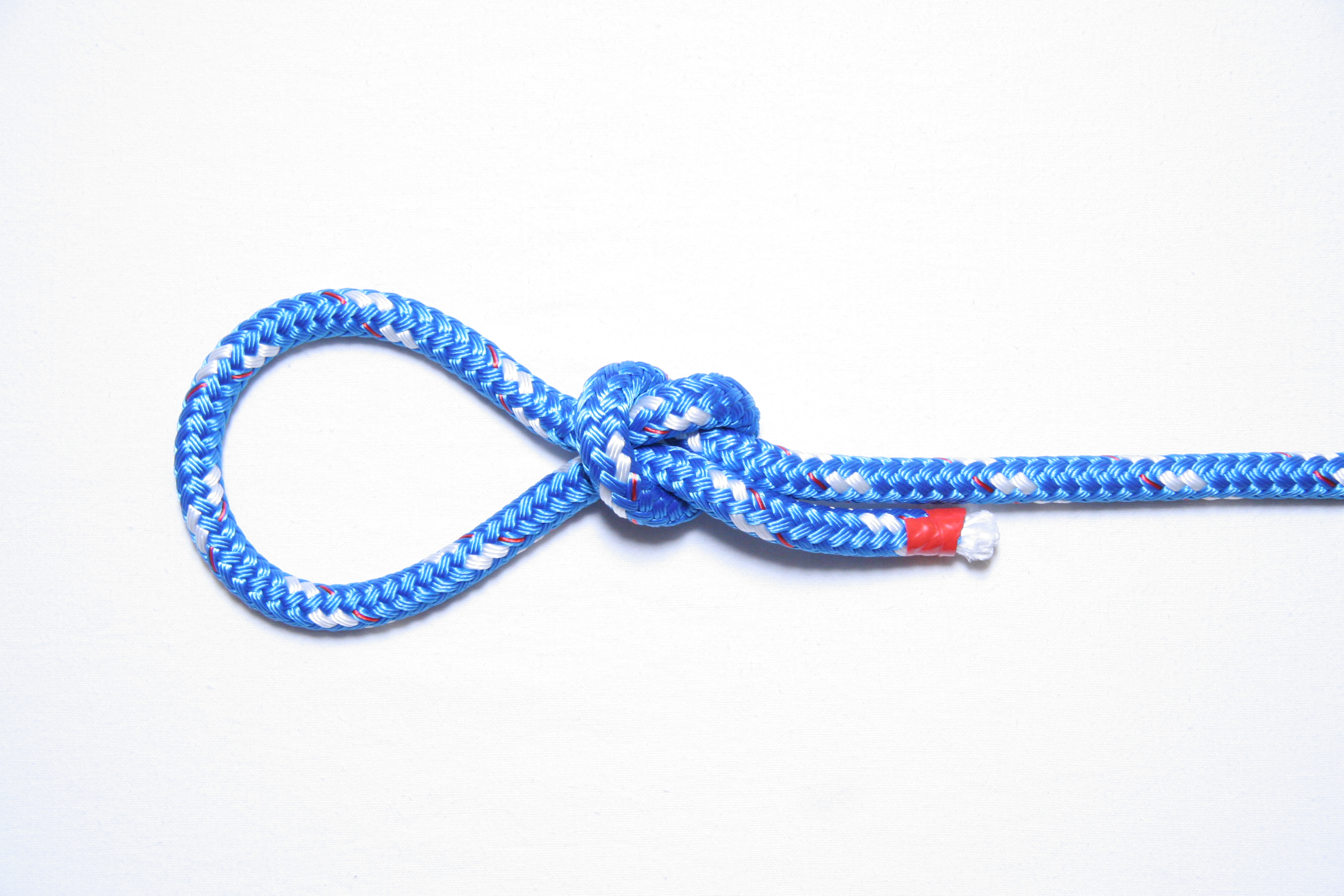
Slip knot

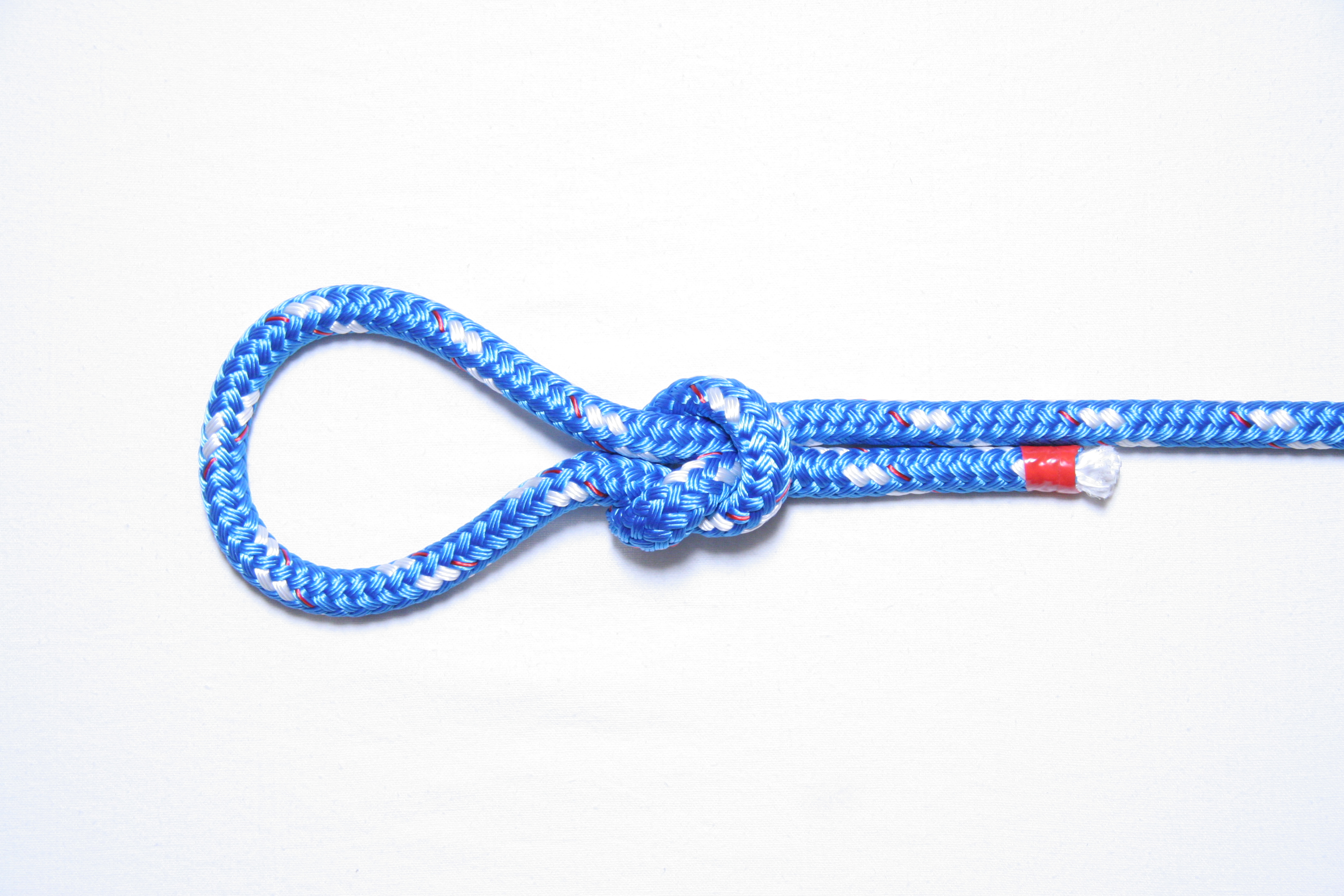
Noose

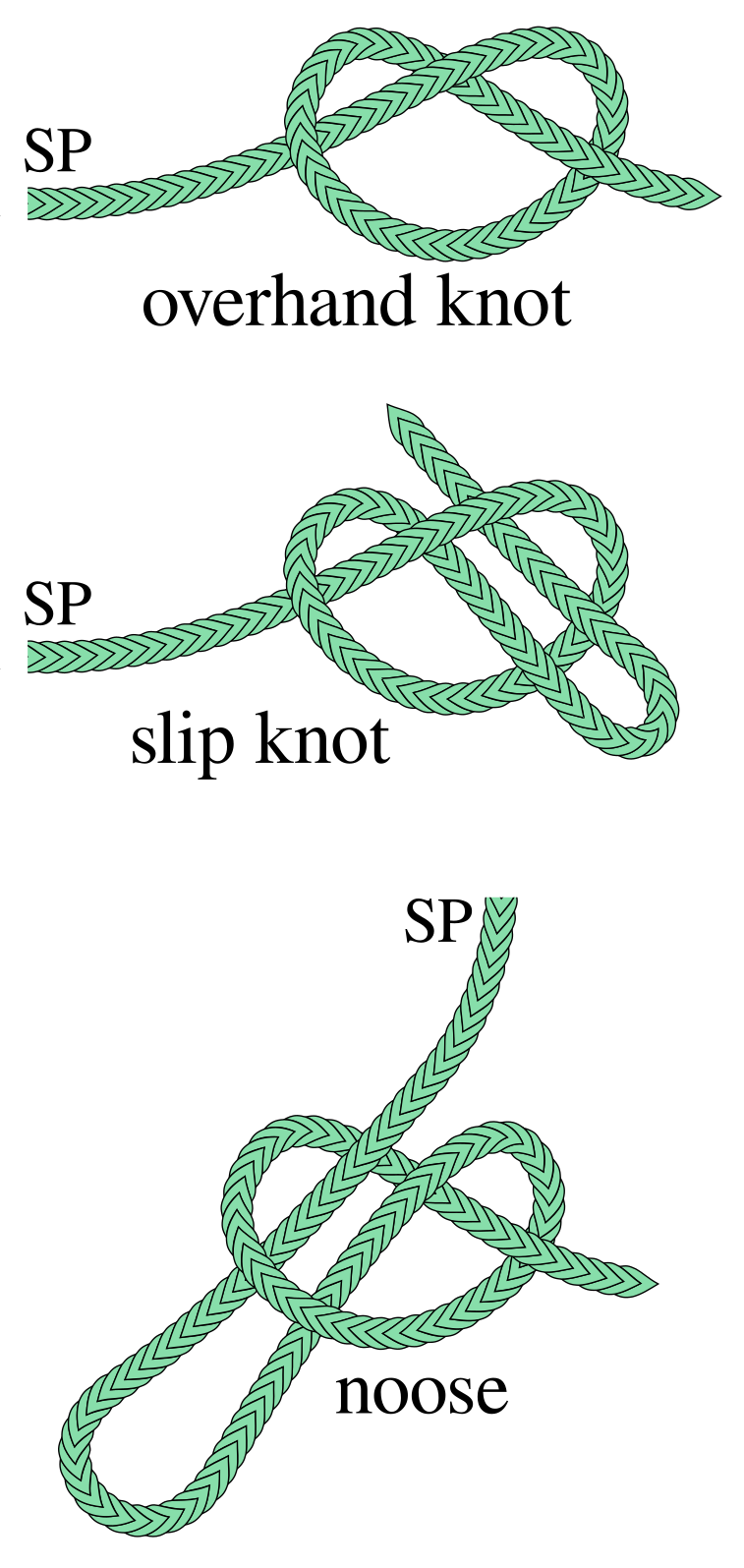
overhand knot, slip knot, noose

The slip knot is closely related to the overhand knot, the difference between the two being in the treatment of the end. In the former the end is doubled before it is finally tucked. To untie, all that is required is a smart pull on the end of the rope, which withdraws the loop and causes the knot to spill instantly. A slip knot may be tied in the bight as readily as in the end, but the load must be on the standing part of the knot only. It is used wherever the necessity to cast off suddenly may arise.

— The Ashley Book of Knots

The slip knot is formed by first creating a loop in the shape of a "p". Place a hand or hook through the loophole and grab a bight on the working end. Draw this bight through the first loop. Seat the knot and pull the bight until a small loop is created.

== See also ==
- Knot
- List of knots
