= Bight (knot) =

Curved section between two ends of a rope

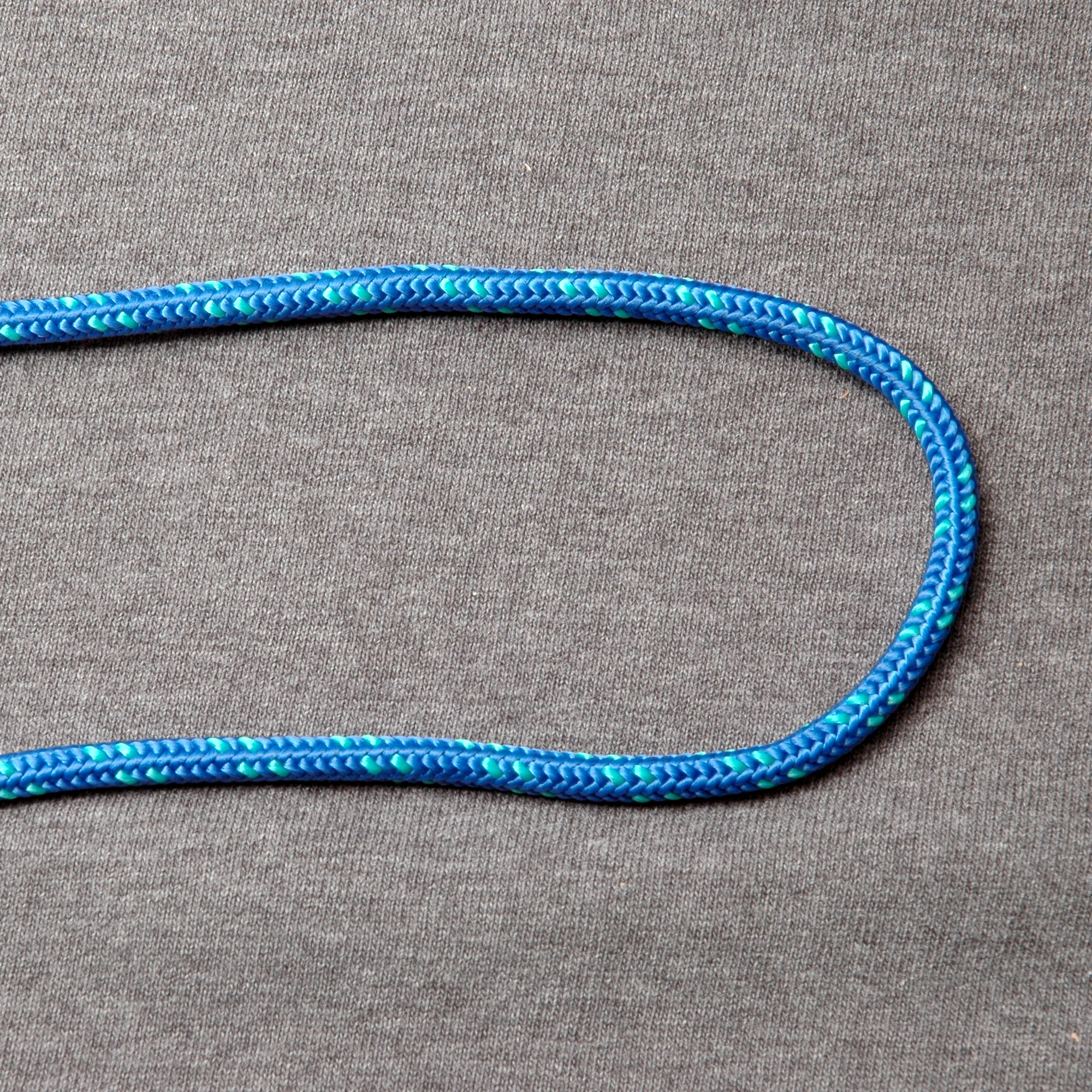
An open loop of rope. Sources differ on whether this is a bight.

In knot tying, a bight is a curved section or slack part between the two ends of a rope, string, or yarn. A knot that can be tied using only the bight of a rope, without access to the ends, is described as in the bight. The term "bight" is also used in a more specific way when describing Turk's head knots, indicating how many repetitions of braiding are made in the circuit of a given knot.

== Bight vs. open loop ==
Sources differ on whether an open loop or U-shaped curve in a rope qualifies as a bight. Ashley (1944) treats bights and loops as distinct, stating that a curve "no narrower than a semicircle" is a bight, while an open loop is a curve "narrower than a bight but with separated ends". However, The Illustrated Encyclopedia of Knots (2002) states: "Any section of line that is bent into a U-shape is a bight."

== Slipped knot ==
In order to make a slipped knot (also slipped loop and quick release knot), a bight must be passed, rather than the end. This slipped form of the knot is more easily untied. The traditional bow knot used for tying shoelaces is simply a reef knot with the final overhand knot made with two bights instead of the ends. Similarly, a slippery hitch is a slipped variation of the single hitch that spills instantly when the end of the rope is pulled.

== In the bight ==
The phrase in the bight (or on a bight) means a bight of line is itself being used to make a knot. Specifically this means that the knot can be formed without access to the ends of the rope. This can be an important property for knots to be used in situations where the ends of the rope are inaccessible, such as forming a fixed loop in the middle of a long climbing rope.

Many knots normally tied with an end also have a form which is tied in the bight (for example, the bowline and the bowline on a bight). In other cases, a knot being tied in the bight is a matter of the method of tying rather than a difference in the completed form of the knot. For example, the clove hitch can be made "in the bight" if it is being slipped over the end of a post or into an open carabiner but not if being cast onto a closed ring, which requires access to an end of the rope.

== Examples ==
Bight examples
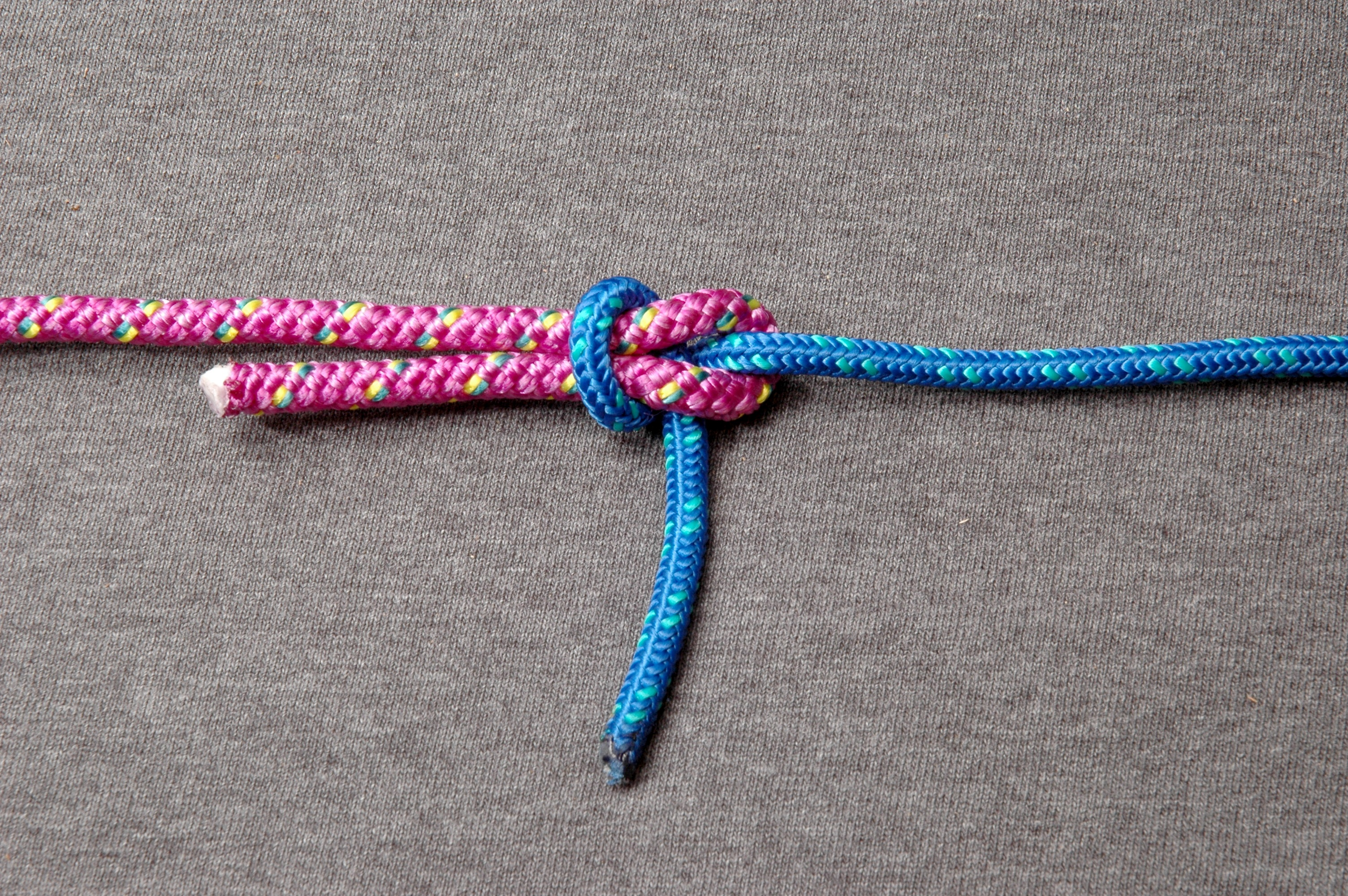
The blue rope (right) is half-hitched through and around a bight of the red rope (left) in this sheet bend.

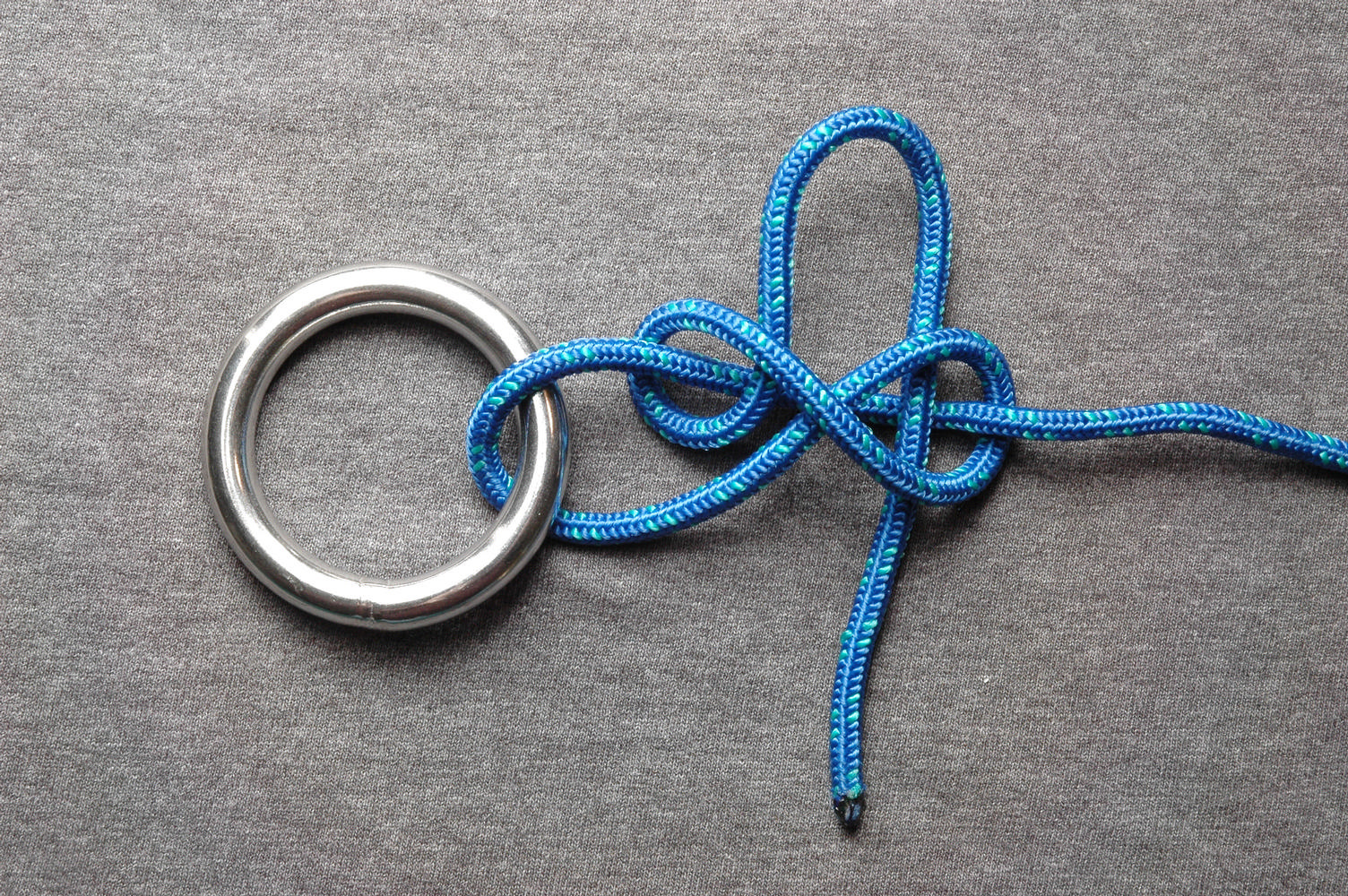
The final tuck of this slipped buntline hitch is made with a bight rather than the end, making it easier to release after tightening.

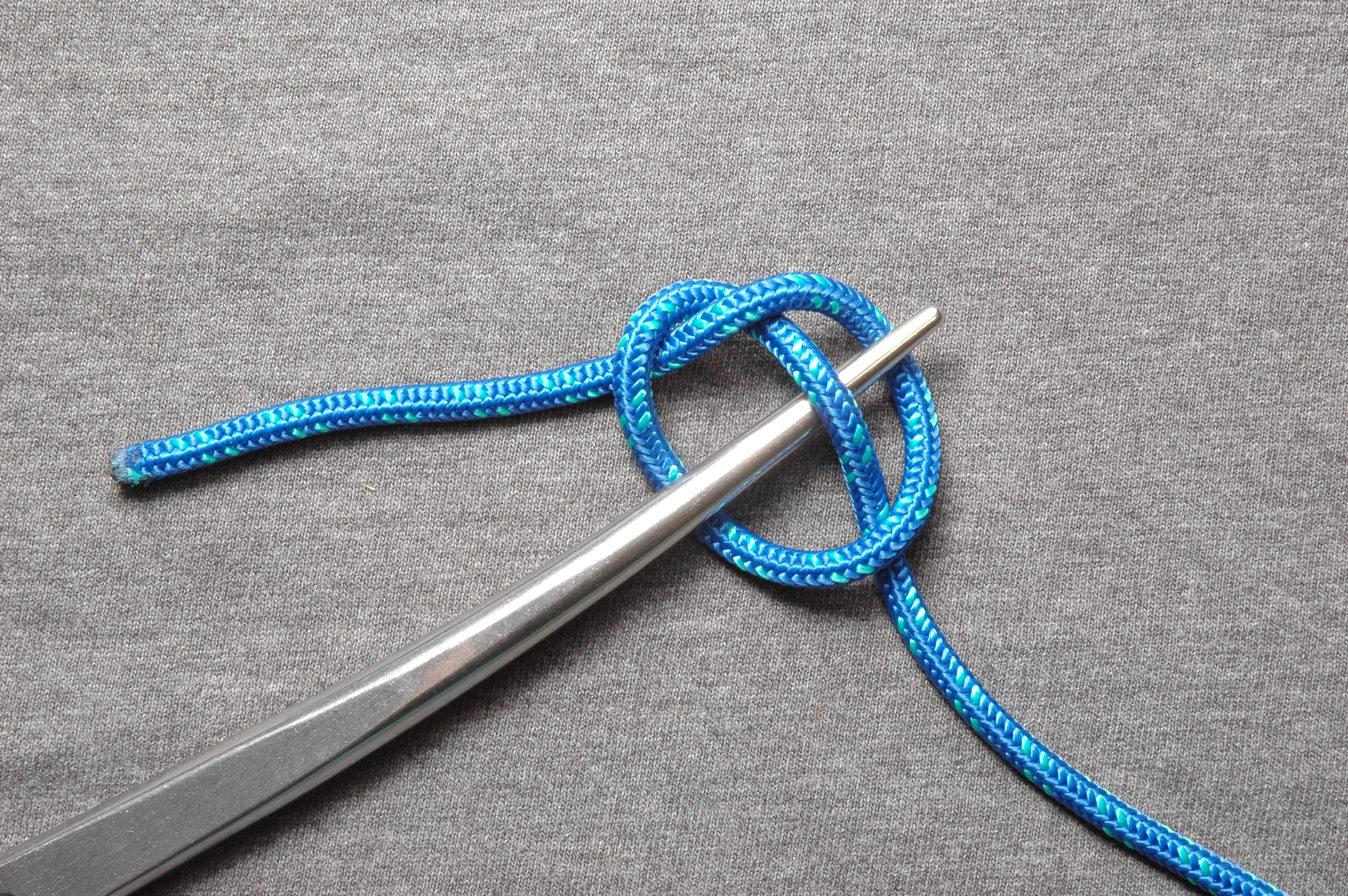
In the tying of a marlinespike hitch, a bight of the standing part is snagged through the loop.

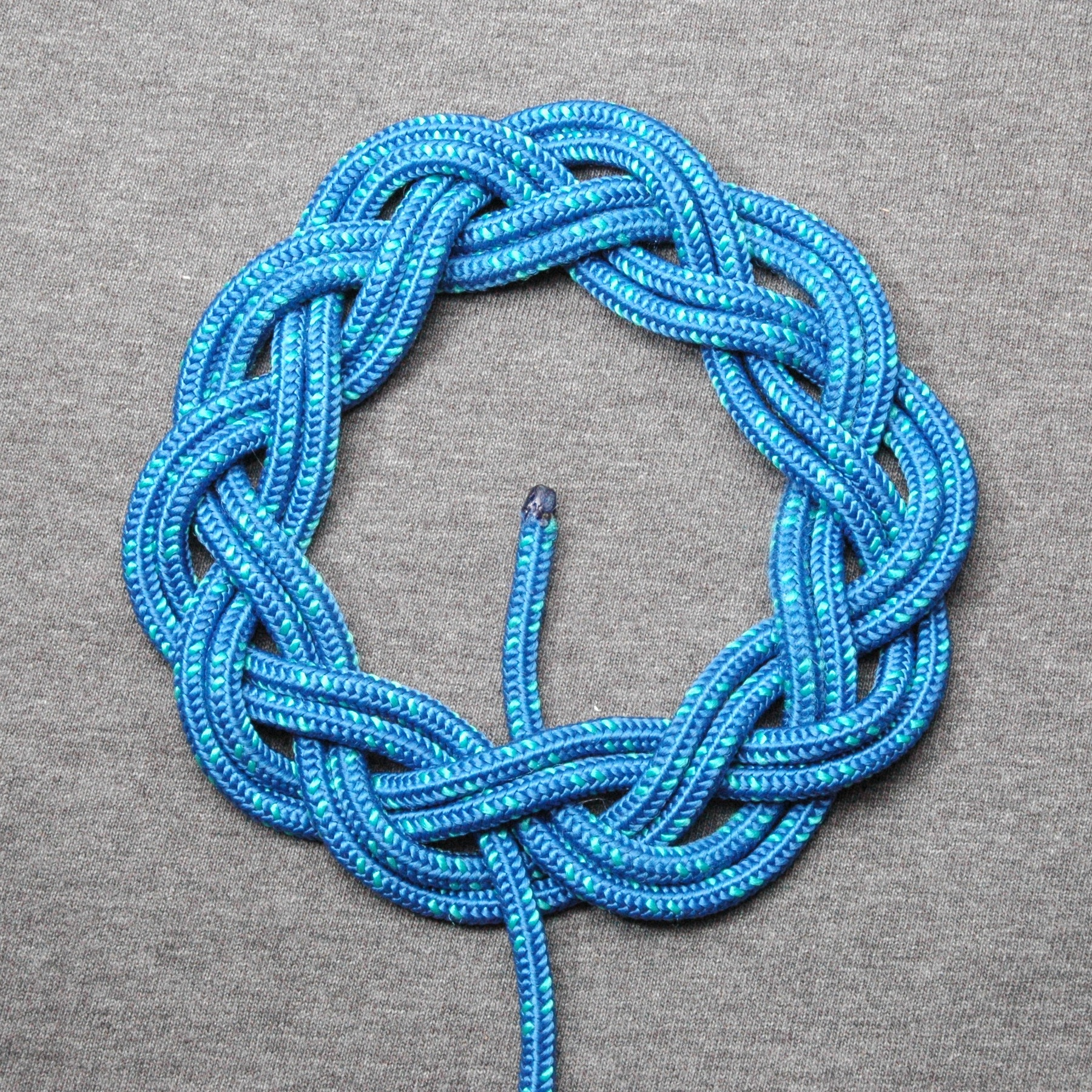
The bights, in the case of this 3-lead 10-bight Turk's head knot, are the scallops along the perimeter of the knot.

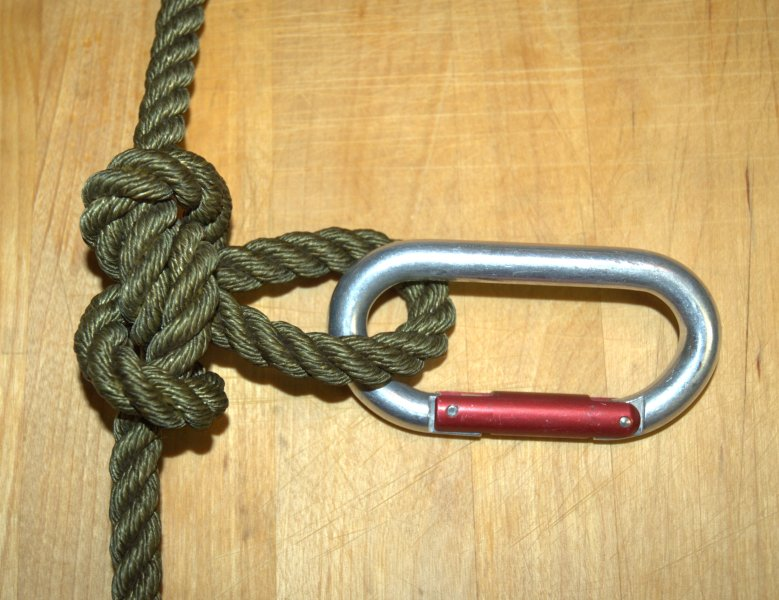
The alpine butterfly knot is a climbing knot which is tied in the bight and forms a reliable fixed loop.

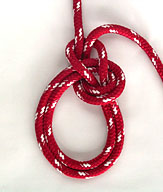
The bowline on a bight forms two fixed loops in the middle of a rope.

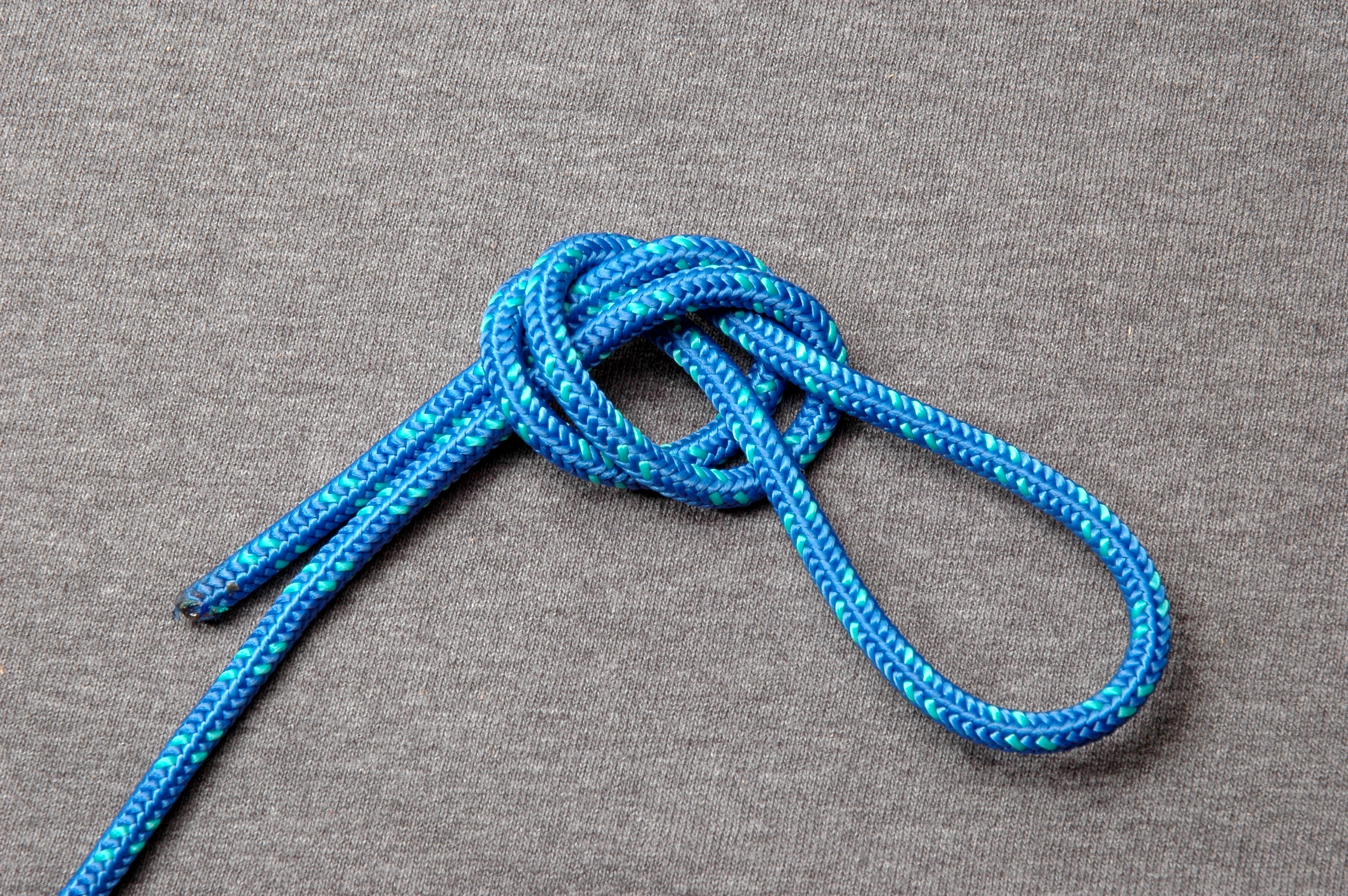
An overhand knot tied in the bight results in an overhand loop.

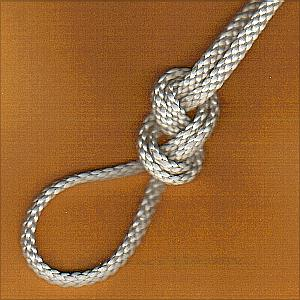
A figure-eight knot tied in the bight results in a figure-eight loop.

== Bibliography ==
- Ashley, Clifford W. (1944). The Ashley Book of Knots. New York: Doubleday. ISBN 9780385040259.
- Budworth, Geoffrey (2002). The Illustrated Encyclopedia of Knots. ISBN 9781585746262.
