= List of knot terminology =

This page explains commonly used terms related to knots.

== B ==
=== Bend ===
A bend is a knot used to join two lengths of rope.

=== Bight ===
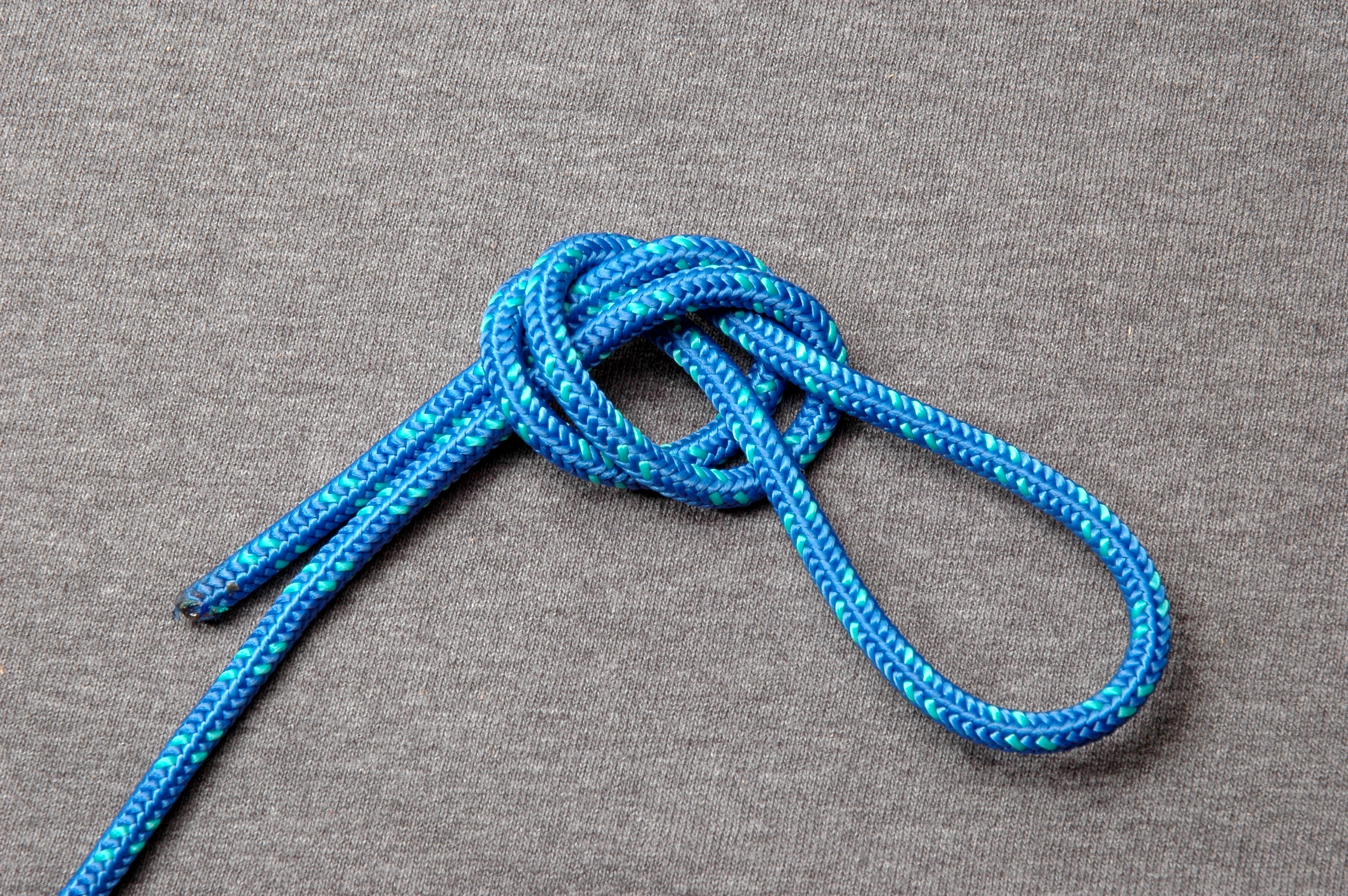
When an overhand knot is tied with a bight instead of an end of the rope, the result is an overhand loop

A bight is a slack part in the middle of a rope, usually a curve or loop. Knots that can be tied without access to either end of the rope are called knots in the bight. To tie a knot with a bight is to double up the rope into a bight and then tie the knot using the double rope.

=== Binding knot ===
Binding knots are knots that either constrict a single object or hold two objects snugly together. Whippings, seizings and lashings serve a similar purpose to binding knots, but contain too many wraps to be properly called a knot. In binding knots, the ends of rope are either joined together or tucked under the turns of the knot.

=== Bitter end ===
Another term for the working end. In its original meaning, and still today in strict nautical meaning, the bitter end was the opposite end of a rope or cable, from the working end, and not the same. The name comes from the "bitts" or "cable bitts", which were fixtures comprising a pair of strongly fixed posts used on wooden sailing ships to attach the inboard end of the anchor cable. The outboard end of a rope or cable, on the contrary, is the "working end". The phrase "to reach the bitter end" is a metaphor for reaching the end of the anchor cable; paying it out until there is no more left.

== C ==
=== Capsizing ===
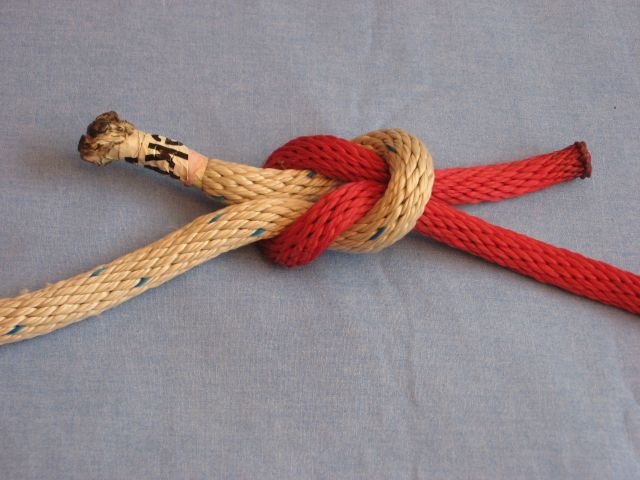
The reef knot can capsize if one of its standing ends is pulled.

A knot that has capsized or spilled has deformed into a different structure. Although capsizing is sometimes the result of incorrect tying or misuse, it can also be done purposefully in certain cases to strengthen the knot (see the carrick bend) or to untie a seized knot which would otherwise be difficult to release (see reef knot).

=== Chirality ===
Chirality is the 'handedness' of a knot. Topologically speaking, a knot and its mirror image may or may not have knot equivalence.

== D ==
=== Decorative knot ===
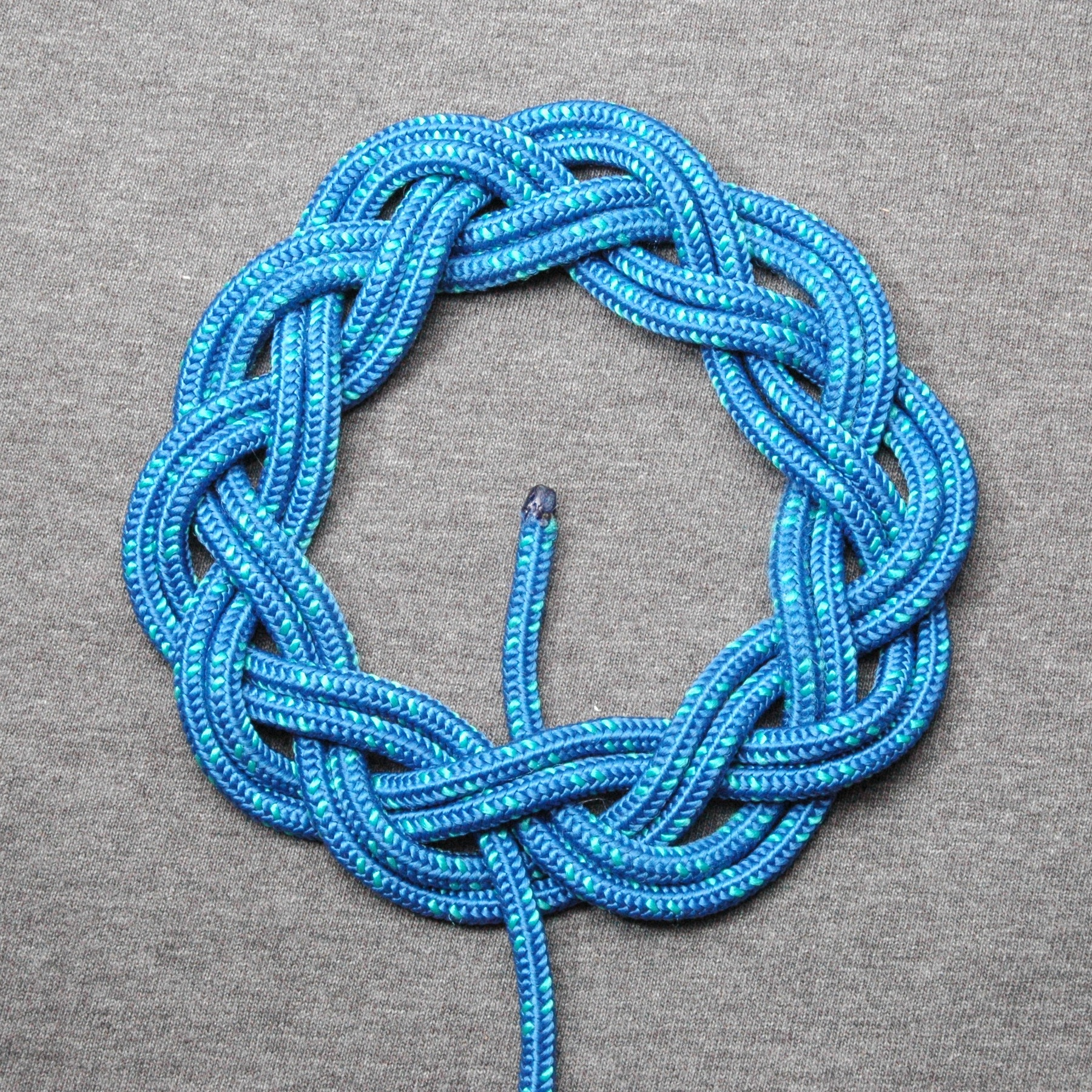
Although primarily tied for decorative purposes, the Turk's head knot can serve as a hand grip when tied around a cylindrical object.

A decorative knot is any aesthetically pleasing knot. Although it is not necessarily the case, most decorative knots also have practical applications or were derived from other well-known knots. Decorative knotting is one of the oldest and most widely distributed types of folk art.

=== Dressing ===
Knot dressing is the process of arranging a knot in such a way as to improve its performance. Crossing or uncrossing the rope in a specific way, depending on the knot, can increase the knot's strength as well as reduce its jamming potential.

== E ==
=== Elbow ===
An elbow refers to any two nearby crossings of a rope. An elbow is created when an additional twist is made in a loop.

=== Eye ===
The eye is in fact what is often (in error) referred to as a loop. The eye functions in the same way as an eye bolt or an eye splice. The eye provides a means to form connections. The eye of a knot (or a splice) is fixed and does not slip. If it slipped, it would not function as an eye - it would act like a noose.

== F ==
=== Flake ===
A flake refers to any number of turns in a coiled rope. Likewise, to flake a rope means to coil it.

"Flaking" or "Faking" also means to lay a rope on a surface ready to use or to run out quickly without tangles.

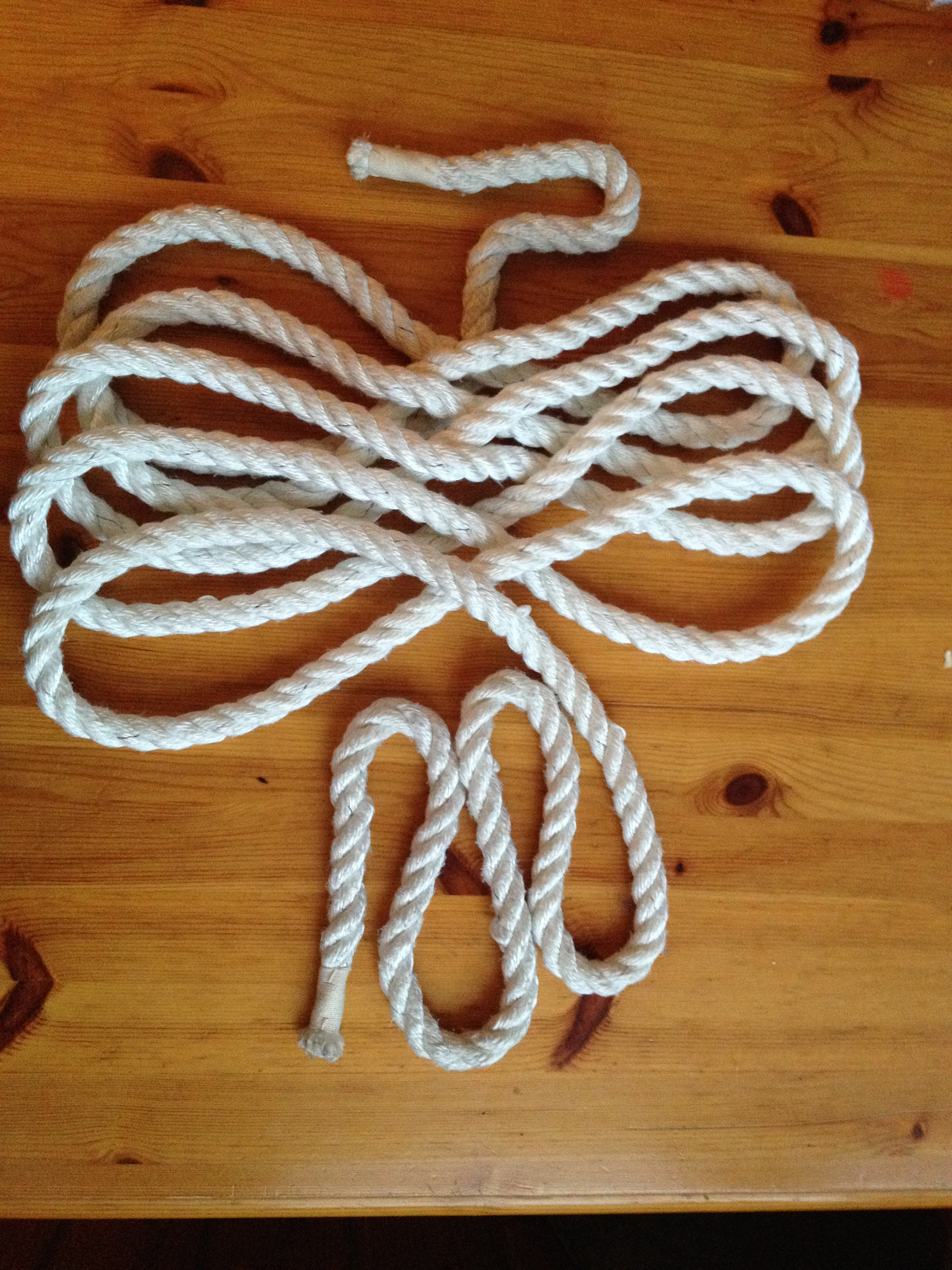
Figure-8 flake

=== Fraps ===
Fraps or "frapping turns" are a set of loops coiled perpendicularly around the wraps of a lashing as a means of tightening.

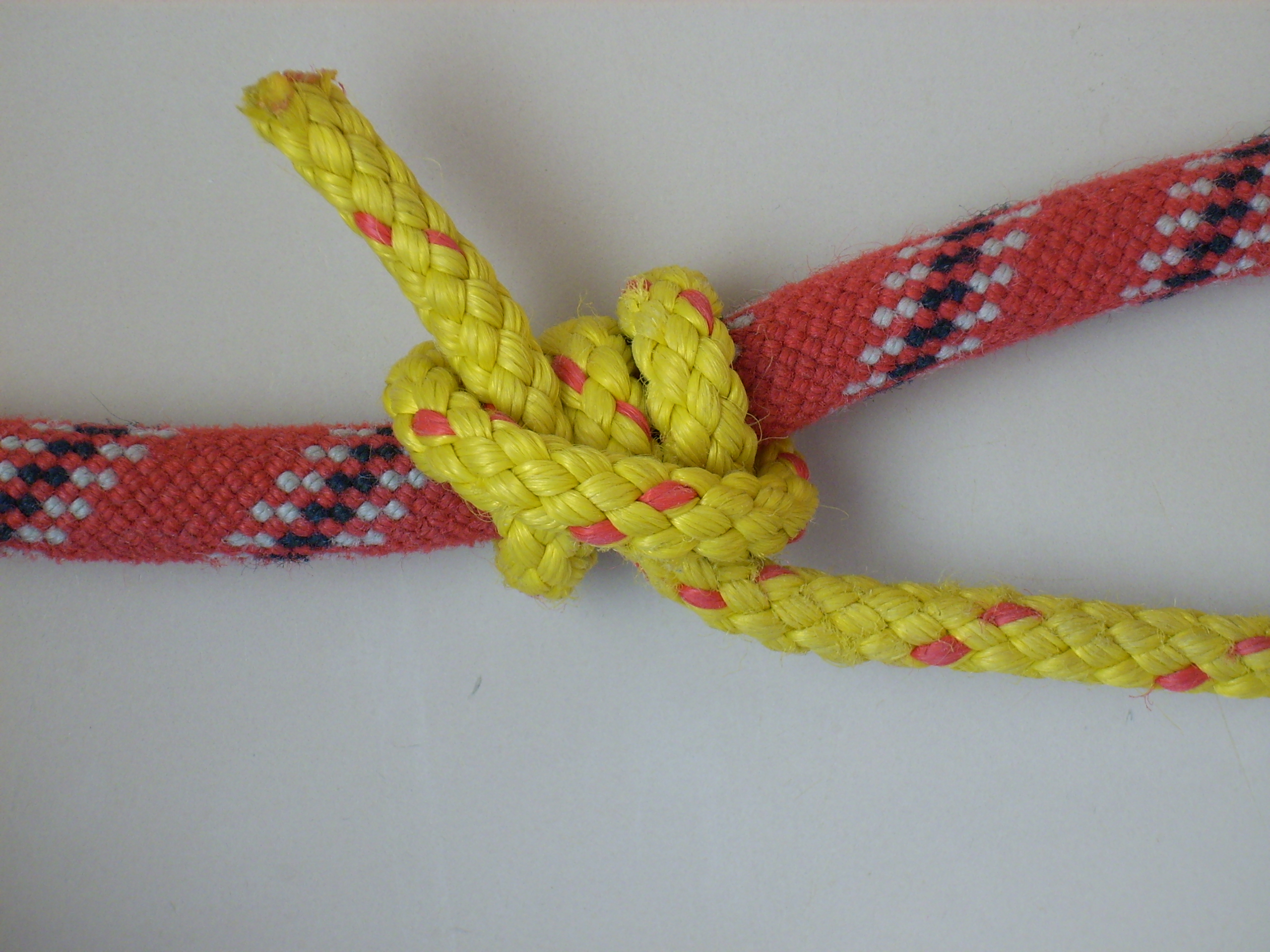
The rolling hitch is a common type of friction hitch.

=== Friction hitch ===
A friction hitch is a knot that attaches one rope to another in a way that allows the knot's position to easily be adjusted. Sometimes friction hitches are called slide-and-grip knots. They are often used in climbing applications.

== H ==
=== Hitch ===
A hitch is a knot that attaches a rope to some object, often a ring, rail, spar, post, or perhaps another rope, as in the case of the rolling hitch.

== J ==
=== Jamming ===
A jamming knot is any knot that becomes very difficult to untie after use. Knots that are resistant to jamming are called non-jamming knots. Jamming knots include #1230, #1727, and #1994 in The Ashley Book of Knots.

== L ==
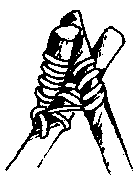
A tripod lashing

=== Lashing ===
A lashing is an arrangement of rope used to secure two or more items together in a rigid manner. Common uses include the joining of scaffolding poles and the securing of sailing masts. The square lashing, diagonal lashing, and shear lashing are well-known lashings used to bind poles perpendicularly, diagonally, and in parallel, respectively.

=== Loop ===
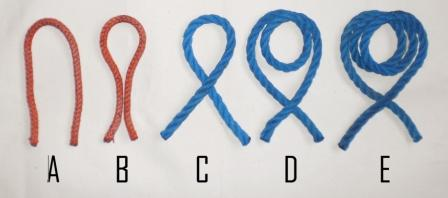
A: open loop, B: closed loop, C: turn, D: round turn, and E: two round turns

In reference to knots, loop may refer to:

- One of the fundamental structures used to tie knots. Specifically, it is a U-form narrower than a bight.
- A type of knot used to create a closed circle in a line.

A loop is one of the fundamental structures used to tie knots. It is a full circle formed by passing the working end of a rope over itself. When the legs of a closed loop are crossed to form a loop, the rope has taken a turn.

=== Loop knot ===
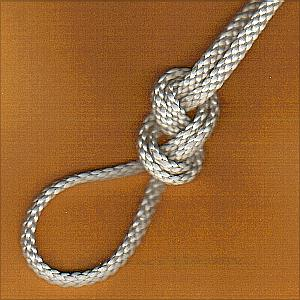
The figure-eight loop is a common loop knot.

A loop knot is a type of knot that creates a fixed loop on the rope, where "fixed" means that pulling on the rope does not cause the loop to slide or shrink. In contrast to a hitch, the loop formed by a loop knot maintains its structure regardless of whether or not the loop is around an object.

A loop can be formed by tying "in the bight" or otherwise. An example is the figure-eight loop knot, which can be tied in the bight, by tying a figure-eight knot using a bight instead of the end of the rope. However, tying the knot this way does not allow putting the loop around a fixed object like a tree; to do that, the knot must be tied in a two-stage process by first tying a figure-eight knot, running the end of the rope around the fixed object, and then threading the rope back through and around the figure-8 knot to create the final figure-8 loop knot.

== N ==
=== Noose ===
A noose can refer to any sliding loop in which the loop tightens when pulled.

== O ==
=== Open loop ===
An open loop is a curve in a rope that resembles a semicircle in which the legs are not touching or crossed. The legs of an open loop are brought together narrower than they are in a bight.

== S ==
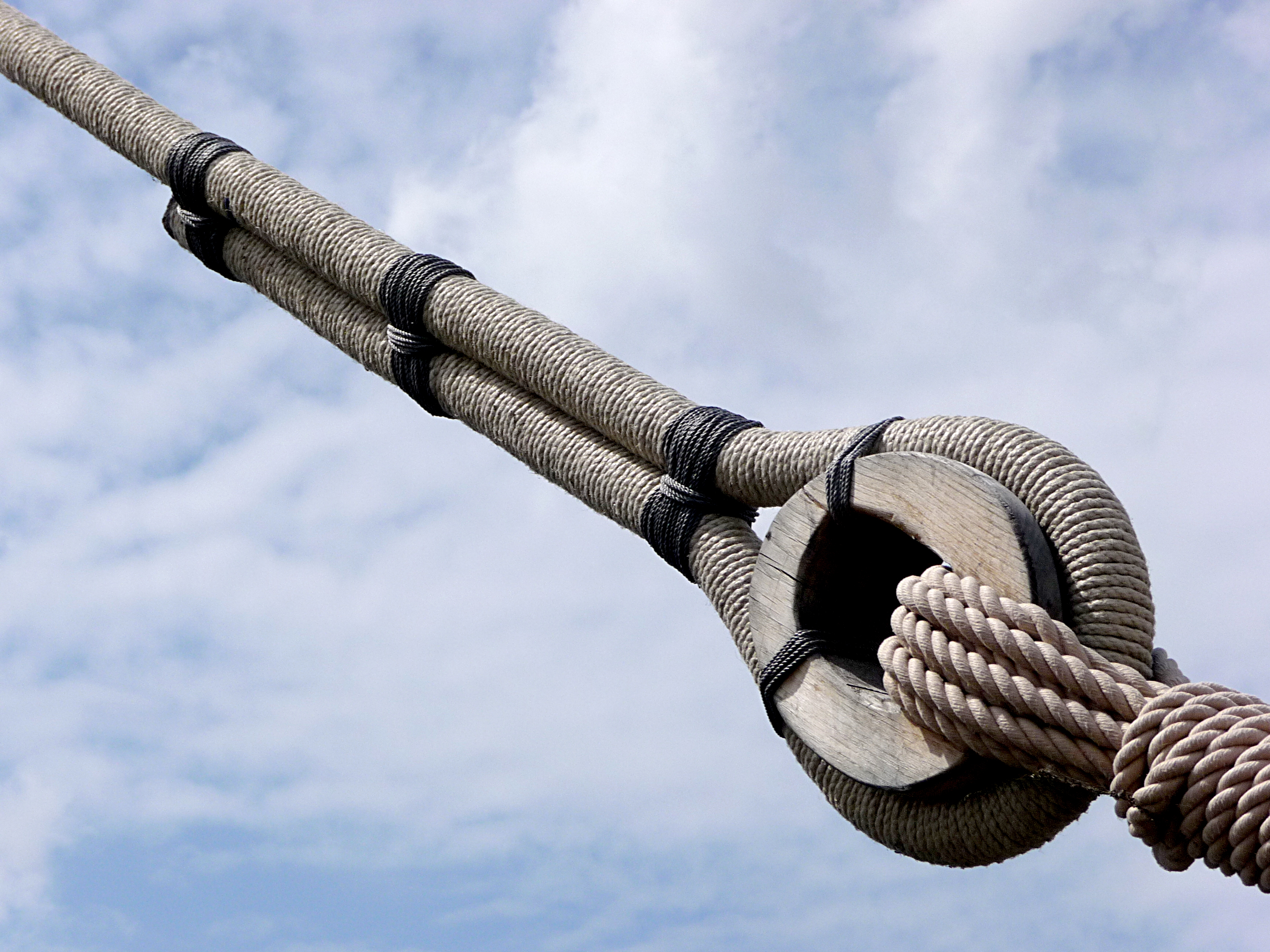
The eye of a forestay is secured by three round seizings

=== Seizing ===
A seizing is a knot that binds two pieces of rope together side by side, normally in order to create a loop. The structure of seizings is similar to that of lashings.

=== Setting ===
Setting a knot is the process of tightening it. Improper setting can cause certain knots to underperform.

=== Slipped knot ===
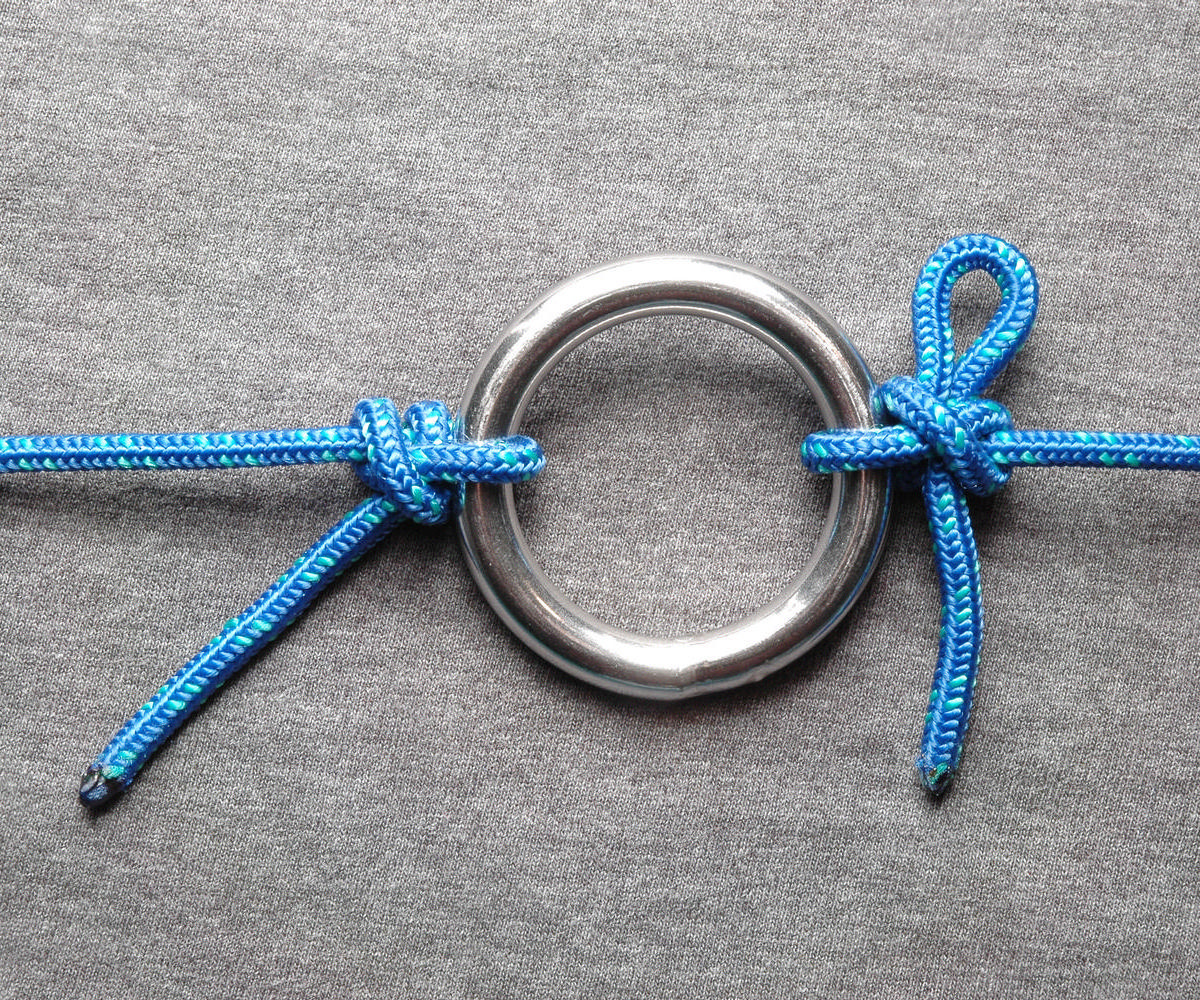
The slipped form of the buntline hitch (on the right) can easily be untied by pulling the hanging end and withdrawing the loop.

A slipped knot is any knot that unties when an end is pulled. Thus, tying the slipped form of a knot makes it easier to untie, especially when the knot is prone to jamming. A slip knot is just one variety of slipped knot.

=== Small-stuff ===
Small-stuff is a nautical and knot-tying term for thin string or twine, as opposed to the thick, heavy ropes that are more often used in sailing. It is commonly used in a whipping to bind the ends of ropes to prevent fraying.

Historically, the term referred to cordage less than one inch in circumference. Much of the small-stuff on board ships, especially that used for decorative or fancy ropework, was made by the sailors themselves reusing materials unlaid from old and leftover pieces of larger rope and cable.

=== Splice ===
Splicing is a method of joining two ropes done by untwisting and then re-weaving the rope's strands.

=== Standing end ===
The standing end (or standing part) of a rope is the part that is not active in knot tying. The opposite end is the working end.

=== Stopper knot ===
A stopper knot is the type of knot tied to prevent a rope from slipping through a grommet. The overhand knot is the simplest single-strand stopper knot.

== T ==
=== Turn ===
A turn is one round of rope on a pin or cleat, or one round of a coil.

== W ==
=== Whipping ===
A whipping is a binding knot tied around the end of a rope to prevent the rope from unraveling.

=== Working end ===
The working end (or working part) of a rope is the part active in knot tying. The opposite end is the standing end.

== See also ==
- List of knots
