= Harness bend =

Bend knot for joining ropes

- Category: Bend
- Typical use: Joining two ropes
- ABoK: #1474

The harness bend is a general purpose bend knot used to join two ropes together. The knot can be tied under tension and will not capsize.

== Tying ==
The harness knot is essentially one half hitch and one crossing hitch each made by one of the two joined ropes, around the other ropes body. The ends get caught in between the two ropes and these two hitches, at the elliptical eye in the middle of the knot.

There are two other variants to this bend: a double harness bend with ends pointing in opposite directions, and a double harness bend with parallel ends i.e. with ends pointing in the same direction. The starting side of one of the hitches has to be different, in order to have the ends approach the elliptical eye in the middle, from the prescribed direction.

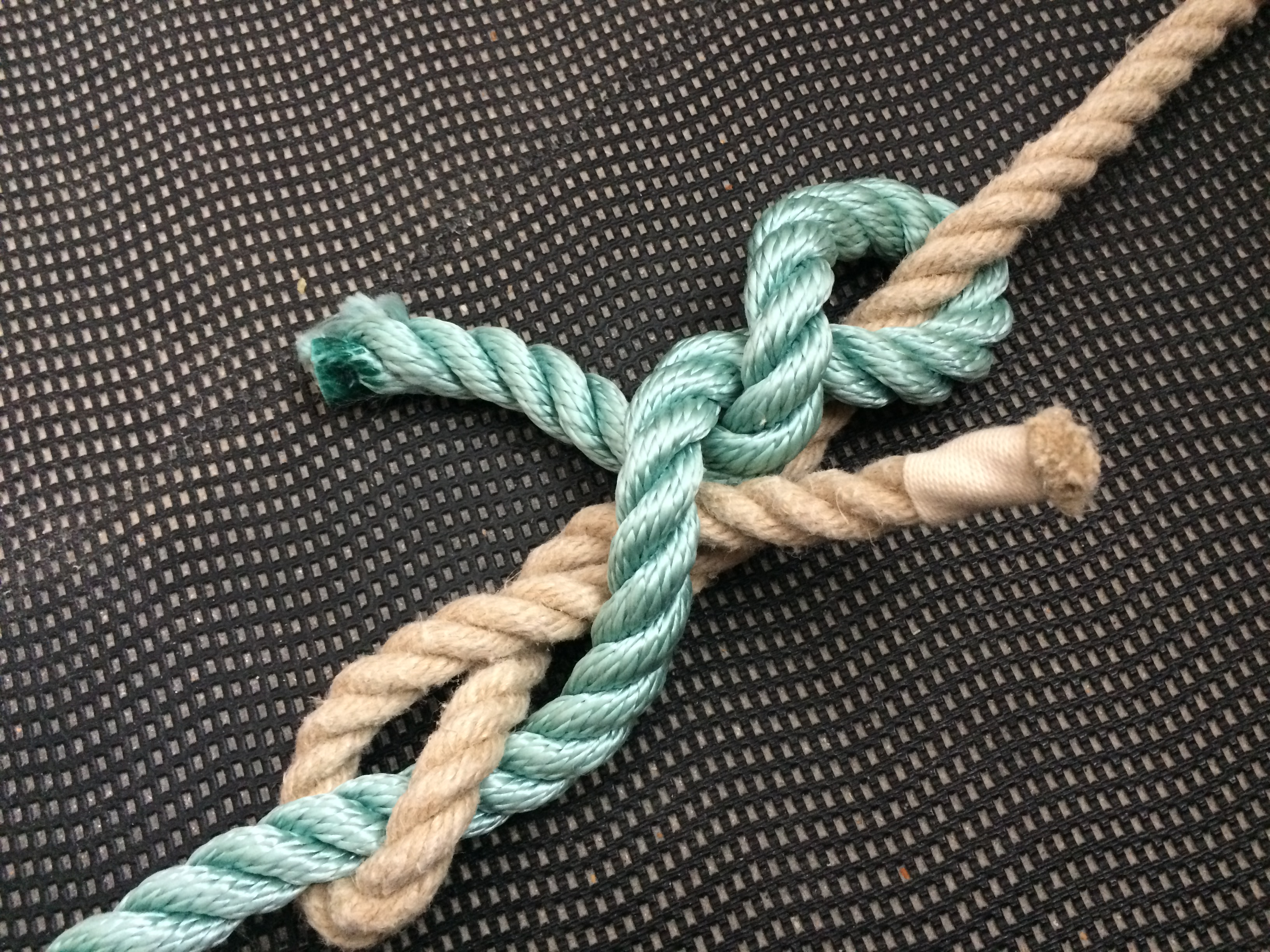
Double harness bend ABOK #1420 - untightened

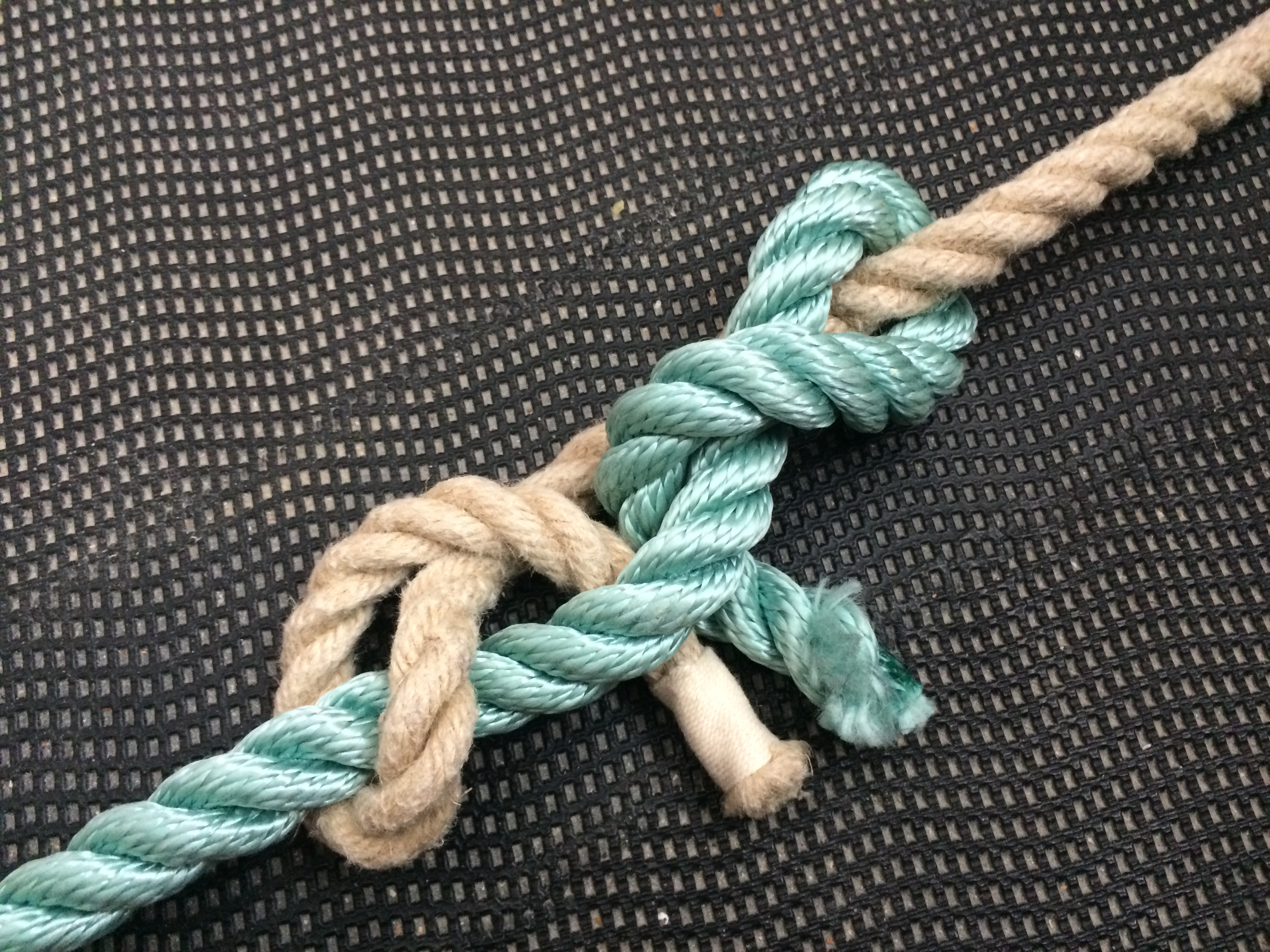
Double harness bend with parallel ends ABOK #1421 - untightened

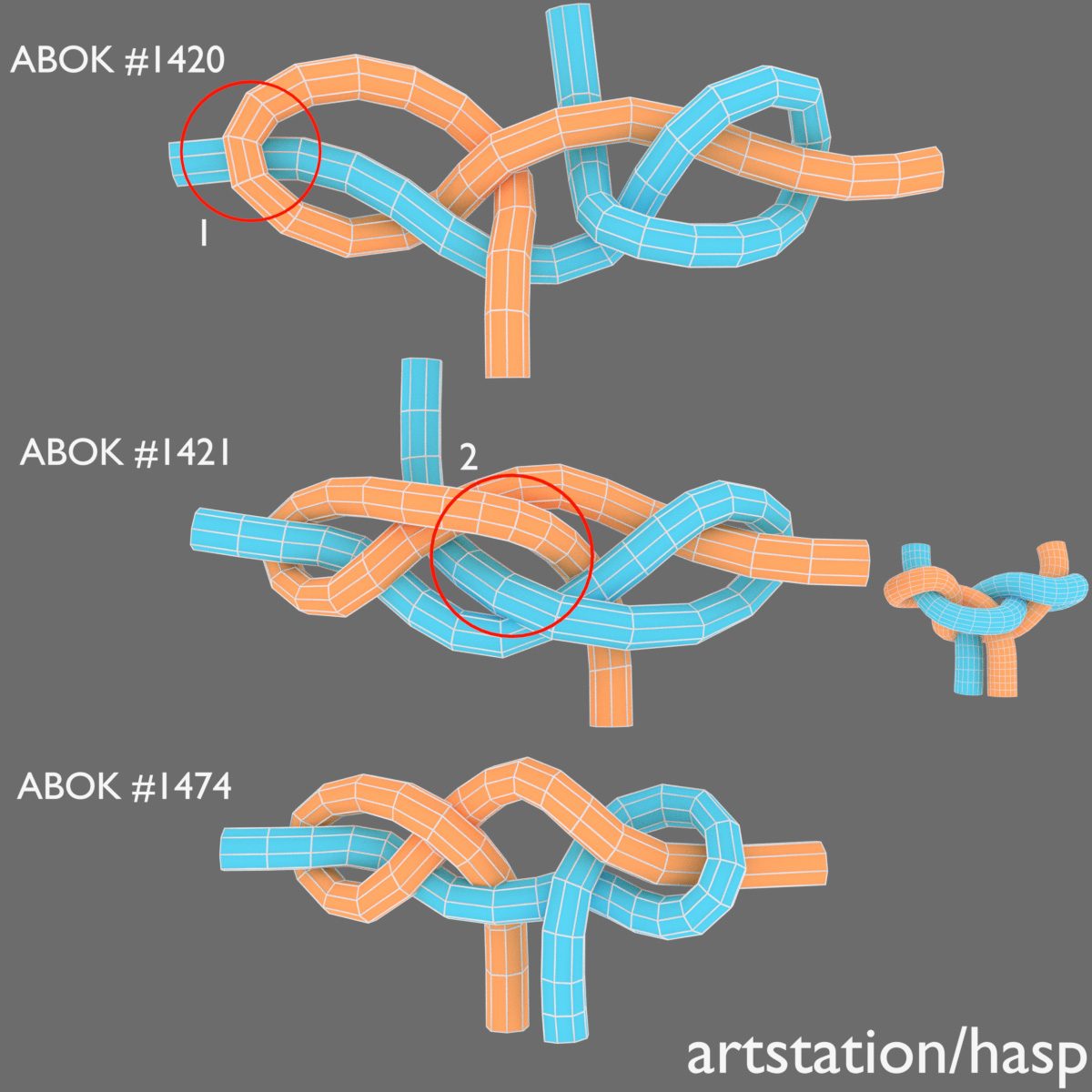
2 - sometimes ends are crossed, sometimes are not - like in abok 1420

== Relationship to other knots ==
The double harness bend is an unfinished Fisherman's knot (or even a Double fisherman's knot): the end needs to go through its own half hitch (twice) to form a (double) overhand knot.

The double harness bend is an unfinished Blood knot: The half hitches need to take one or several turns around both ropes before going through the eye in the middle.

The double harness bend with parallel ends is an unfinished Reever knot: The ends need to go through the opposite half hitch, to be lined up with its own rope body.

All these knots are more secure than the harness knot but they are not as easy to untie.

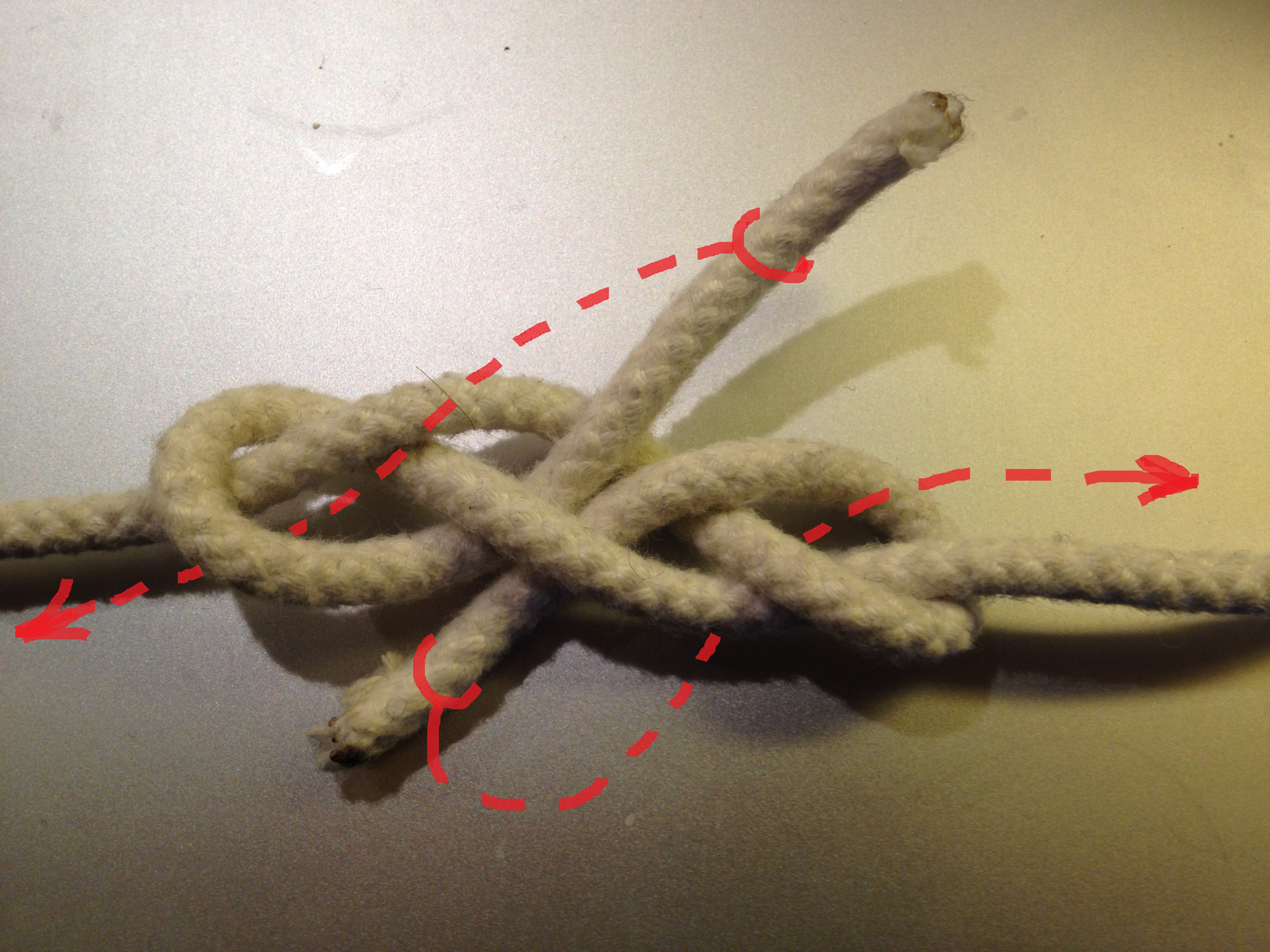
From double harness bend ABOK #1420 to Fishermans bend: ends through own half hitch

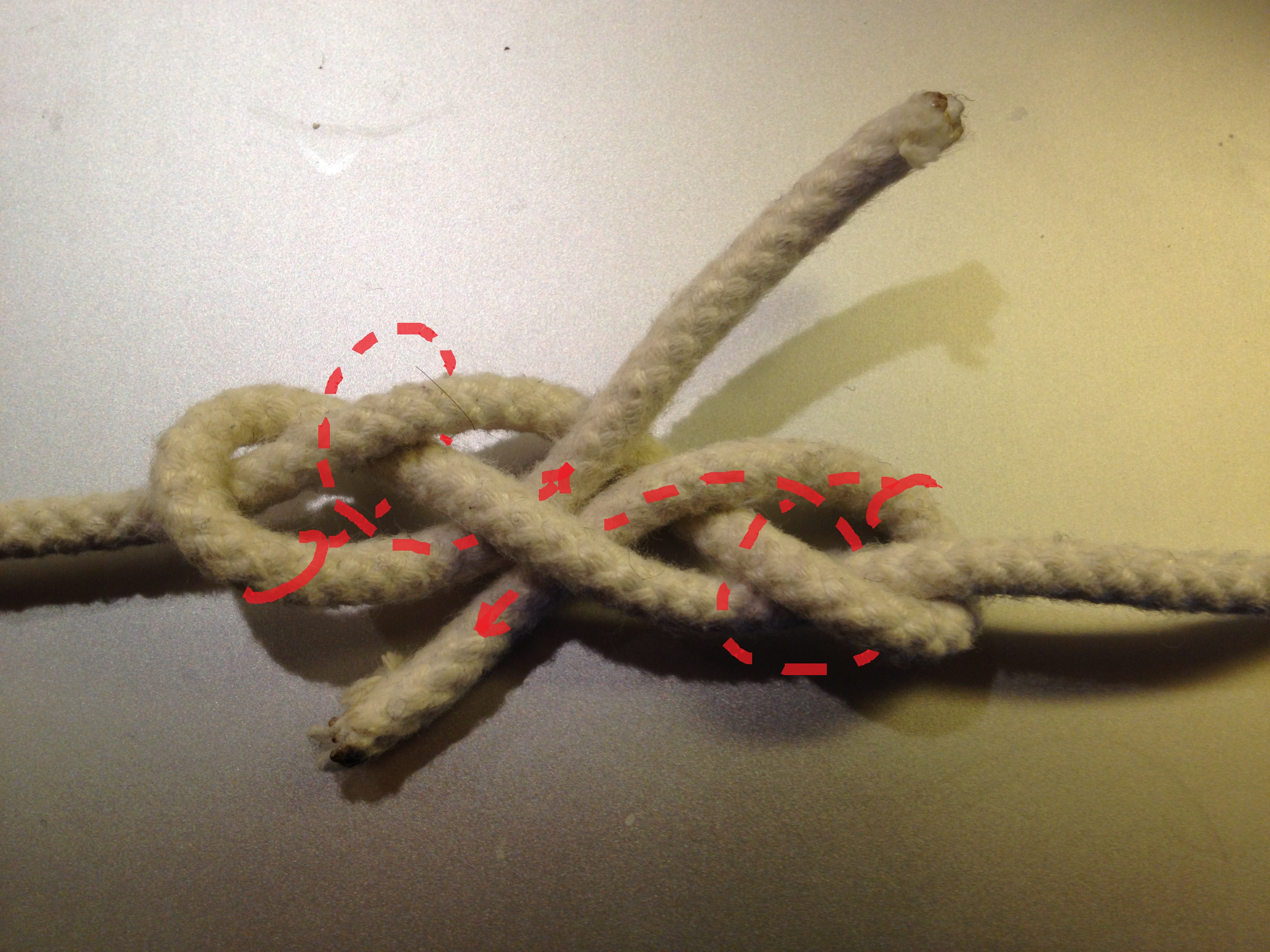
From double harness bend ABOK #1420 to Blood knot: ends take full rounds around both ropes before the half hitch

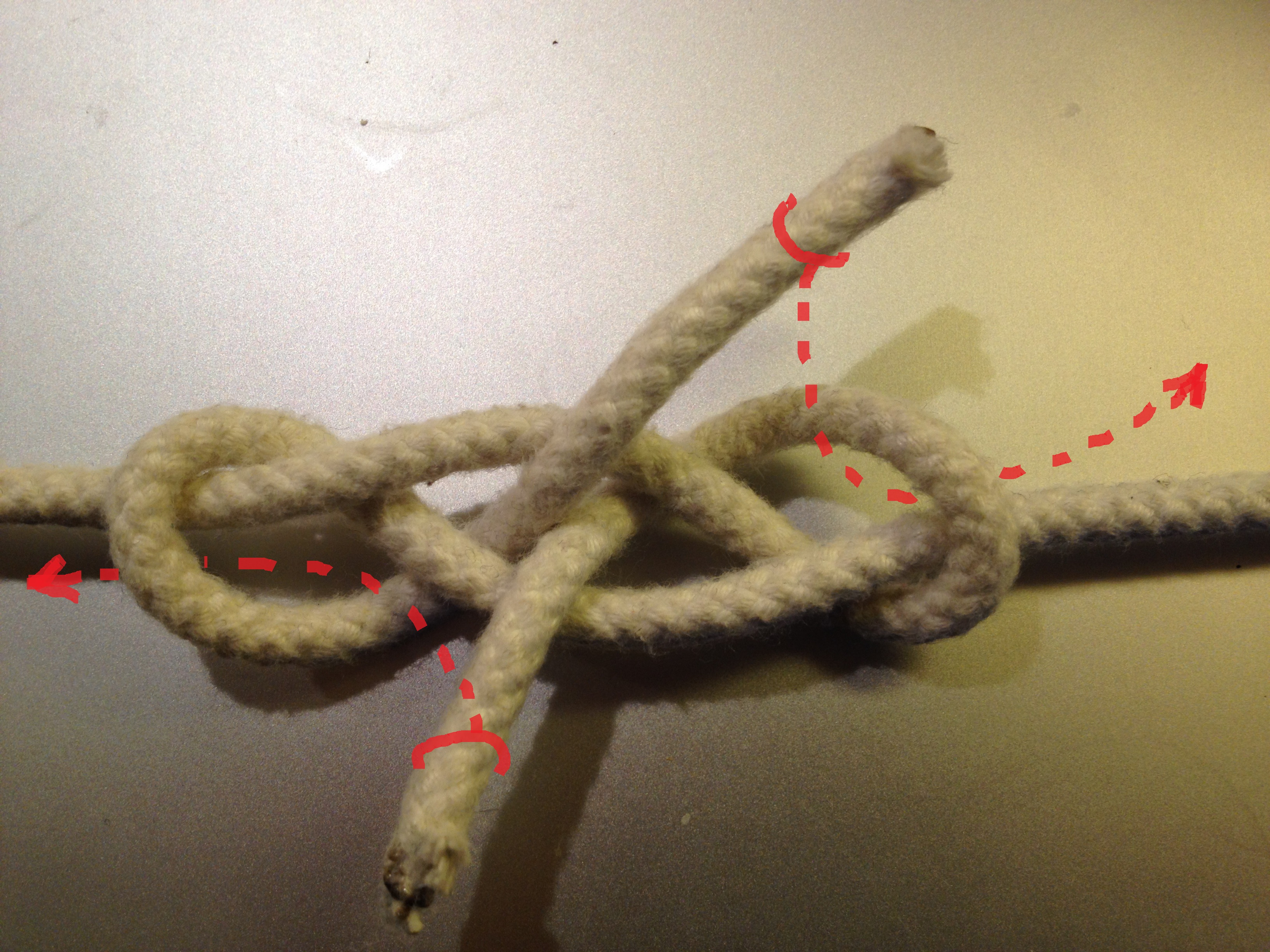
From double harness bend with parallel ends ABOK #1421 to Reever bend: ends through opposite half hitch

== Use ==
The harness bend is useful when one needs to tighten the slack in a binding loop before locking the knot in the tight position. The name probably comes from the use in fixing the saddle on the back of the horse, tightening as soon as the horse that has learned to inhale at first move, exhales.

In situations where a more professional quick and secure packing is required, it may be more proper not to tie a harness bend starting with a crossing hitch and locking with a half hitch, but another more reliable combination of loop to tighten in, and hitch to lock with, such as these:

- a Packer's knot starting with a figure-eight knot and locking with a half hitch,
- a corned beef knot starting with a buntline hitch and locking with a half hitch,
- another alternative is starting with a bowline and locking with a sheet bend
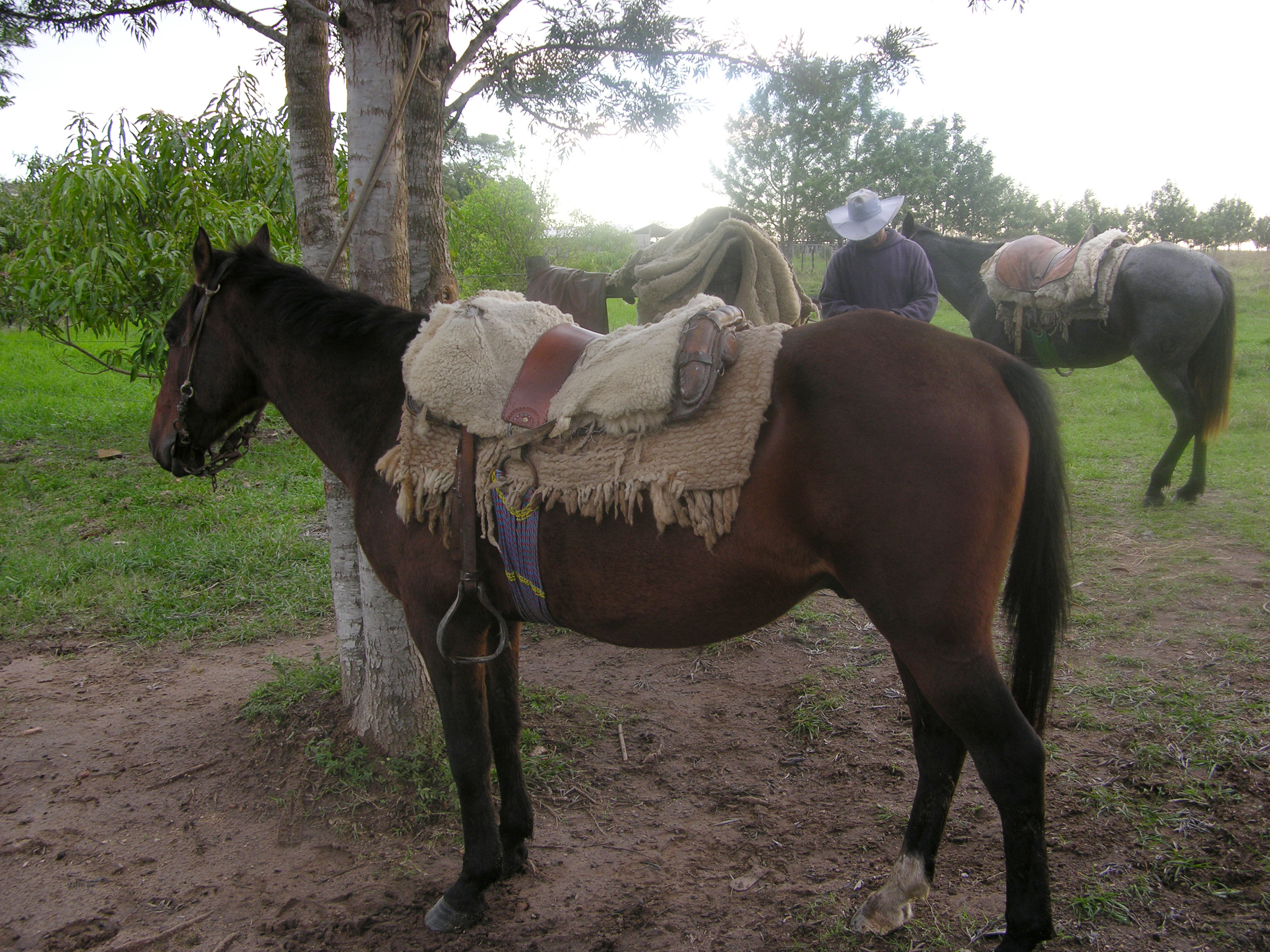
Harness of leather and blue fabric band

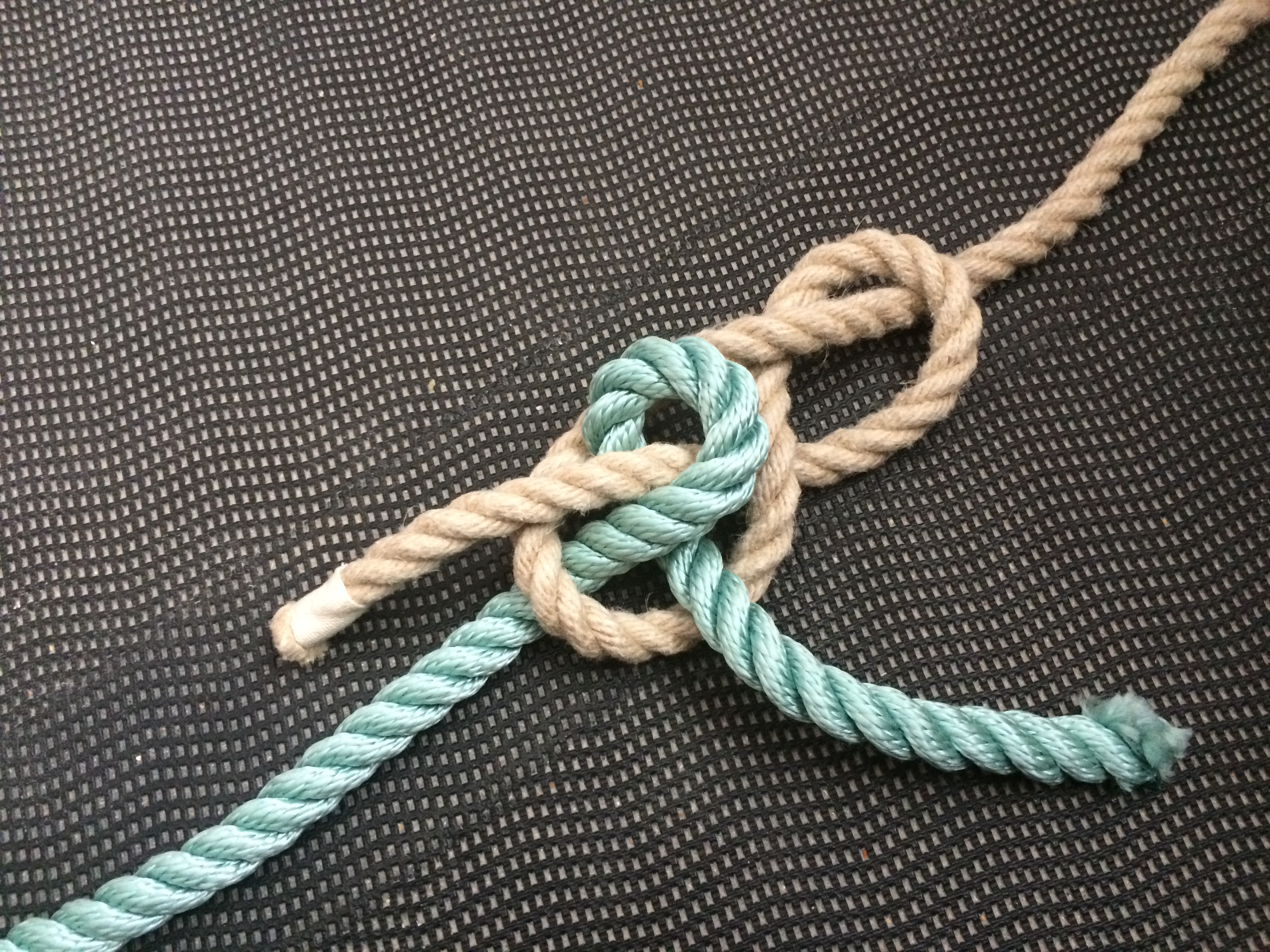
Packers knot

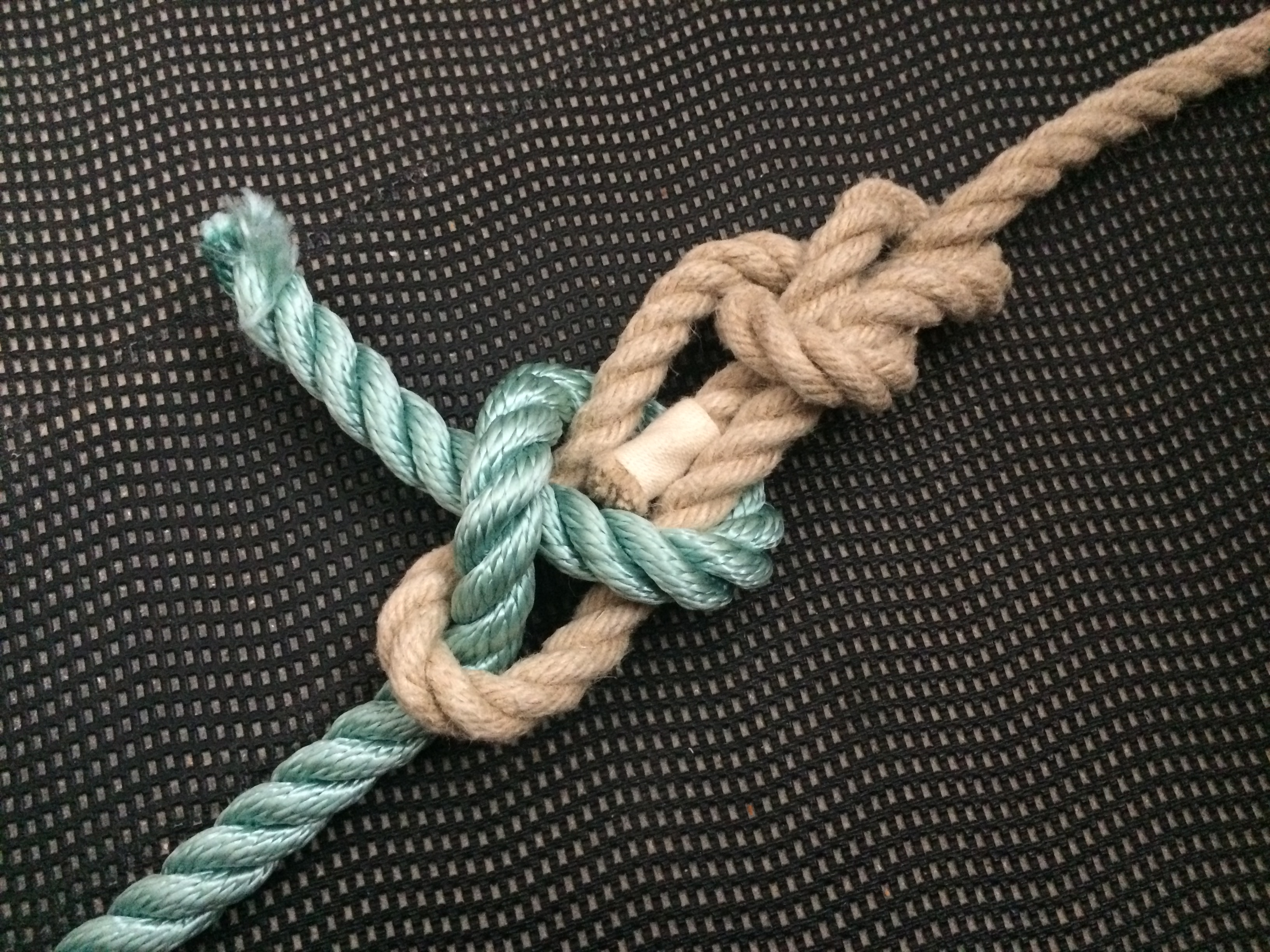
Sheet bend to bowline's loop

== See also ==
- List of bend knots
- List of knots
