= Lobster buoy hitch =

Type of hitch knot

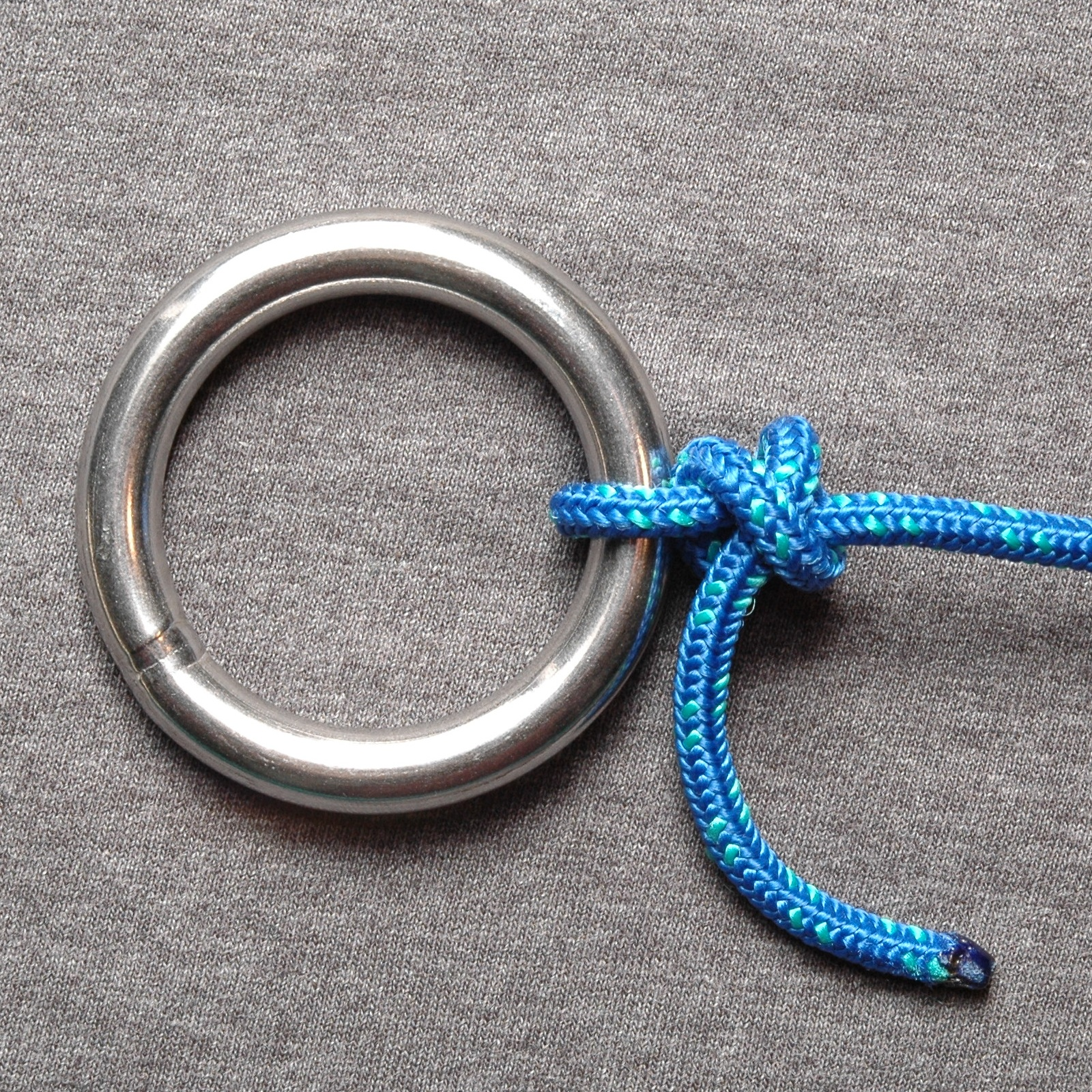
- Category: Hitch
- Related: Cow hitch, Buntline hitch, Two half-hitches
- Releasing: Jamming
- Typical use: attaching lines to rings, eyes, posts, rods, and railings
- ABoK: #58, #1714, #1839

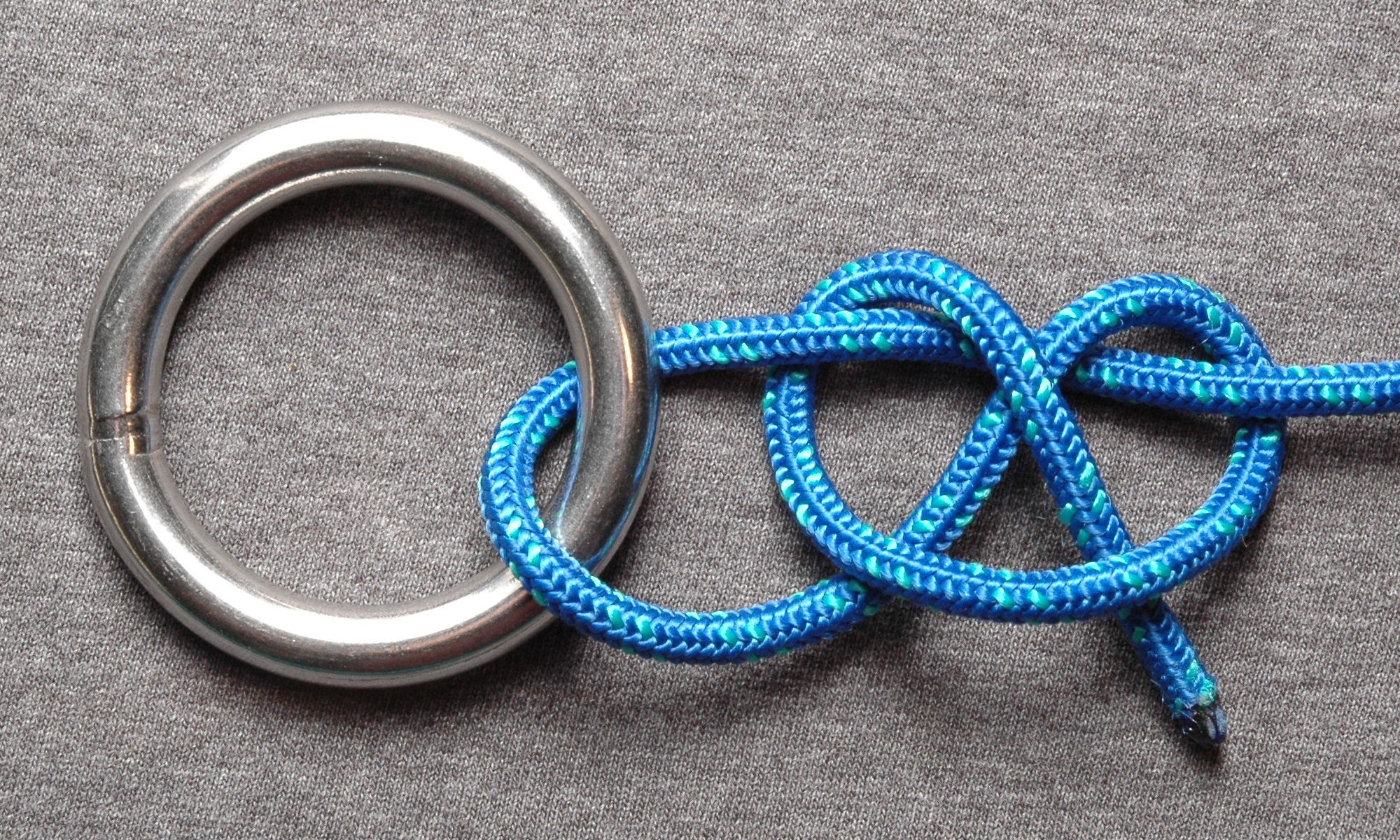
Untightened Lobster buoy hitch

The lobster buoy hitch is similar to the buntline hitch, but made with a cow hitch around the standing part rather than a clove hitch.

Like the buntline hitch, this knot is strong, secure and compact.

== See also ==
- List of knots
