= Highpoint hitch =

Type of knot

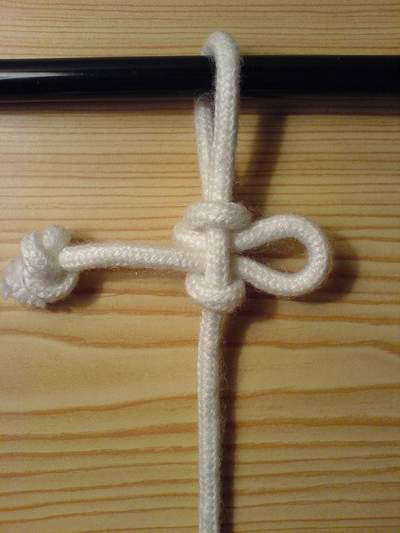
- Names: Highpoint hitch, High post hitch
- Category: Hitch
- Related: Buntline hitch
- Releasing: Non-jamming
- Typical use: Quick-release, draw loop hitch
- ABoK: #398, #1809

The highpoint hitch (or high post hitch) is a type of knot used to attach a rope to an object. The main feature of the hitch is that it is very secure, yet if tied as a slipped knot it can be released quickly and easily with one pull, even after heavy loading. The highpoint hitch is tied in the same manner as a slipped buntline hitch until the final turn, where they diverge.

== Security ==
The highpoint hitch is very secure, since any load will tighten the turns against each other, at the same time tightening the grip on the working end.

== Releasing ==
To release the slipped version of this knot, pull the working end in the direction of the load. This action pulls the two turns apart at the same time as releasing the draw-loop, and the whole knot simply falls apart.

== Tying ==
To tie the hitch around a pole, begin by passing the working end a half turn round the pole. Next, pass a half turn round the standing part. Then, pass a half turn round both the working end and the standing part, above the first turn (i.e. closer to the pole). Finally, push a bight of the working end through the middle of the hitch - between the two half turns, and between the standing part and the working end. Pull on the standing part to tighten, if necessary sliding the hitch snugly up against the pole.

Tying the highpoint hitch

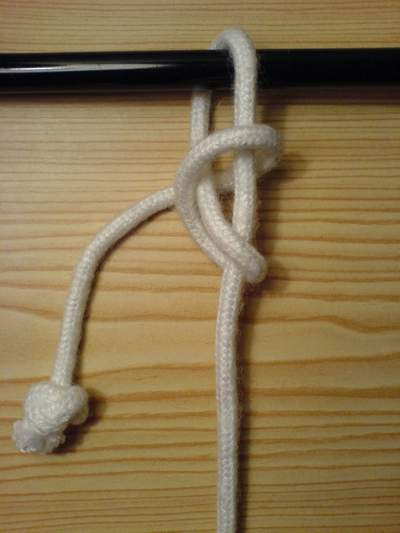
Partially tied slipped highpoint hitch

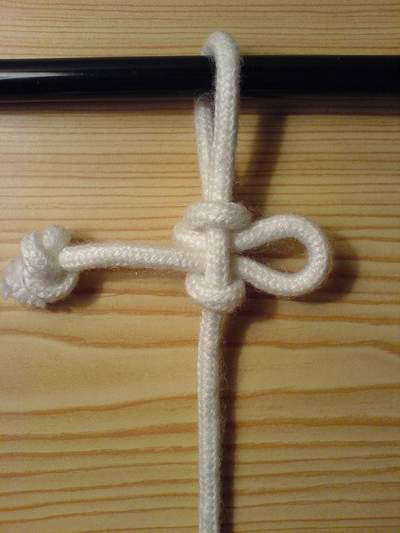
Completed slipped highpoint hitch
