= Half hitch =

Type of knot

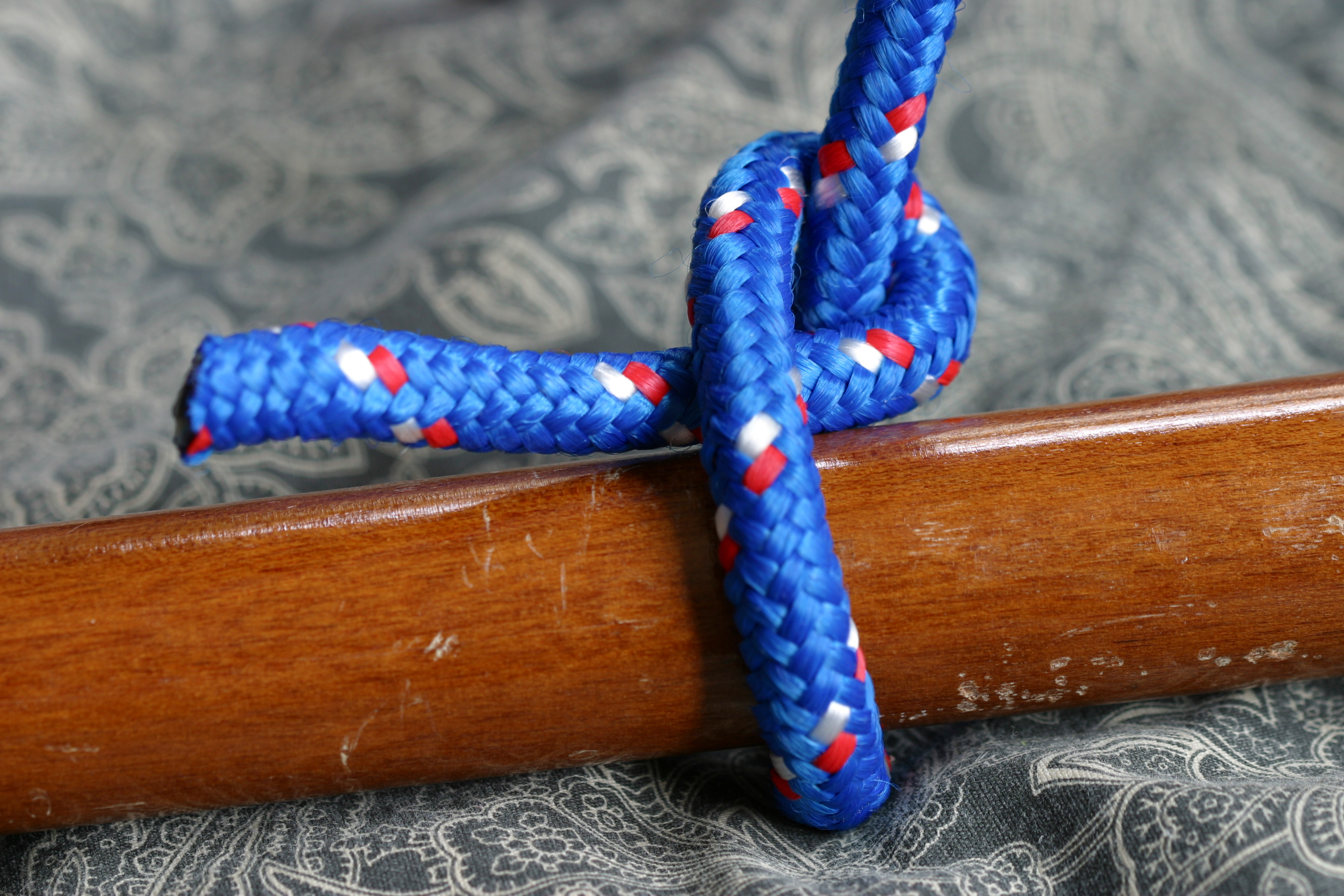
- A half hitch tied around a pole
- Category: Hitch
- Origin: Ancient
- Related: Two half-hitches, Clove hitch, Munter hitch, single hitch
- Releasing: Non-jamming
- Typical use: As part of other knots
- ABoK: #50, #1662, #1663, #1026, #1717, #1780

The half hitch is a simple hitch knot, where the working end of a line is brought over and under the standing part. Insecure on its own, it is a valuable component of a wide variety of useful and reliable hitches, bends, and knots.

The half hitch is tied with one end of a rope which is passed around an object and secured to its own standing part with a single hitch.

— The Ashley Book of Knots

Securing an additional single hitch to the rope's standing part produces the related knot two half-hitches.Alternatively, a half hitch may be made secure on its own by placing the final crossing opposite to the turn around the working end. This locks the end in place, and holds fast as long as the hitch is loaded by a steady pull. A half hitch in this configuration is sometimes used to tie strings to the bridge of a classical guitar.

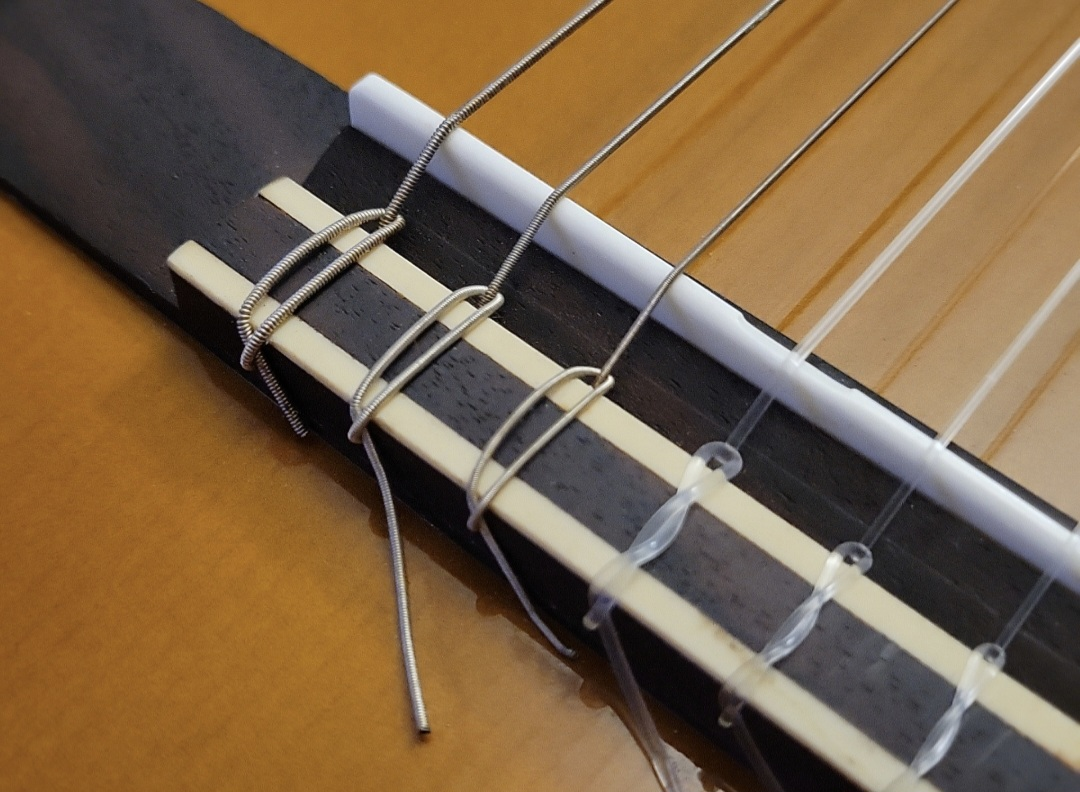
An instance of secure half-hitches, seen in the thicker strings on the left.

Another instance where a half hitch stands on its own without additional embellishment is when added to a timber hitch to help stabilize a load in the direction of pull. A timber hitch is tied on the far end of the load to bind it securely and a half hitch made at the forward end to serve as a guide for the rope. In this instance, the half hitch combined with a timber hitch is known as a killick hitch or kelleg hitch.

The knot is attractive to the eye and so is used decoratively for French whipping which is also known as half hitch whipping.

== See also ==
- List of knots
- Buntline hitch
