= Packer's knot =

Type of knot

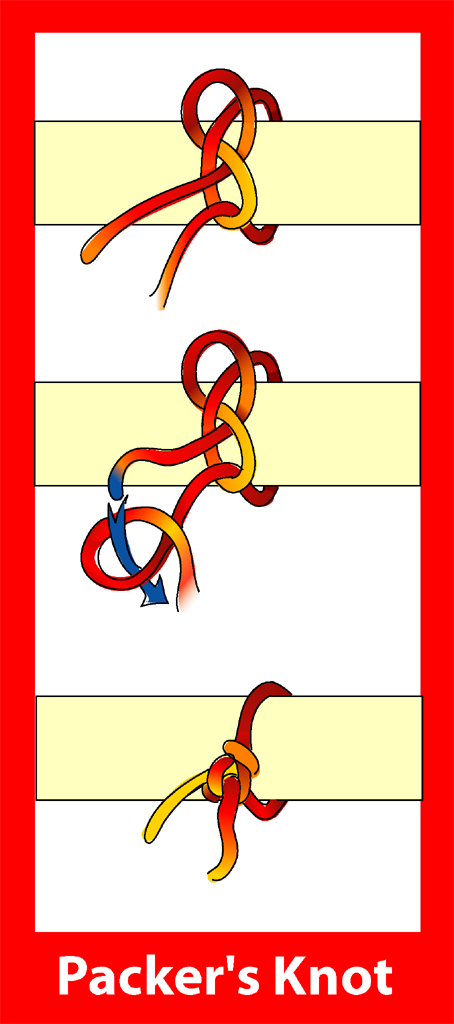
- Names: Packer's knot, Packing Knot
- Category: Binding
- Related: Corned beef knot, Butcher's knot
- Releasing: Jamming
- Typical use: Baling, parcel tying, butchery, cooking
- Caveat: Less secure than the corned beef knot
- ABoK: #187, #408, #2083

The packer's knot is a binding knot which is easily pulled taut and quickly locked in position. It is most often made in small line or string, such as that used for hand baling, parcel tying, and binding roasts. This latter use, and its general form, make it a member of a class of similar knots known as butcher's knots.

== Tying and variations ==
A lightly tightened figure-eight knot is formed around the standing part of the line such that both ends emerge from the same point. Pulling on the standing part tightens the binding. After the desired degree of tension is reached, a locking half-hitch is added over the working end and pulled taut.

Even without the locking half-hitch the knot will generally maintain tension while additional tying is accomplished, such as putting a second, perpendicular, wrap on a package.

A similar knot made with an overhand knot instead of a figure-eight works almost as well. Many other variations also exist finishing with this style of locking half-hitch. In fact, Clifford Ashley claimed that there were more knots of this type to be found than any other used for a single purpose.

== See also ==
- Corned beef knot
- List of binding knots
- List of knots
