= Corned beef knot =

Type of knot

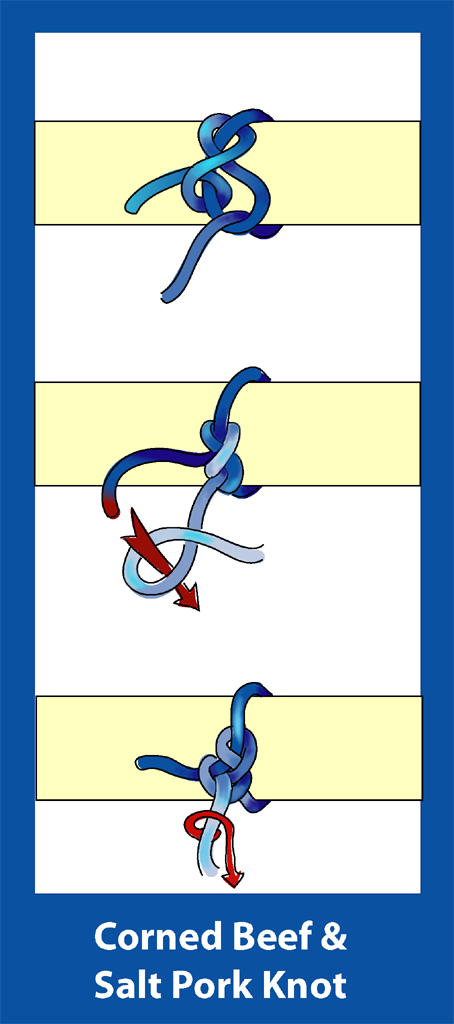
- Names: Corned beef knot, Salt pork knot
- Category: Binding
- Related: Packer's knot
- Releasing: Jamming
- Typical use: cooking, baling, parcel tying
- ABoK: #191
- Instructions

The corned beef knot is a binding knot usually made in small line or string. It gains its name by often being used for binding the meat of the same name while it is being cooked. Since corned beef shrinks during cooking, the knot needs to be tightened several times during the process.

== Tying ==
A buntline hitch is tied to the standing part and moderately tightened. The binding itself is tightened as the meat cooks by sliding the buntline hitch on the standing part. The knot is finished by a half hitch around the working end only after the meat has fully shrunk. It is considered more secure and suitable for this task than the related packer's knot.

== See also ==
- List of binding knots
- List of knots
