= Reever Knot =

Bend knot, joins two ropes

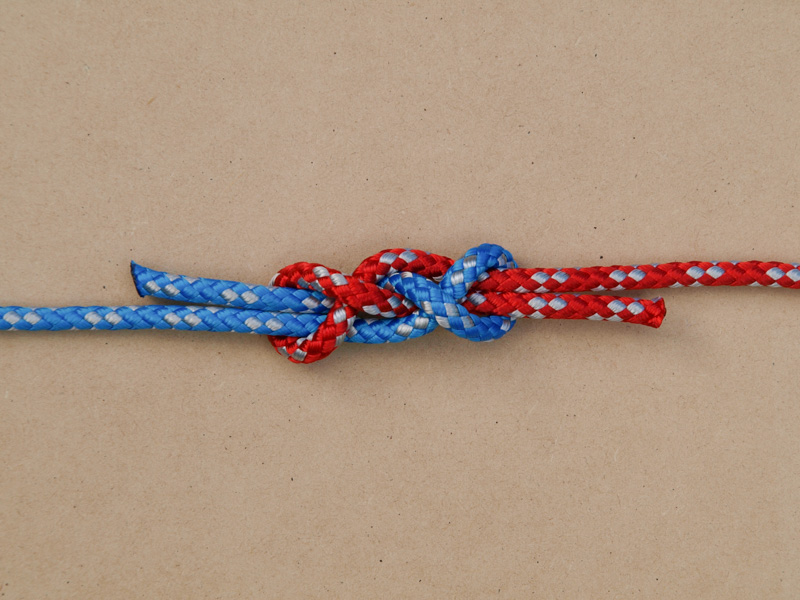
- Category: Bend
- Related: Vice Versa Bend, Simple Simon Over, Simple Simon Under, Double Harness Bend
- Releasing: Non-jamming

The Reever Knot is a secure bend for joining two ropes. An important attribute of the knot is that each line going in and out of the knot is clamped at two points within the knot. For this reason it is considered secure and resistant to being shaken loose when subject to intermittent loads.

== The Reever Knot and the Vice Versa Bend ==
The Reever Knot is closely related to the Vice Versa Bend. They only differ in the selection of which lines are used as the standing and working ends of the knot.

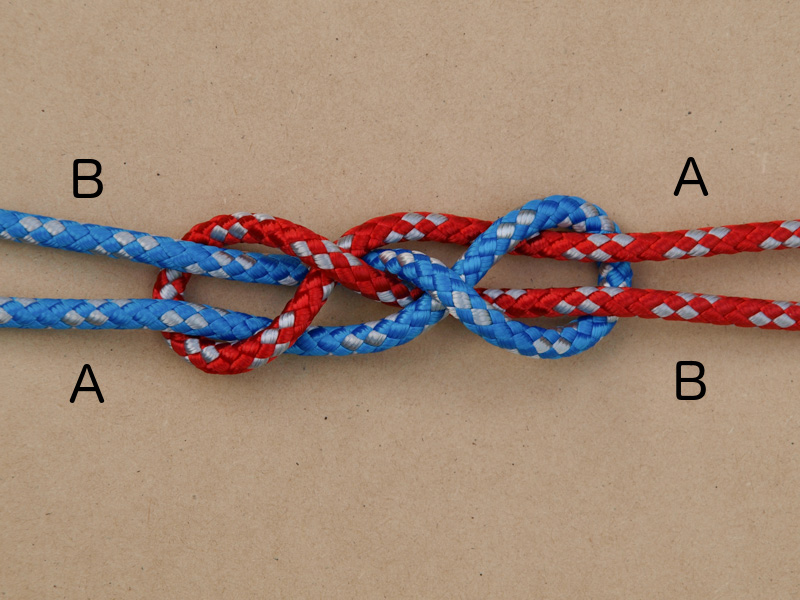

Given the structure of the knot there are three possible combinations one can use for the standing and working ends of the knot. The standing parts can be A-A, A-B, or B-B. The Reever knot results when the standing ends are selected as A-A. Selecting the standing ends as A-B results in the Vice Versa Bend.

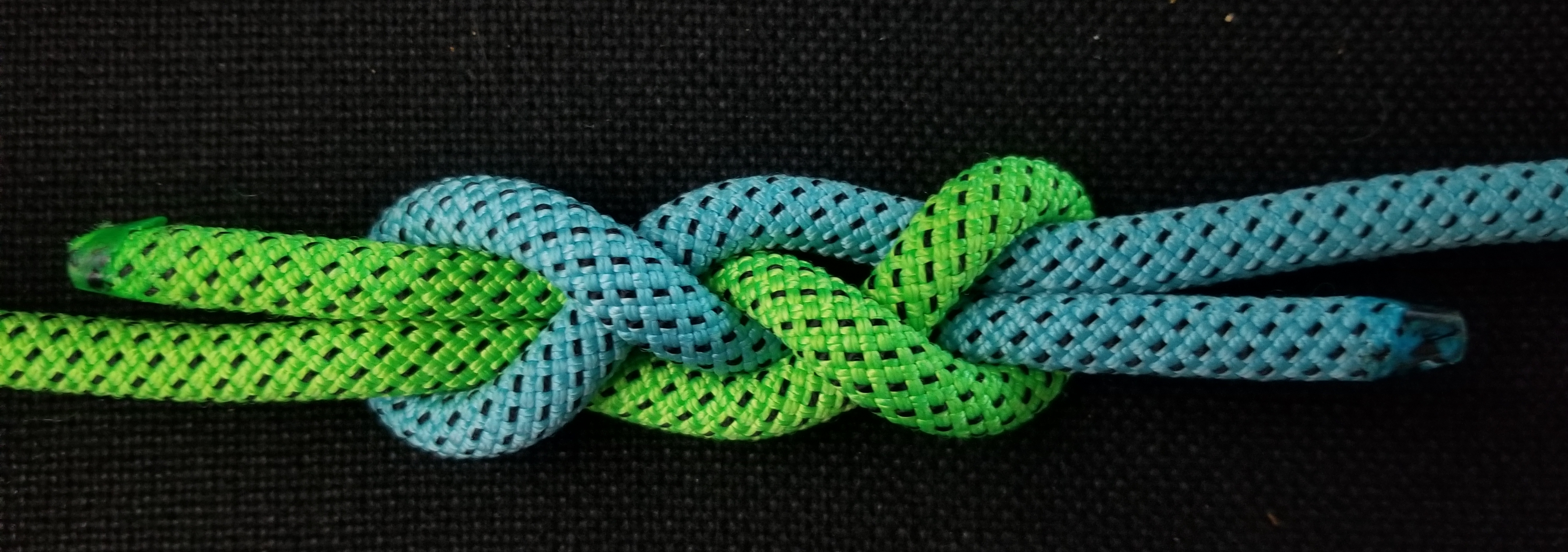
Reever knot: with standing ends A-A

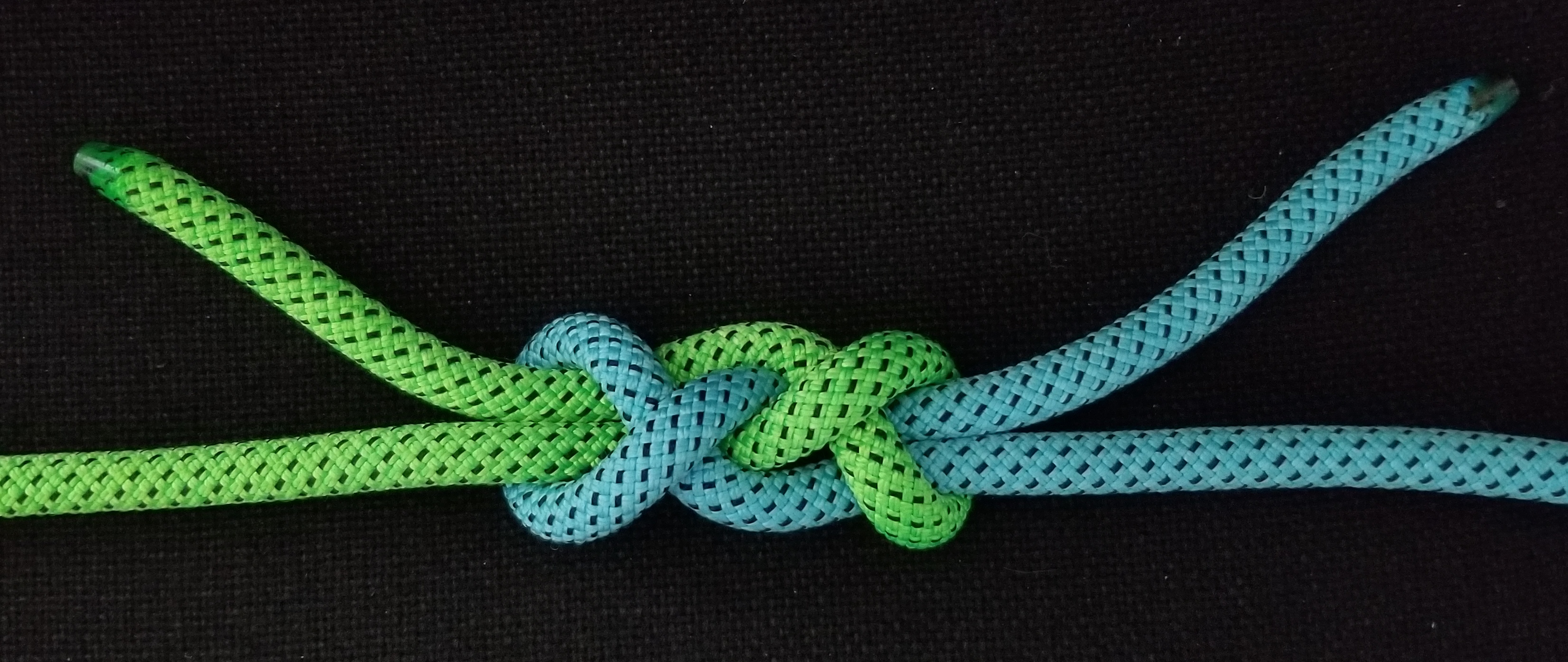
Vice Versa bend: with standing ends A-B

All forms of the knot are considered reliable and secure but it is suggested that the Reever Knot is the better version because the arrangement of standing and working ends in the Vice Versa Bend is not strictly symmetric.

== History ==
The Reever Knot appears in an article by C E I Wright and J E Magowan in volume 40 of the Alpine Journal in 1928 as a knot that is recommended for joining two ropes.

The Vice Versa Bend appears in The Alternative Knot Book by Harry Asher (1989). In the introduction to his 'New System of Knots' he presents a sequence of three new knots, the Simple Simon Over, the Simple Simon Under, and the Vice Versa Bend. The three knots form a developmental sequence that were inspired by aspects of the Sheet bend.

In his 1995 book, Symmetric Bends: How to Join Two Lengths of Cord, Miles presents a knot theoretic analysis of 60 symmetric bends. The Vice Versa Bend appears as number 19 in this sequence. Miles attributes the knot to Asher and describes it as a 'pure lanyard bend' in which "two ends of equal status emerge from the knot in each of two opposite directions".

Budworth, a founding member of the International Guild of Knot Tyers, includes the Vice Versa Bend in his 2000 book The Book of Practical Knots. He also attributes the knot to Asher.

The relationship between the Reever Knot and the Vice Versa Bend was first pointed out by Clements In his 2004 article "The Vice Versa Bend and the Reever Knot". His analysis of the symmetry of the two forms of the knot led him to suggest that the Reever Knot, being completely symmetric, is the better version of the knot. He concludes that the Reever knot is a secure bend that is compact and streamlined in form, and that it deserves to be more widely known and used.

== Tying sequence ==
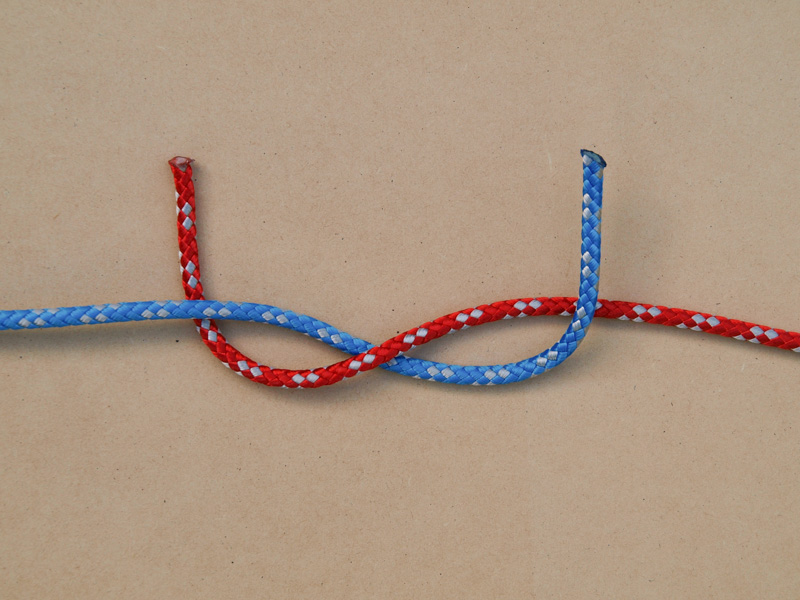

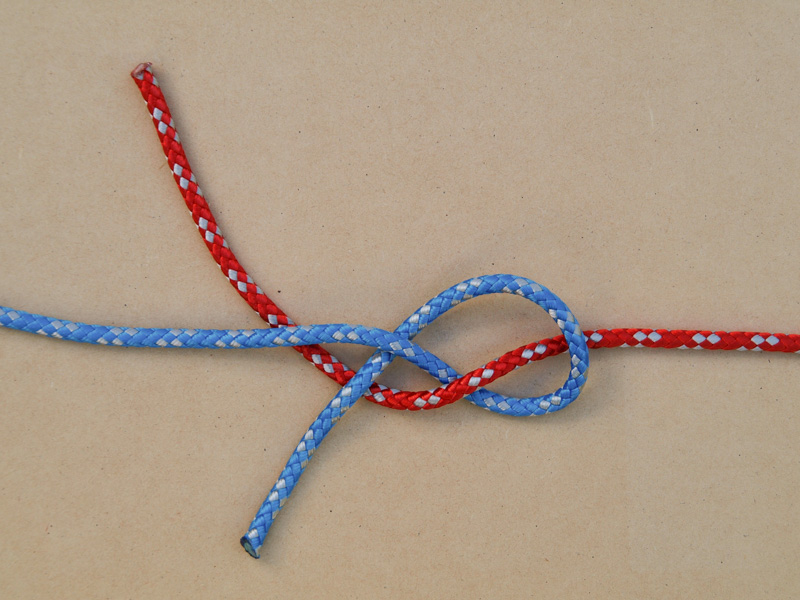

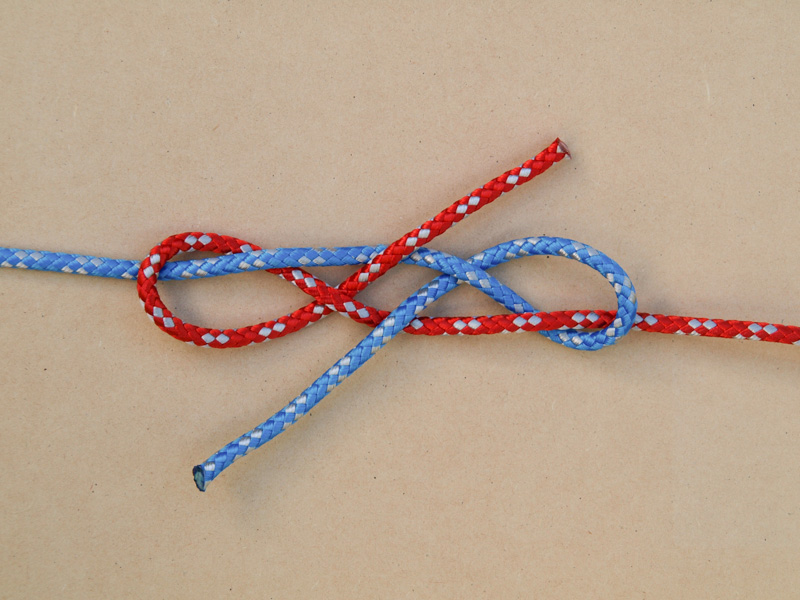

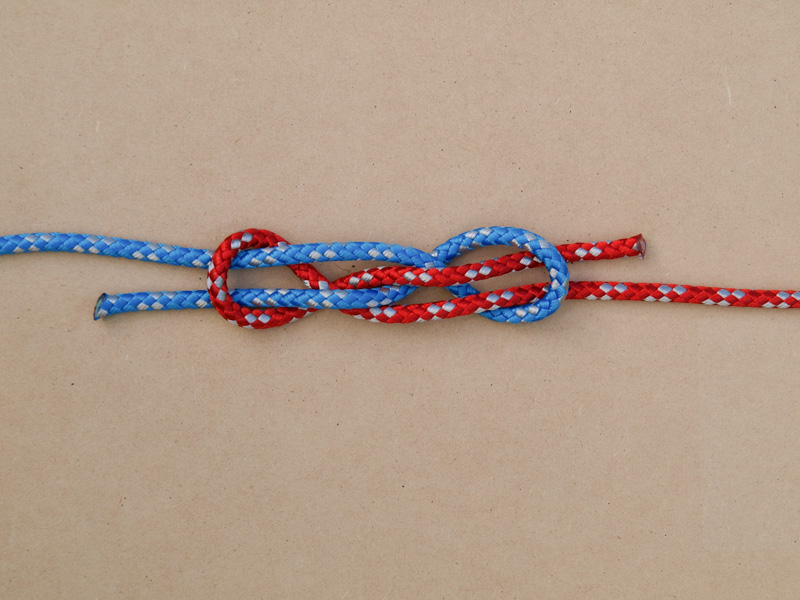

== Use ==
The knot provides a compact, streamlined and decorative way of joining two ropes. However its primary attribute is that it is resistant against working loose when subject to intermittent loads. The security of the knot arises from the fact that at step 3 in the tying sequence the knot is a Double Harness Bend with parallel ends (ABoK #1421). The additional step of passing the ends through the outer loops to complete the knot results in each line entering and exiting the knot being clamped at two points within the knot.

== See also ==
- List of knots
