= Two half-hitches =

Type of knot

- Category: Hitch
- Origin: Ancient
- Related: Round turn and two half-hitches, Buntline hitch, Clove hitch, Taut-line hitch, Half hitch
- Releasing: Binding
- Typical use: General-purpose hitch
- Caveat: low security
- ABoK: #1710 #1781

Two half-hitches is a type of knot, specifically a binding knot or hitch knot. One variety consists of an overhand knot tied around a post, followed by a half-hitch. This knot is less often referred to as a clove hitch over itself, double half-hitch, or full-hitch.

Two half hitches is the commonest of all hitches for mooring in particular and also for general utility. Steel gives the name in 1794. The difference between two half hitches and the clove hitch is that the former, after a single turn around a spar, is made fast around its own standing part, while the latter is tied directly around the spar.

— The Ashley Book of Knots

The following three-step process for tying the two half-hitches is also explained in the image gallery below. Click on the images for high-resolution versions.

1. Begin by forming a clockwise loop around the pole, with the working end of the rope on top. Bring the working end through the loop. At this point, you have an overhand knot around the pole.
2. Bring the working end down and to the left. Loop it under the standing end. Pull the working end through the loop just formed, tighten, and slide the knot along the standing end up to the post.
3. A correctly tied two half-hitches resembles a clove hitch tied around the standing end of the line, not a cow hitch.
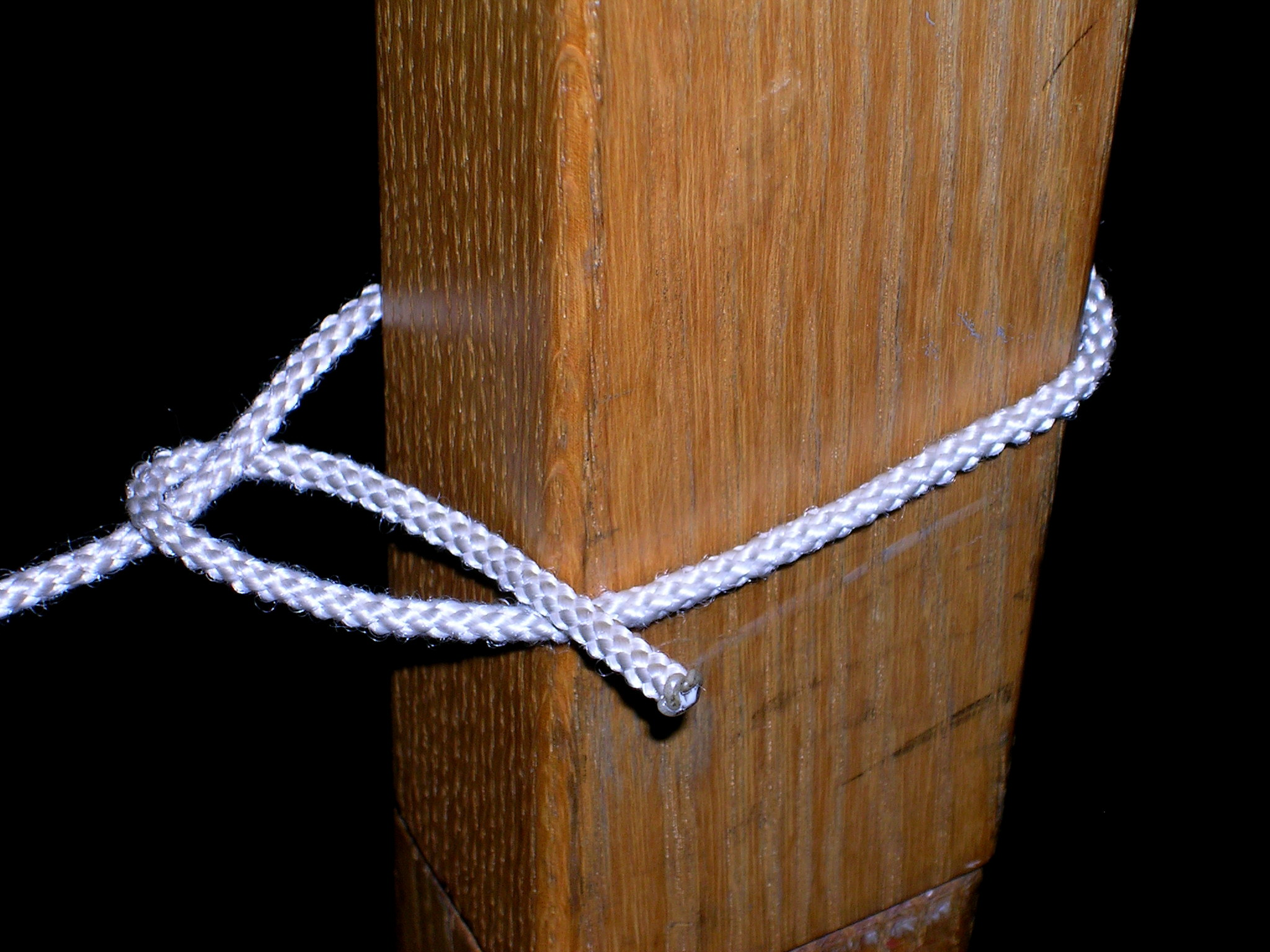
Step 1: Form a single half-hitch, or overhand knot

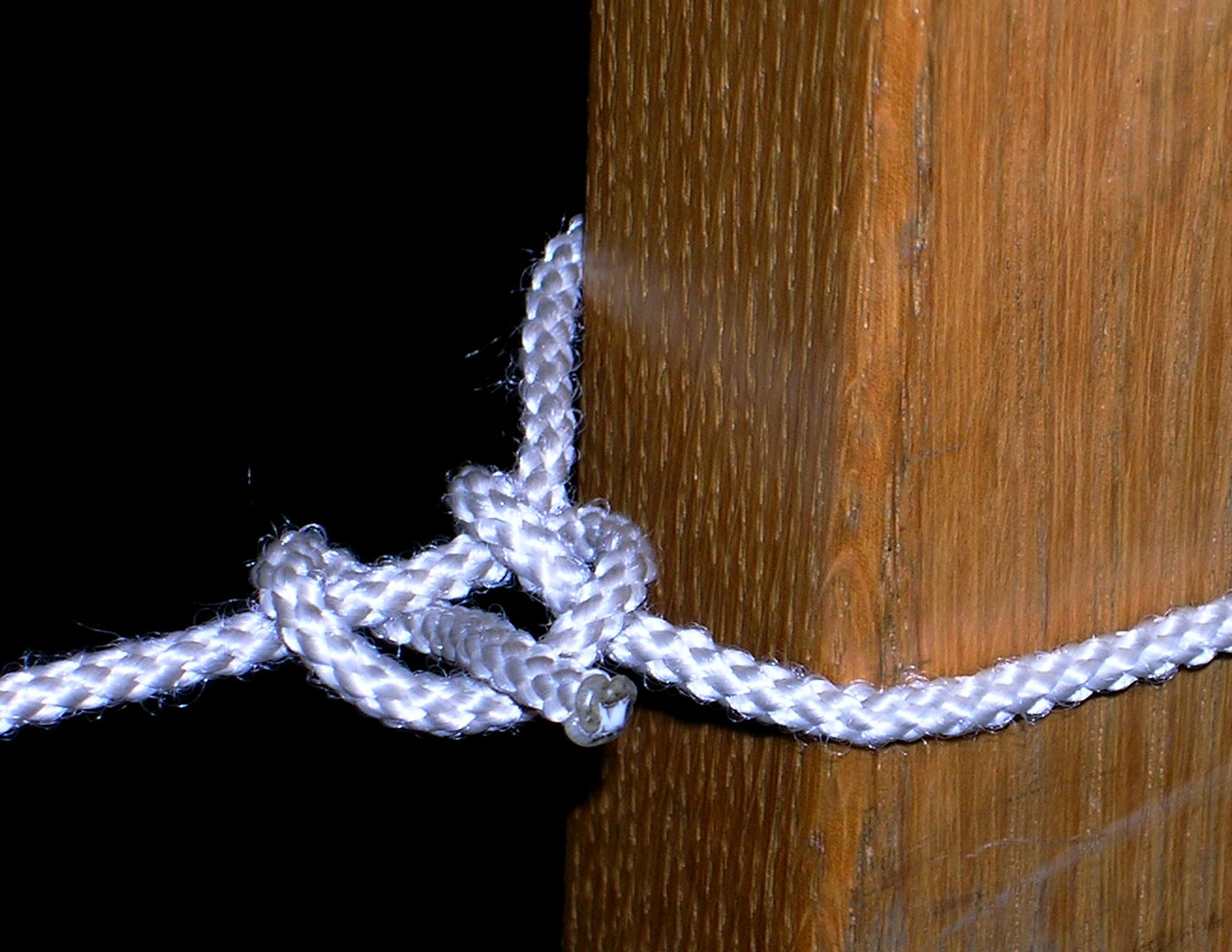
Step 2: Form a second half-hitch above the first

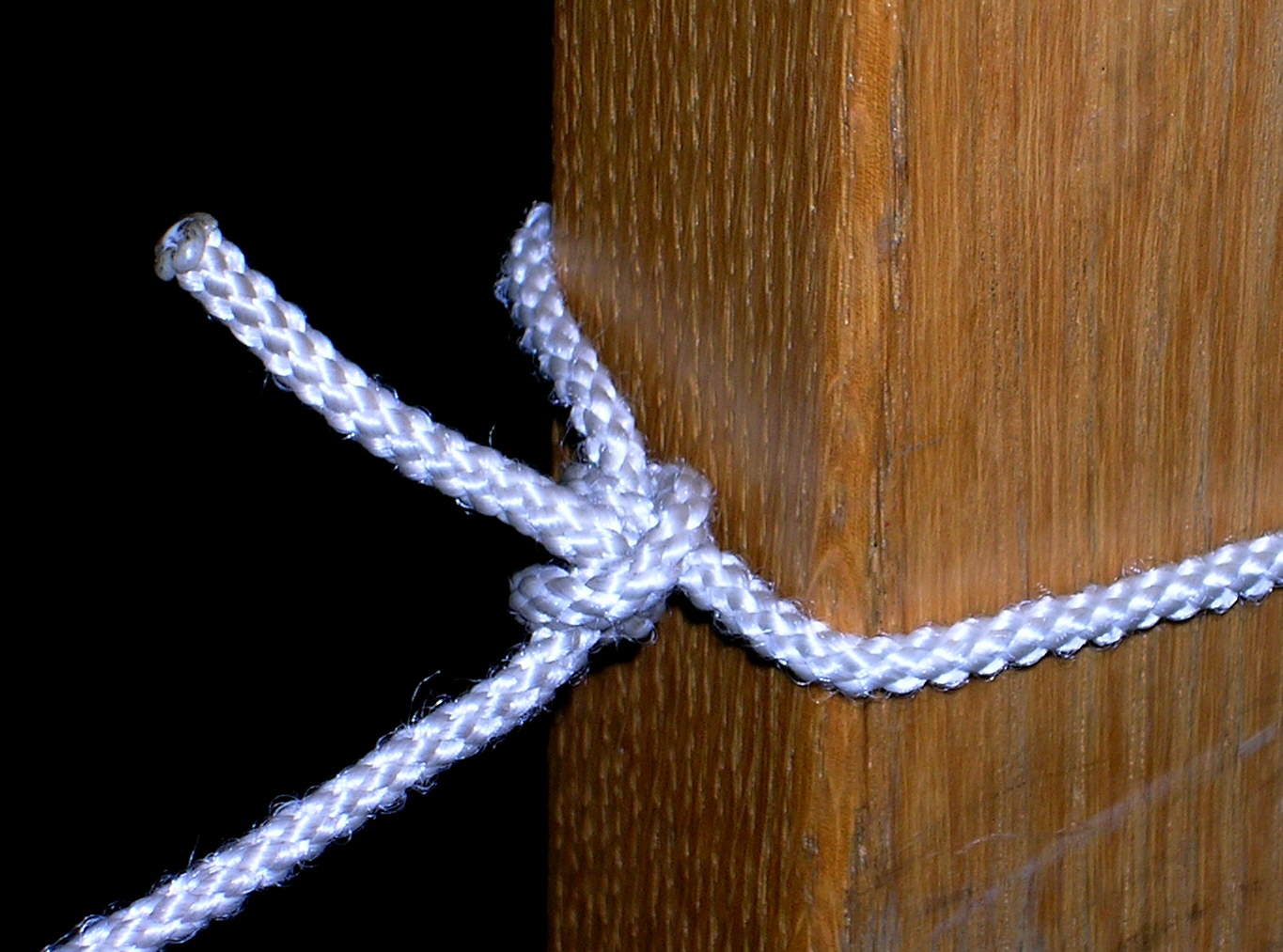
Step 3: Tighten

To release the knot, pry apart the two hitches with a bending motion. However, it can often be difficult to untie. To help avoid this problem, tie a slipped variation: in the second half-hitch, pass through a bight, as when tying your shoe, rather than the entire free end.

The buntline hitch, when bent to a yard, makes a more secure knot than two half hitches, but is more liable to jam. It differs from two half hitches in that the second half hitch is inside instead of outside the first one.

— The Ashley Book of Knots

Ashley Lesson #1781 has quotations on using two half-hitches for safety:

- "Two half hitches will never slip"—Admiral Luce.
- "Two half hitches saved a Queen's Ship"—Anonymous.
- "Three half hitches are more than a King's Yacht wants"—Admiral Smyth.

== See also ==
- List of hitch knots
- List of knots
