= Killick hitch =

Type of hitch

- Names: Killick hitch, Kelleg hitch, Timber Hitch and a Half Hitch
- Category: Hitch
- Related: Timber hitch
- Typical use: Attach a rope to an oddly shaped object.
- ABoK: #271, #1733, #2162

The killick hitch /ˈkɪlɪk/ is a type of hitch knot used to attach a rope to oddly shaped objects. It is a combination of a timber hitch tied in conjunction with a half hitch which is added to lend support and stability when pulling or hoisting the object.

A killick is "a small anchor or weight for mooring a boat, sometimes consisting of a stone secured by pieces of wood".

== Use ==
The killick hitch is used to anchor small boats, usually by using some odd shaped heavy object. It is used by oystermen because the anchor is more readily moved than with other methods.

== See also ==
- List of knots
- List of hitch knots
