= Timber hitch =

Type of knot

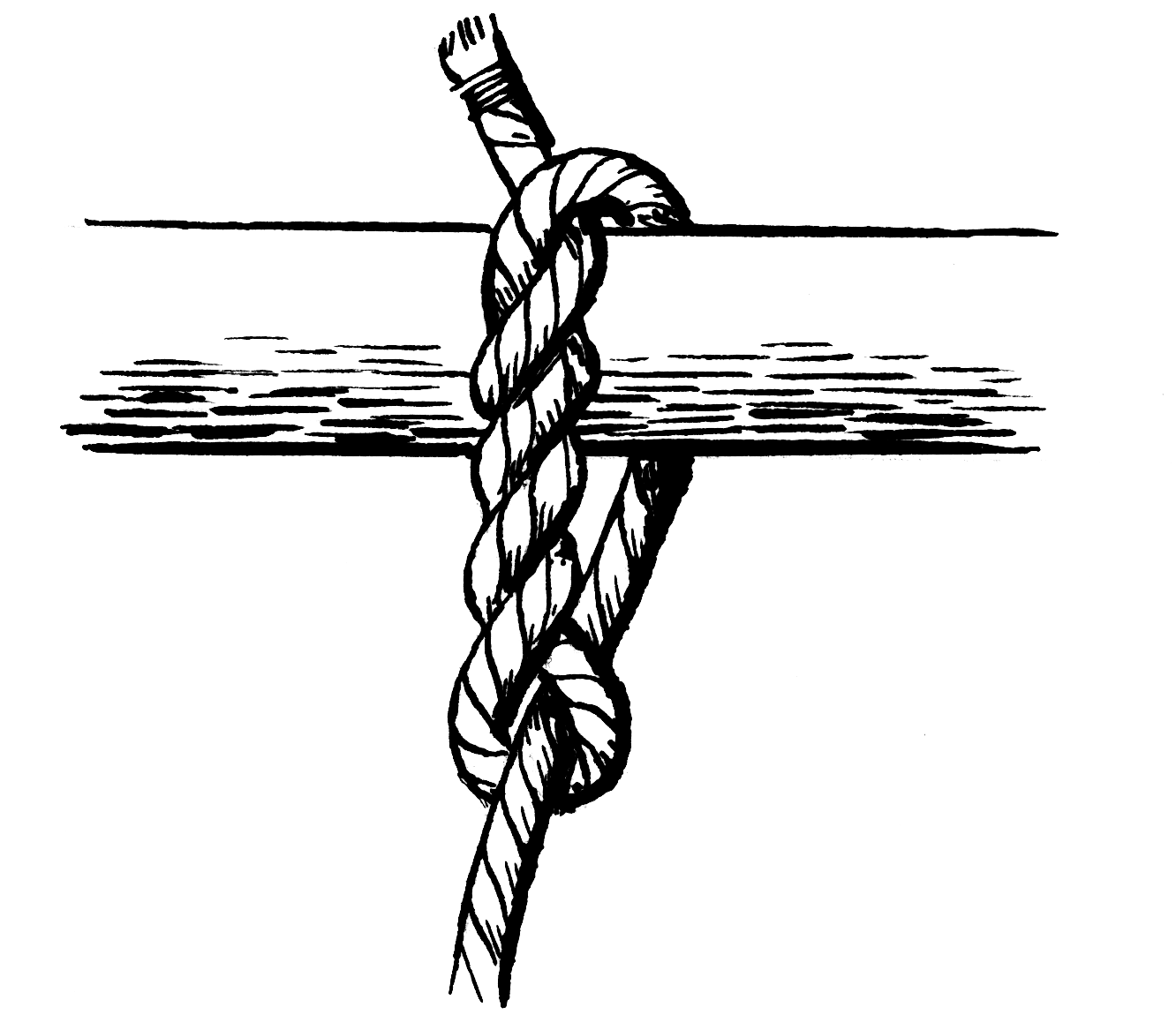
- Names: Timber hitch, Fig.8 Timber Hitch, Bowyer's Knot, Lumberman's Knot, Countryman's Knot
- Category: Hitch
- Related: Killick hitch
- Releasing: Non-jamming
- ABoK: #1668,#195, #479, #1665, #2161
- Instructions

The timber hitch is a knot used to attach a single length of rope to a cylindrical object. Secure while tension is maintained, it is easily untied even after heavy loading.

The timber hitch is a very old knot. It is first known to have been mentioned in a nautical source c. 1625 and illustrated in 1762.

== Usage ==
As the name suggests, this knot is often used by lumbermen and arborists for attaching ropes or chains to tree trunks, branches, and logs. For stability when towing or lowering long items, the addition of a half-hitch in front of the timber hitch creates a timber hitch and a half hitch, or known as a killick hitch when at sea. A killick is "a small anchor or weight for mooring a boat, sometimes consisting of a stone secured by pieces of wood". This can also prevent the timber hitch from rolling. The timber hitch is one of the few knots that can easily be tied in a chain, leading to its use in applications where ropes lack the necessary strength and would break under the same amount of tension.

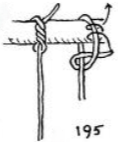

The Timber Hitch is very convenient for hoisting boards and timbers, as it cannot jam and may be instantly loosened. If timber is to be hoisted on end the Timber Hitch is made with the end of the rope below the center of the timber and then a Half Hitch is added in the standing part at the upper end of the timber.

— Clifford W. Ashley, The Ashley Book of Knots, Entry 195.

This knot is also known as the Bowyer's Knot, as it is used to attach the lower end of the bowstring to the bottom limb on an English longbow.

The hitch is also one of the methods used to connect ukulele and classical guitar strings to the bridge of the instruments.

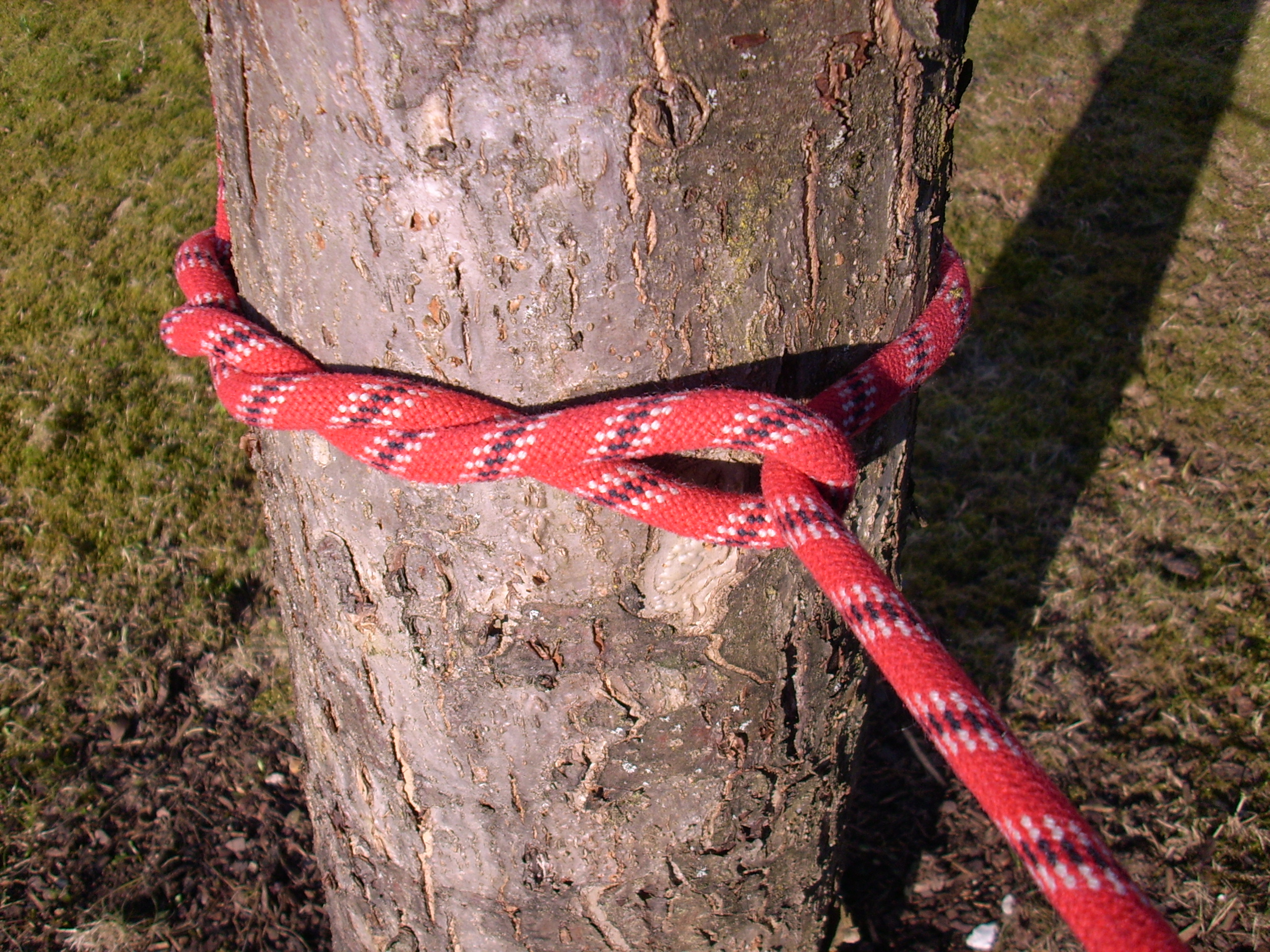
Timber hitch on a tree trunk.

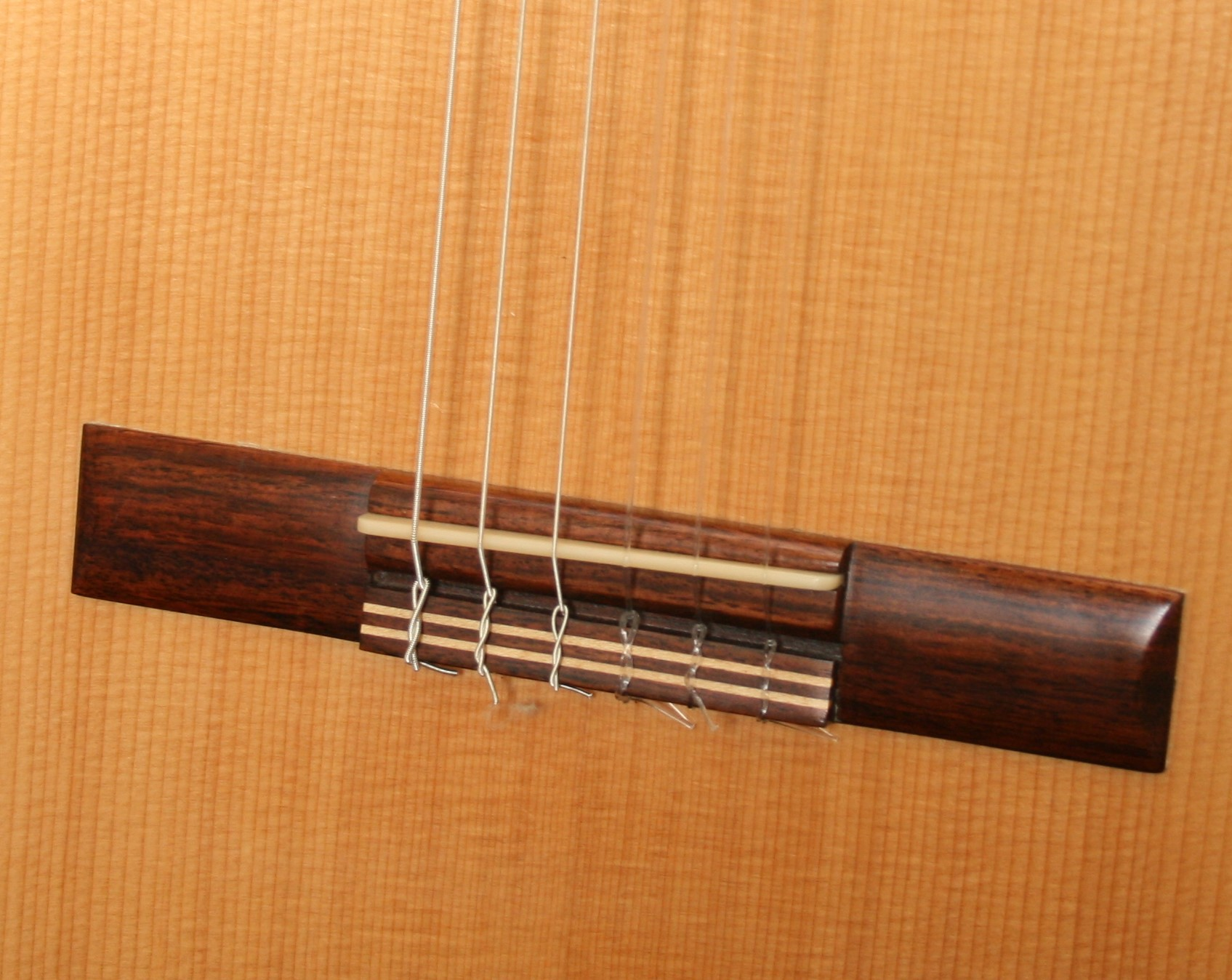
Timber hitches on the bridge of a classical guitar

== Tying ==
To make the knot, pass the rope completely around the object. Pass the running end around the standing part, then through the loop just formed. Make three or more turns (or twists) around the working part. Pull on the standing part to tighten around the object.

A common error in tying can be avoided by assuring that the turns are made in the working part around itself. When making the hitch in laid rope, the turns should be made with the lay of the rope, that is, in the same direction as the twist of the rope.

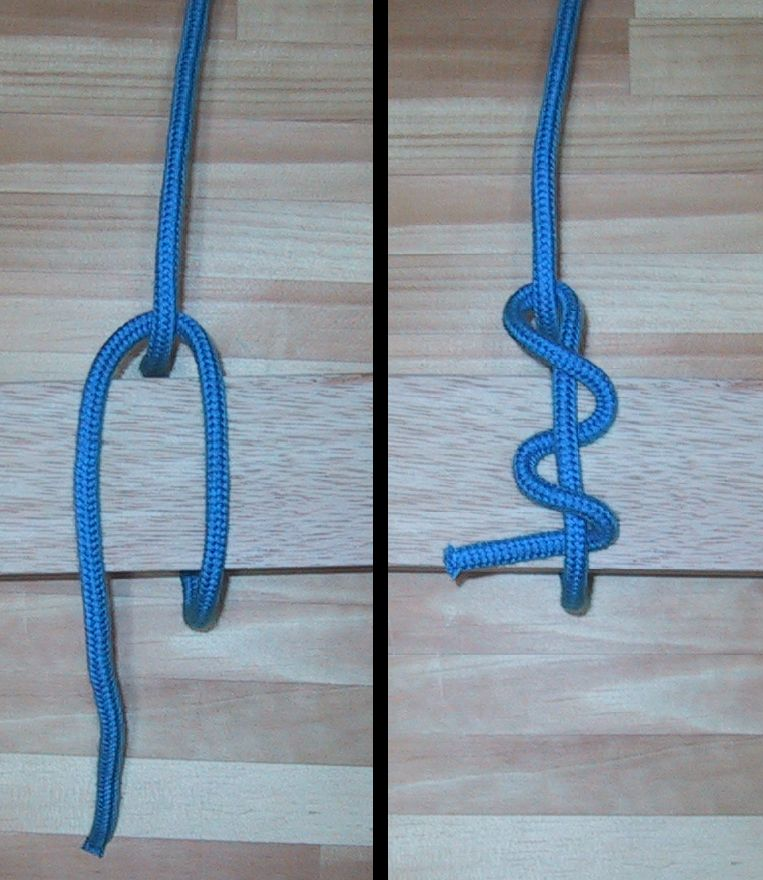
Timber hitch step by step. Three turns are shown.

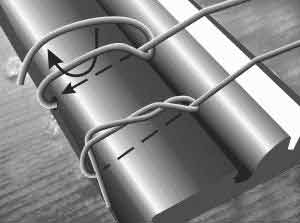
Tying technique for stringed instruments

== Security ==
Although The Ashley Book of Knots states that "three tucks or turns are ample", this work was written prior to the wide use of synthetic fiber cordage. Later sources suggest five or more turns may be required for full security in modern synthetic ropes.

== ABoK Context ==
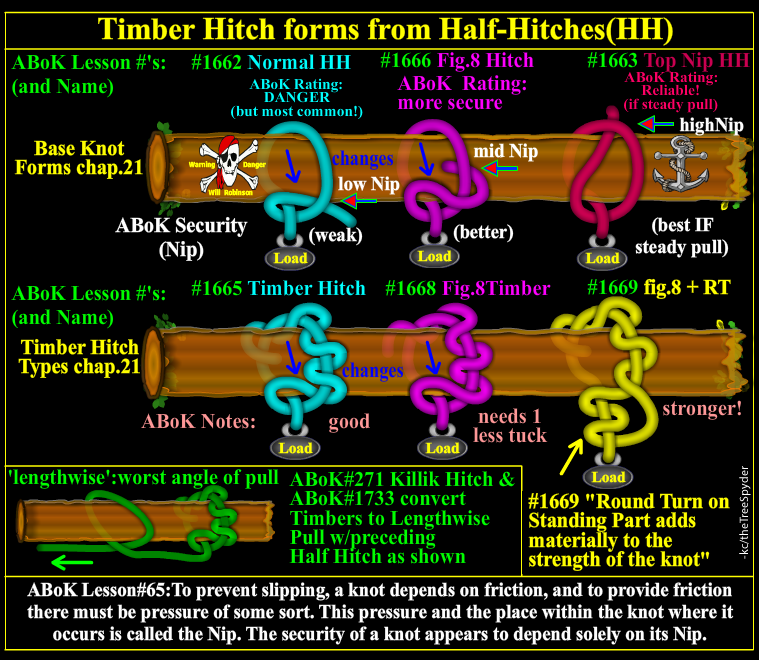
Comparison of 3 types of Half Hitches, and then Timber Hitches, including Killik conversion for errant angle of pull.

The Timber Hitches list almost immediately in "CHAPTER 21: HITCHES TO SPAR AND RAIL (RIGHT-ANGLE PULL)", only preceded there by 3 Half Hitch base forms. The context begins with typical Half Hitch#1662 as worst security/nip warnings warning with Skull/Crossbones, but a base structure to build on. Then shows the most security at top nip/opposing the linear load pull position as a safer Half Hitch form#1663 awarding Anchor icon if constant pull. Then introduces Timber Hitch #1665 concept from extension of worst nip Half Hitch tail#1662 . #1666 then shows Fig.8 concept as upgrade to Half Hitch#1662 and shows the nip position pushed to halfway between normal and top nip Half Hitch. Also adds a geometric consideration of:"particularly if the encompassed object is small." of even higher nip. #1668 then shows the Fig.8 Timber Hitch with nip more to side and not bottom as improvement.

Next trick is in #1669 Fig.8 Hitch with Round Turn. Where the Round Turn is around the Standing Part and Fig.8 portion actually pictured as fig.8 Timber Hitch and so adds that the "Round Turn on the Standing Part adds materially to the strength of the knot."

Next chapter is "CHAPTER 22: HITCHES TO MASTS, RIGGING, AND CABLE (LENGTHWISE PULL) To withstand a lengthwise pull without slipping is about the most that can be asked of a hitch. Great care must be exercised in tying the following series of knots, and the impossible must not be expected" that starts off with a Timber Hitch preceded by 'lengthwise' Half Hitch form to convert Timber from "RIGHT-ANGLE PULL" to "LENGTHWISE PULL" usage in the back to back chapters.

== See also ==
- List of knots
- Killick hitch
