= Buntline hitch =

Type of knot

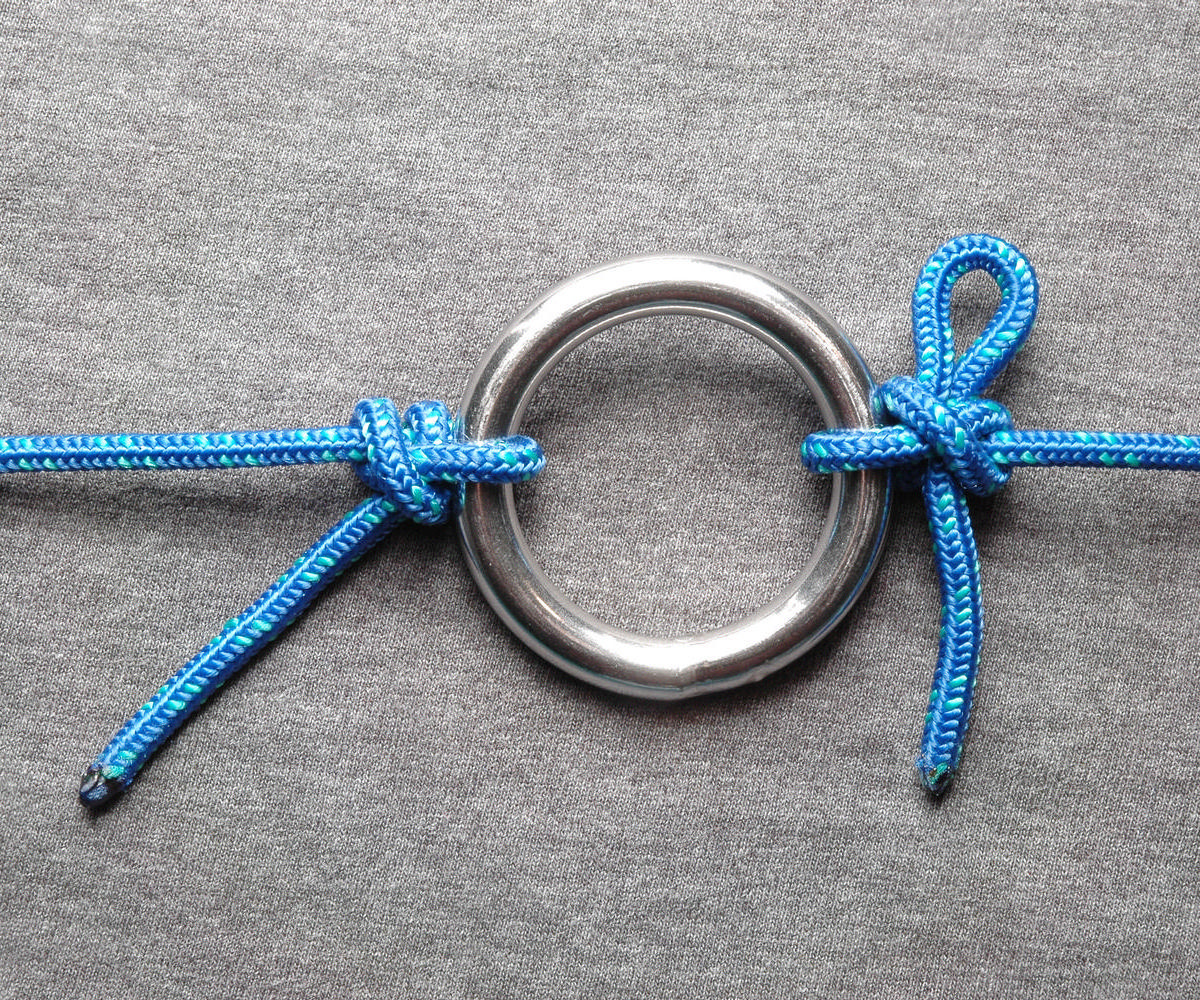
- Left: Buntline hitch Right: Slipped buntline hitch
- Names: Buntline hitch, Stunsail tack bend, Studding sail tack bend, Inside clove hitch
- Category: Hitch
- Related: Clove hitch, Two half-hitches, Lobster buoy hitch, Corned beef knot
- Releasing: Jamming
- ABoK: #55, #397, #1229, #1711, #1712, #1807, #1838, #1847, #1918, #2408

The buntline hitch is a knot used for attaching a rope to an object. It is formed by passing the working end around an object, then making a clove hitch around the rope's standing part and taking care that the turns of the clove hitch progress towards the object rather than away from it. Secure and easily tied, the buntline hitch will jam when subjected to extreme loads. Given the knot's propensity to jam, it is often made in slipped form.

The buntline hitch, when bent to a yard, makes a more secure knot than two half hitches, but is more liable to jam. It differs from two half hitches in that the second half hitch is inside instead of outside the first one.

— The Ashley Book of Knots

== History ==
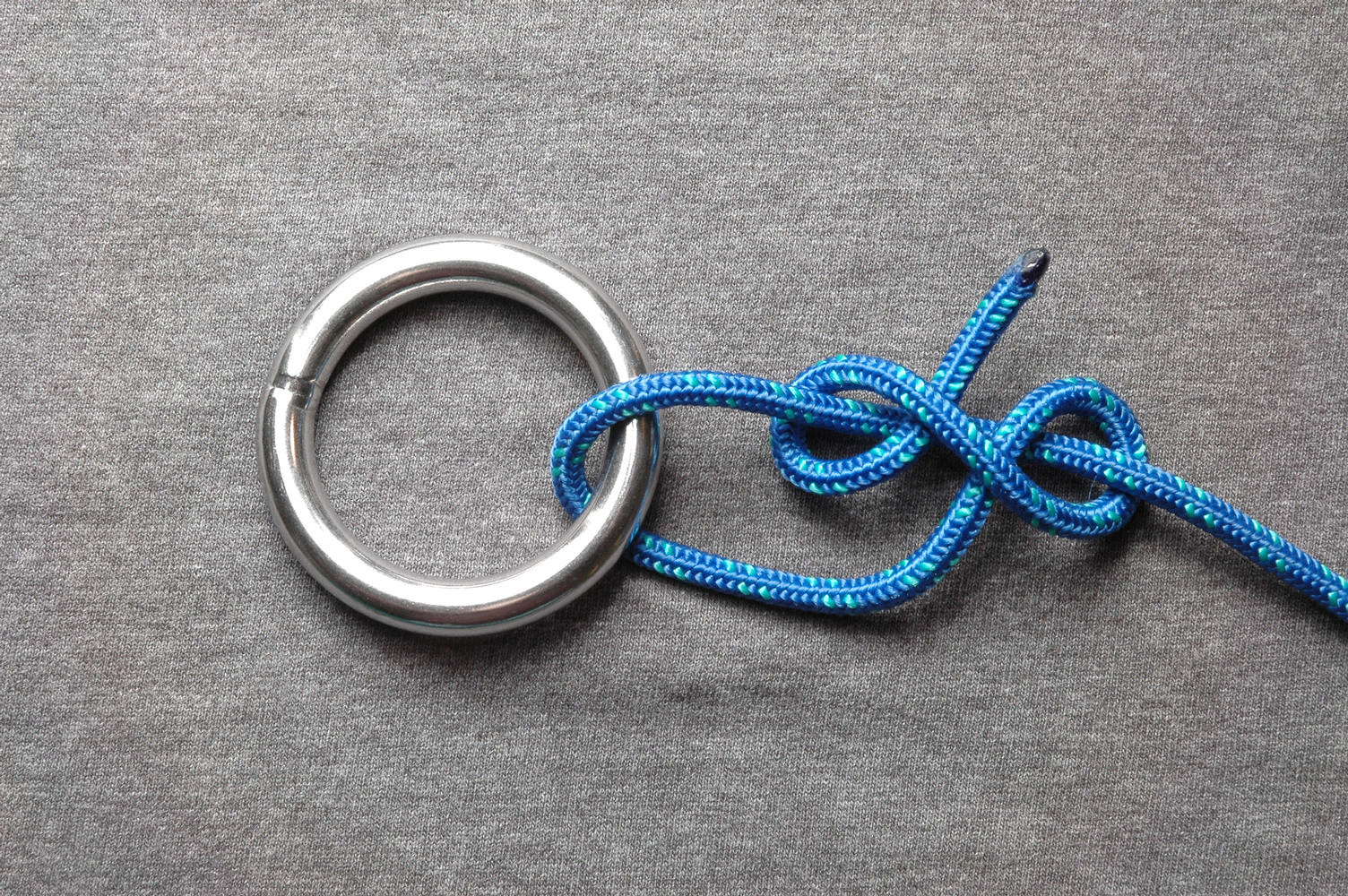
Untightened buntline hitch

Simple and effective, the buntline hitch dates to the Age of Sail, when it was used to secure buntlines to the foot of the sails on square-rigged ships. That the buntline hitch was the preferred knot speaks to its security and reliability. Once set, repeated jerking and slatting tend to tighten it further rather than loosen it. Its compact size allowed the foot of the sail to be drawn up as closely as possible to the buntline deadeyes on top of the yard.

It has gained in popularity in recent years due to its performance in slippery modern synthetic lines.

== Usage ==
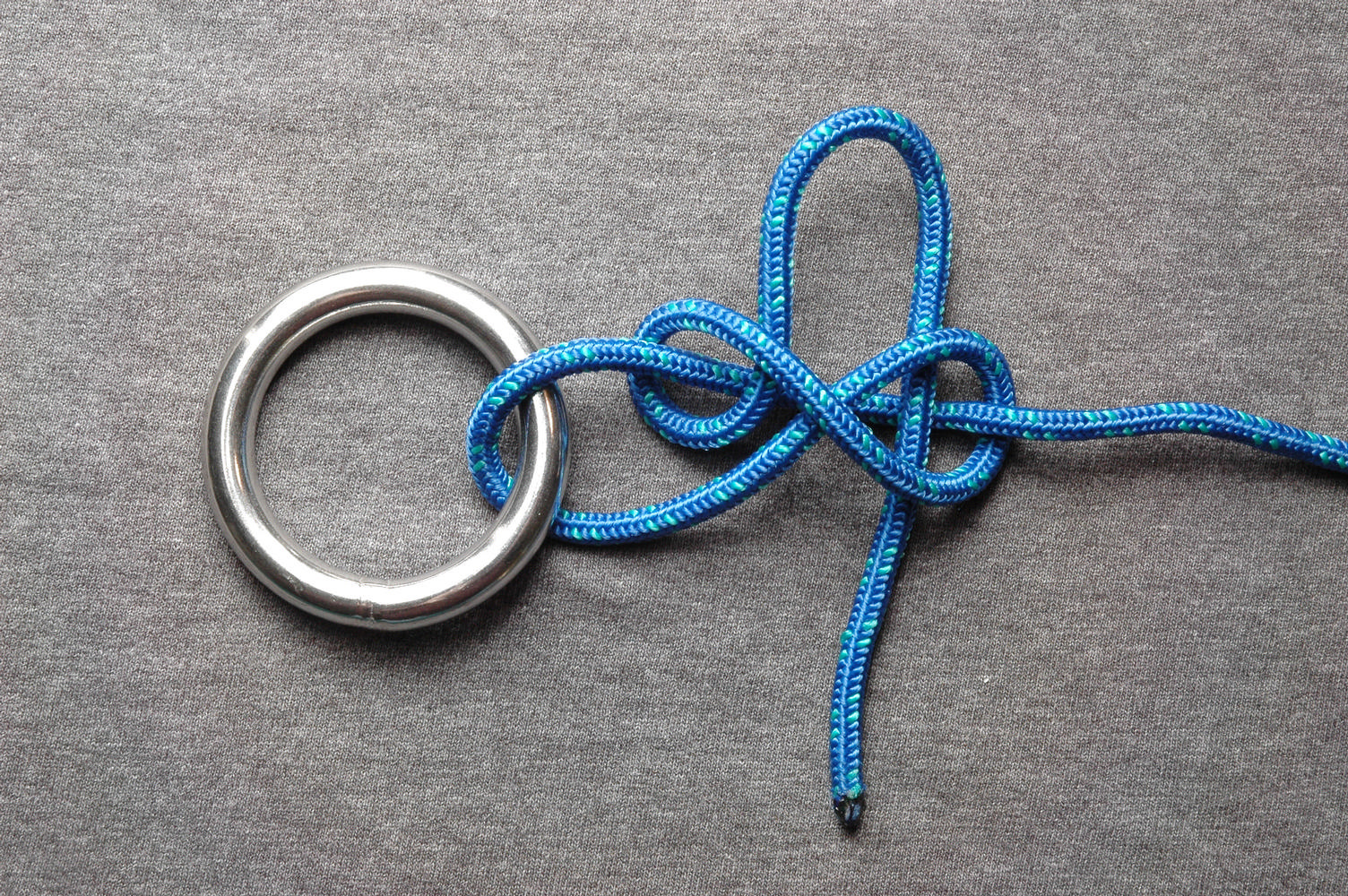
Untightened slipped buntline hitch

The buntline hitch is useful for attaching lines to rings, eyes, posts, rods, and railings where a compact and secure knot is required. The non-slipped form is appropriate for moderate loads or where the knot will not need to be untied often. If heavily loaded it can be difficult or impossible to untie without the aid of a marlinspike.

The slipped form is more versatile and convenient when a secure temporary hitch is needed. For example, the slipped buntline hitch is an excellent choice to fasten a line to one side of a vehicle's luggage rack, with a trucker's hitch being used on the other side to tension the line over a load placed between them.

The buntline hitch is the same knot as the four-in-hand knot used for neckties. When it is made in flat material in the manner used to fasten a necktie, the working end is brought more parallel to the standing part during tightening than generally seen when made in cylindrical cordage for load-bearing purposes.

== Tying ==
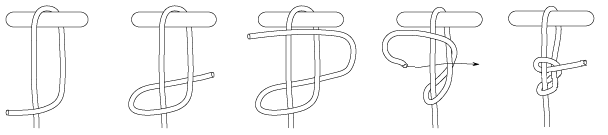

The buntline hitch is simply a clove hitch tied around the standing part, with the turns of the clove hitch progressing towards the object.

=== Slipped variation ===

The slipped variation is made by passing a bight through on the final step instead of the end. The knot may be released by pulling at the free end of the rope.

== Security ==
While the buntline hitch is considered a secure knot, the turns of the clove hitch must progress towards the object, otherwise the much less secure two half-hitches will result.

Although not generally required, a round turn can first be made around the object causing the buntline hitch to be even less prone to slipping.

A buntline hitch may also be tied with an extra half turn for security: see highpoint hitch.

== See also ==
- List of hitch knots
