= Lapp knot =

Knot

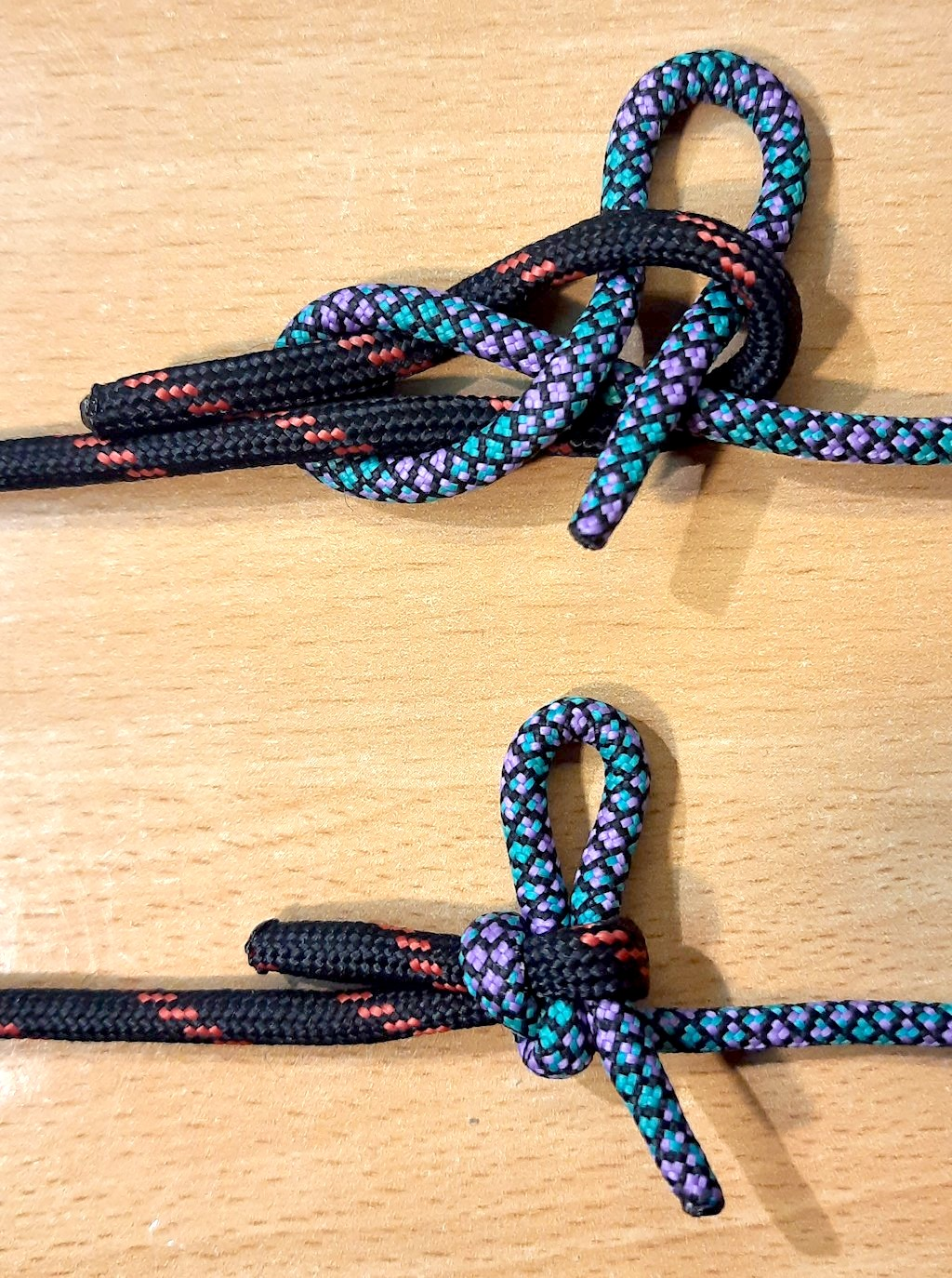
- Names: Lapp knot, Lap knot, Lap bend, Lapp bend, quick hitch
- Category: Bend
- Category 2: Loop
- Origin: Ancient
- Related: sheet bend, bowline, cowboy bowline, Eskimo bowline
- Releasing: Non-jamming
- Typical use: Joining two lines, loop, binding knot
- ABoK: #1224

The Lapp knot is a type of bend. It has the same structure as the sheet bend, but the opposite ends are loaded. The slipped Lapp bend (among arbourists known as quick hitch) is also an exploding knot, which means that when pulling the quick release end it falls completely apart without further entanglement. It is as strong as or even stronger than the sheet bend, though much less common.

The Lapp knot is closely related to the sheet bend, the bowline and the Eskimo bowline. They all share the same core structure, but differ in how the four ends are loaded. The Lapp knot was sometimes called 'false sheet bend', which might explain its low popularity.

== Lapp bend ==
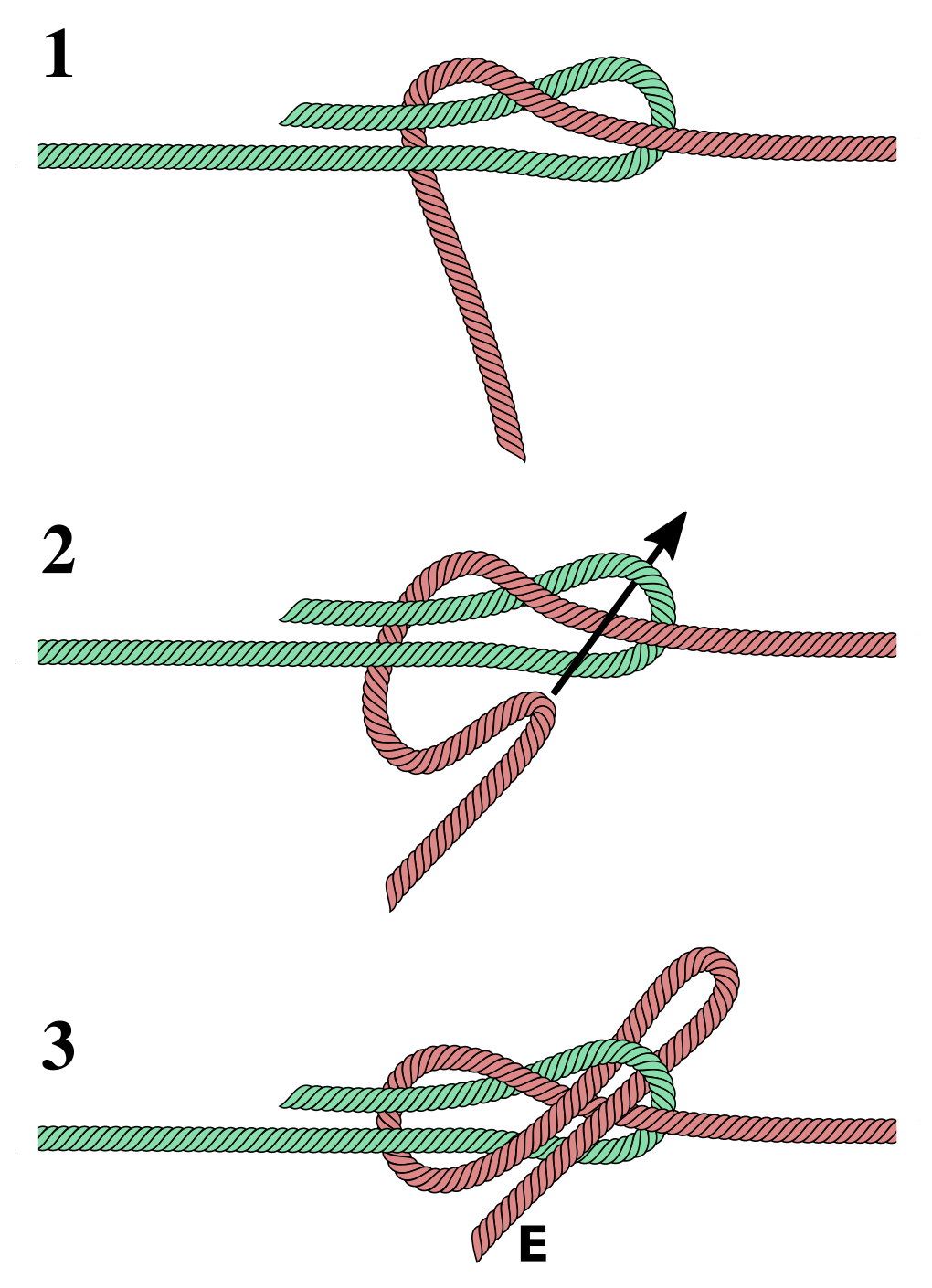
Steps to tie a (slipped) Lapp bend.

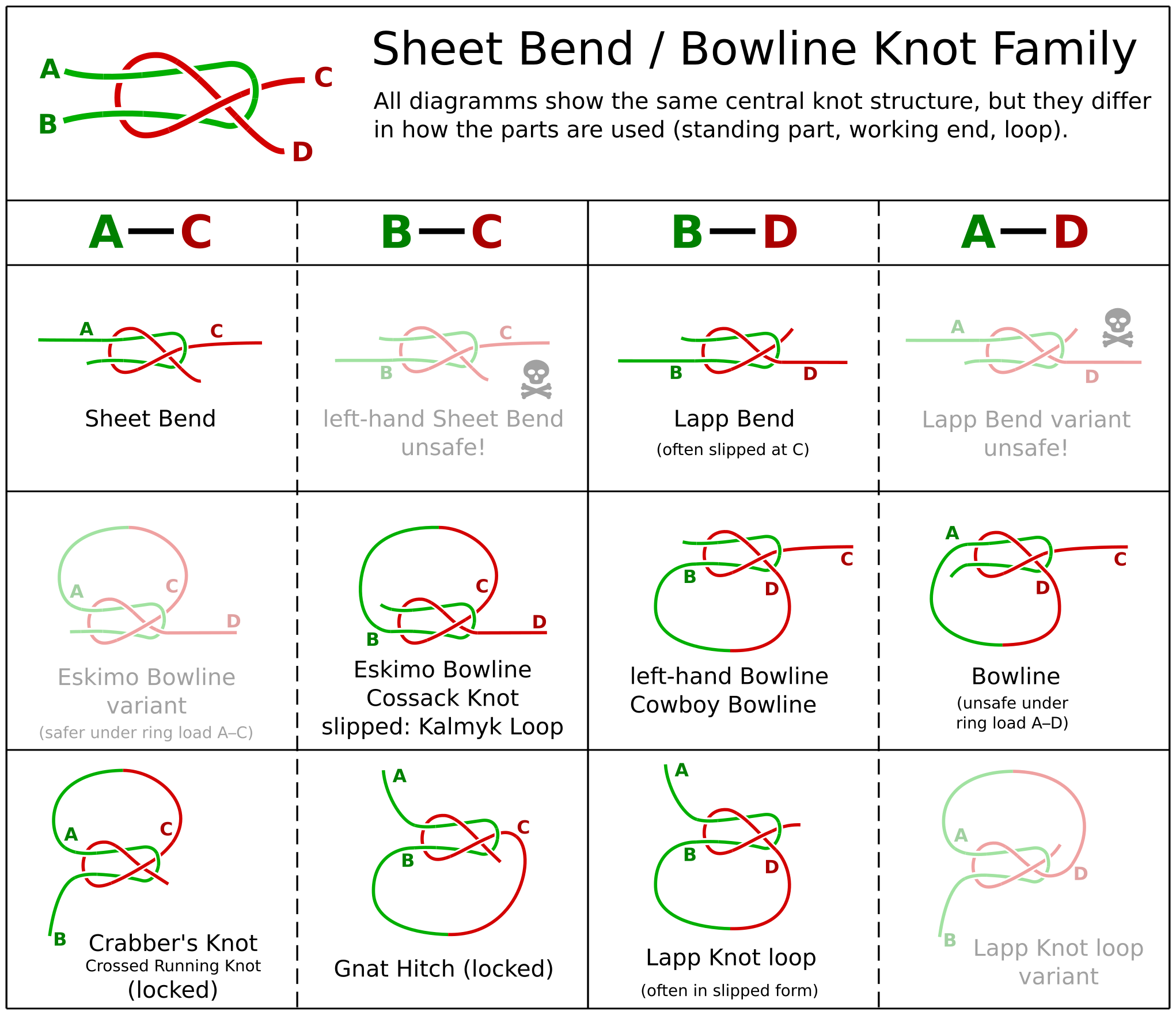
Bends and loops directly related to the sheet bend and bowline

A way to tie the knot is shown in the image to the left. The orientation of the green bight is important: Its working end should end up on the same side as the red lines slip bight, or as the red working end when tying the non-slip version (A & C). If they end up on opposite sides (B & C), the resulting knot is much weaker and tends to slip, because then the two standing parts lose some of their binding force due to mutual friction before they can clamp down the loose ends. (The same is true for the bowline.)

The non-slipped Lapp bend (like the bowline) does not jam and can be untied easily even after being loaded. The slipped version unties even easier with a firm tug on the end E (quick release).

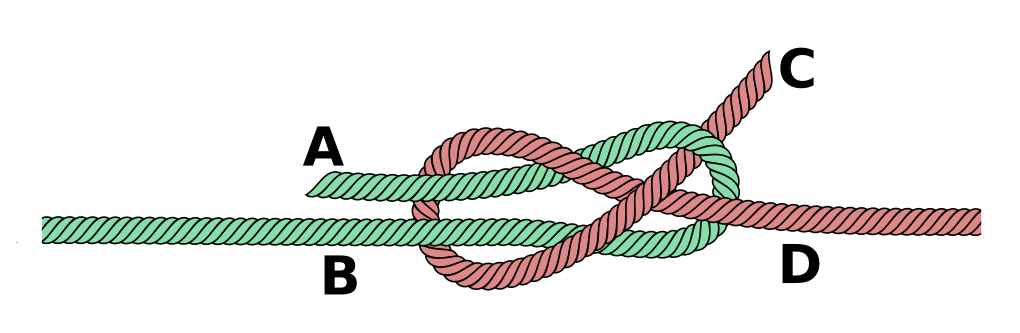
The non-slipped version of the Lapp bend.

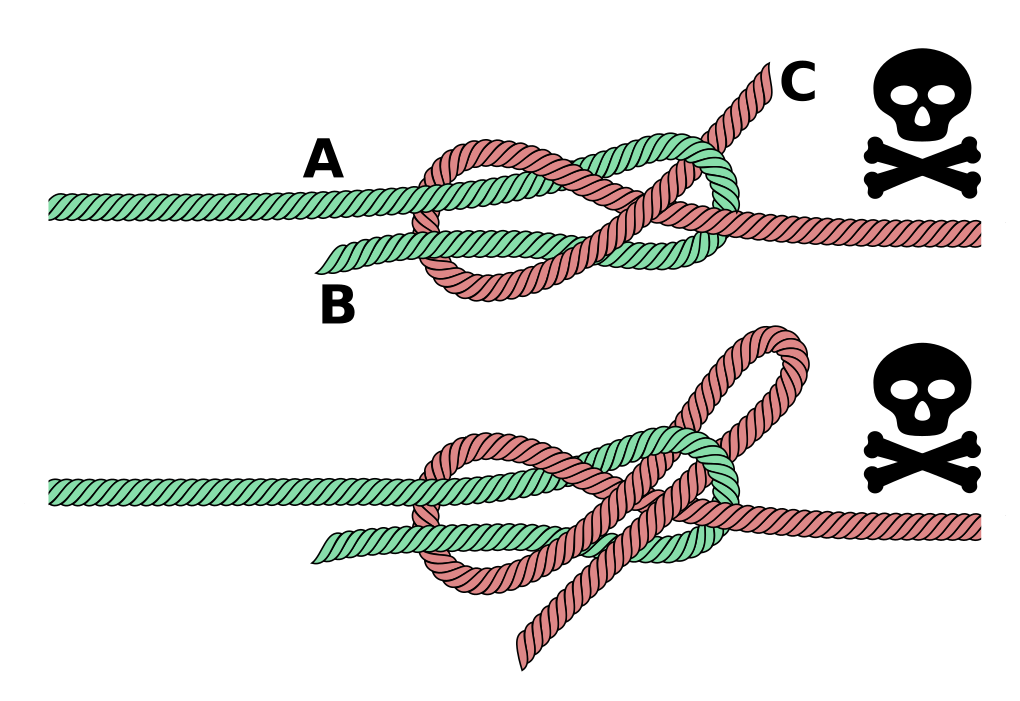
The Lapp Bend's unsafe sibling with working ends on opposite sides.

== Lapp knot as loop ==
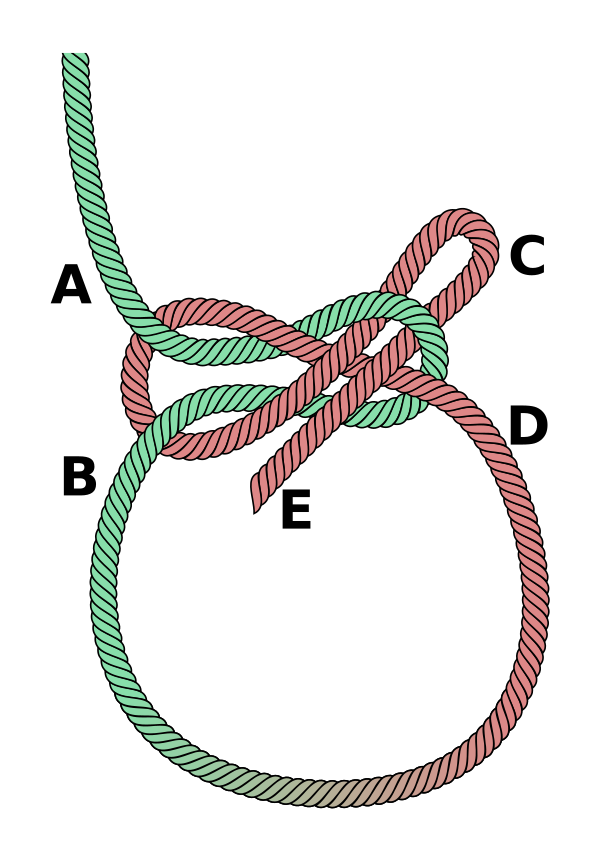
The Lapp Knot as loop.

The Lapp knot can be tied as a loop knot, in which case A becomes the standing part in the loop, B and D the two strands of the loop, and C the free end. It is also a secure loop if B is the standing part rather than A, though this variation is insecure under ring loading as it mimics the weaker version of the Lapp bend.

The knot loses some of its adjustability after the standing part has been loaded. If the knot isn't tightened properly before loading, or A and B are pulled apart, it might capsize into a Mooring hitch. The knot can also be tied by first tying a Mooring hitch, then adjusting it to the desired size, then pulling the slipped end away from the loop.

If D is the standing part, rather than A, the result is commonly known as the Eskimo bowline.

== Lapp knot as (adjustable) binding knot ==
The slipped Lapp knot can also be used as a binding knot for bundles or rolls (or a bathrobe). Its advantage over the reef knot is that the finished knot can be tightened by pulling the slip loop and end (C+E) and the working end A in opposite directions, or loosened by pulling B instead of A. When releasing C+E, it pulls tight again. Pulling only end E dissolves it completely.

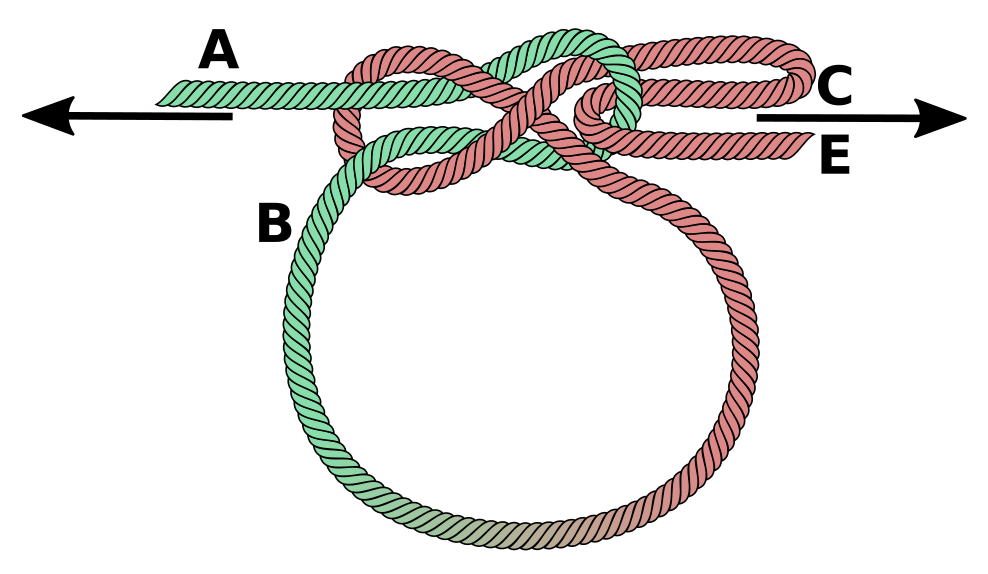
Tightening the Lapp knot loop.

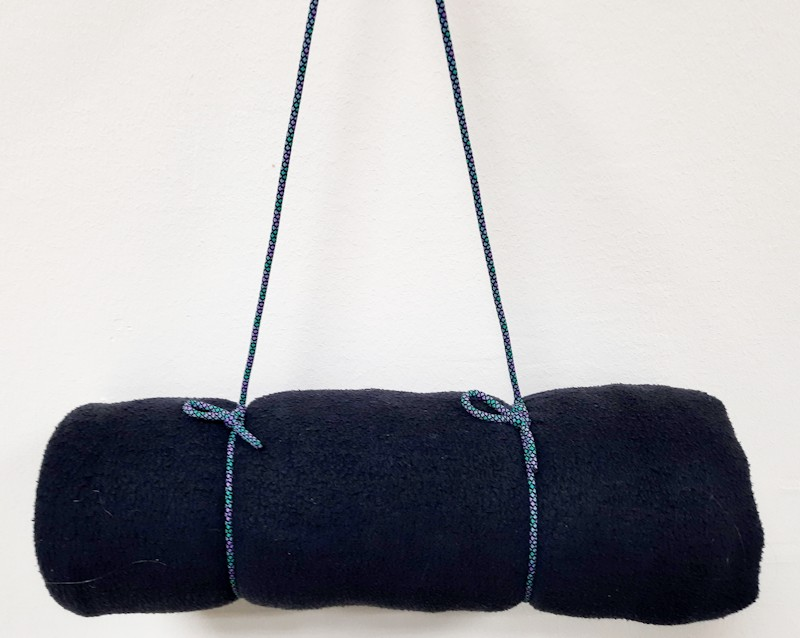
Lapp knot used as quick-release binding knot (to tie up a rolled jacket) and as loop (to hang it up by the standing part).

== History ==
The knot is documented since 1892 under various names (false weaver's bend, false sheet bend, English Bowline, Girdle Knot), and was used by various native cultures (America, Lapland, Africa, Australia). The name Lap(p) knot stems from it having been used in Lapland to tie reindeer to a sled and for lanyards. The slipped Lapp knot is also shown in The Ashley Book of Knots as #1224, a nameless decorative bathrobe cord knot.

== Alternatives ==
As a bend:

- The much more common sheet bend
- other bend knots.

As a loop:

- The bowline, cowboy bowline and other loop knots

As a binding knot:

- The reef knot is much more common, but not adjustable.
- A jamming knot (a rolling hitch tied around the other end) can also be used as an adjustable binding knot. Using a Farrimond friction hitch (tied like the hitch as the Farrimond friction hitch is bidirectional) maintains the exploding property of the Lapp knot.
- The constrictor knot can be tightened much more tightly, but needs more rope and unties less easily.
- Other binding knots
