= Rigid double splayed loop in the bight =

Knot

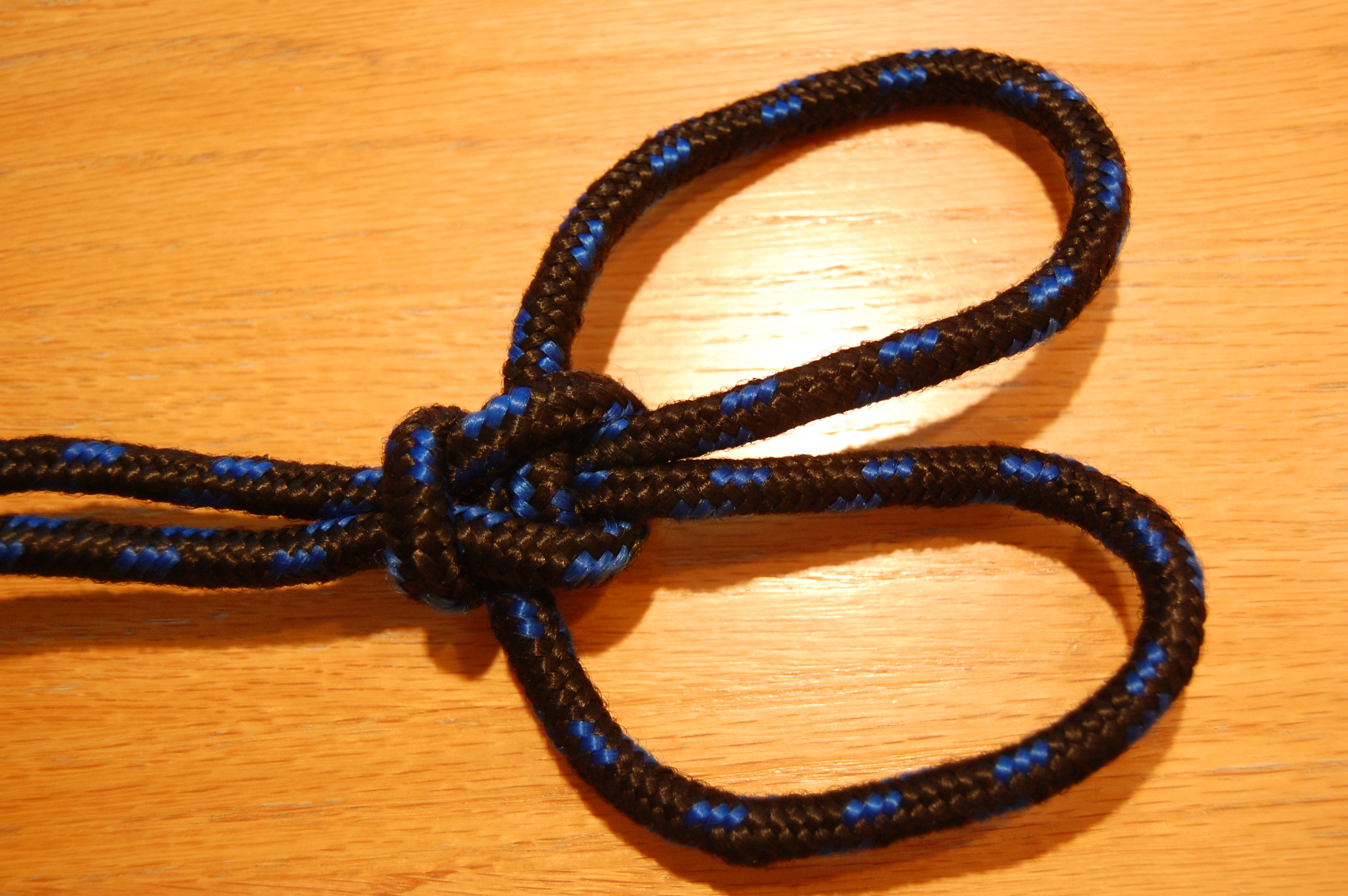
- Names: Rigid double splayed loop in the bight, double splayed loop
- Category: Loop
- Related: Alpine butterfly knot
- ABoK: #1100

The rigid double splayed loop in the bight is a knot that contains two parallel loops. Clifford Ashley wrote that it is "one of the firmest of the Double Loops since the two loops do not directly communicate with each other". (In actuality, it can be argued that the two loops do directly communicate as the two center portions of each loop simply pass down through the head knot and pass around the running ends; not significantly different, in that regard, from the Spanish Bowline). It is a variation of the alpine butterfly knot.

== How to tie it ==
This knot can be tied in the bight as C. Ashley explains, but it can also be tied in the end around objects in a simple way. This makes it suitable for improvising a harness or for slinging a ladder for a staging. This knot is simply a pair of intertwined left-handed bowlines or cowboy bowlines (ABOK #1034½) that share an element in common. To tie it:

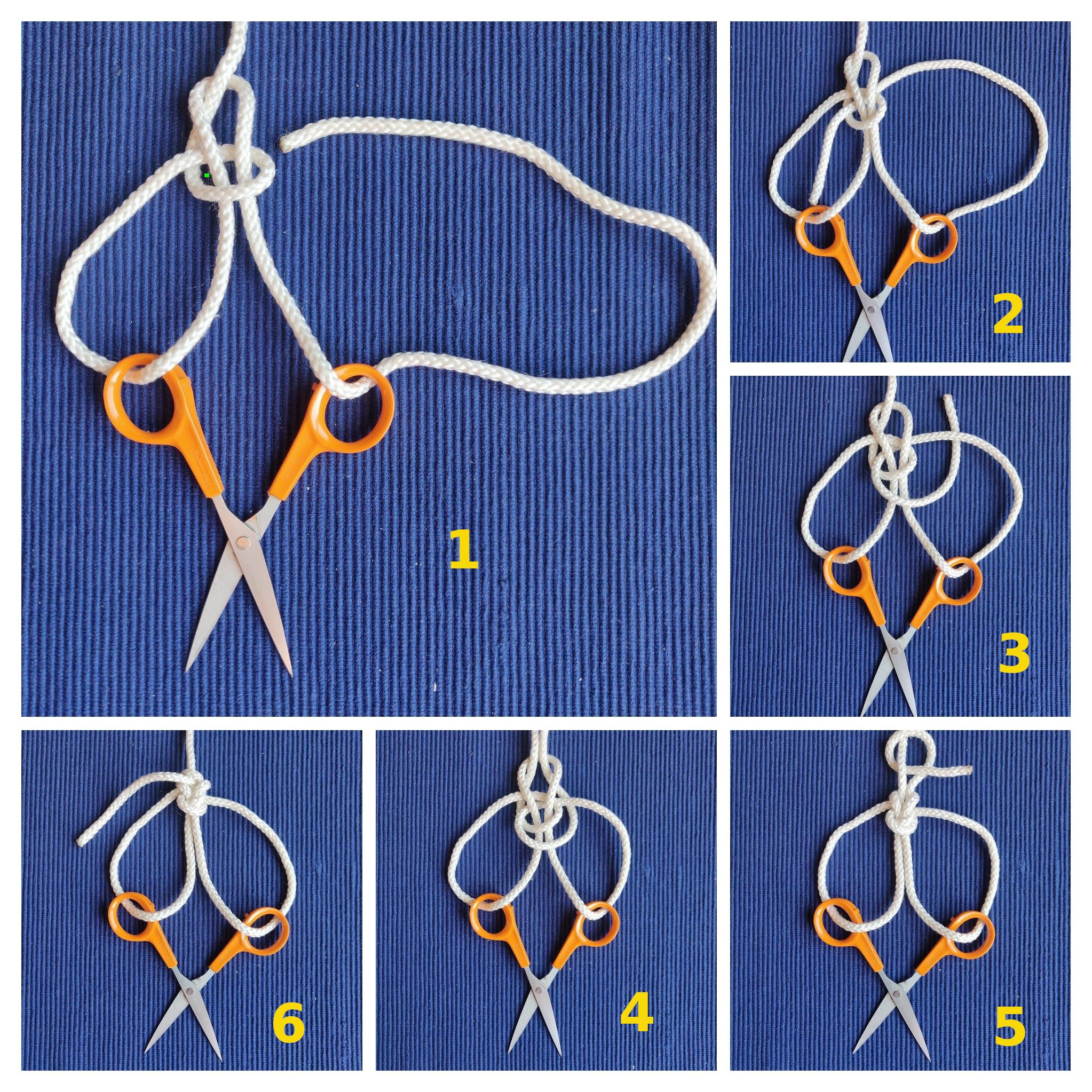
This knot is ABOK #1100 but is tied with one end around objects instead of in the bight.

- 1- Tie a left-hand bowline around the first object and pass the end of the rope through the second. Do not tighten the knot.
- 2- Pass the end of the rope through the hole marked in green in the first photo, from behind.
- 3- Complete a half hitch by passing the end through the second loop.
- 4- Finish by threading the end of the rope through the top loop parallel to the standing part. Now it is time to adjust the size of both loops as desired and then tighten the knot.
- 5-6- Optional: add a half hitch or finish the knot with a regular bowline, similar to ABOK #1075.

Replacing the cowboy bowline with a normal bowline (ABOK #1010) in the above procedure will give you a variant of the knot that only differs from the original in one additional crossing.
