= Becket hitch =

Type of knot

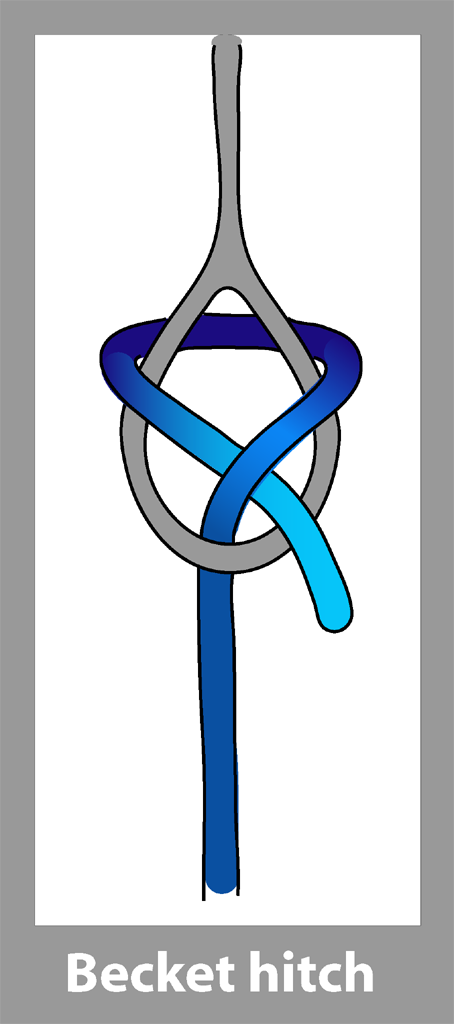
- Category: Hitch
- Related: Sheet bend, Bowline
- Typical use: A hitch made on an eye loop
- ABoK: #73, #297, #298, #334, #1475, #1900, #1902, #1915, #2008, #2152

A becket hitch, including the double becket or figure-of-eight becket hitch, is any hitch that is made on an eye loop, i.e. on a becket. A becket hitch has the same structure as the sheet bend, which joins, or "bends", the ends of two ropes together. The becket hitch, in contrast, fixes a rope to a closed eye or hook. In this instance, a becket means the eye or hook of a pulley block, an eye in the end of a rope, or a rope handle on a sailor's sea chest.

== Tying ==
For greater security, an additional round turn may be taken above the first before the line's working end is brought back under itself, creating a double becket or figure-of-eight becket. In the figure-of-eight becket hitch, the working end of the line is also passed through the becket loop, wrapped around the becket then under itself, but then the line is wrapped in the opposite direction over the incoming line, but tucked under and inside the first wrap to align with the length of the becket. The figure-of-eight becket hitch contains 2 bends: one bend around under the becket, and the other bend under and over the incoming line, then tucked under inside the first bend.

== See also ==
- List of knots
- List of hitch knots
