= Eskimo bowline =

Loop knot

Eskimo Bowline
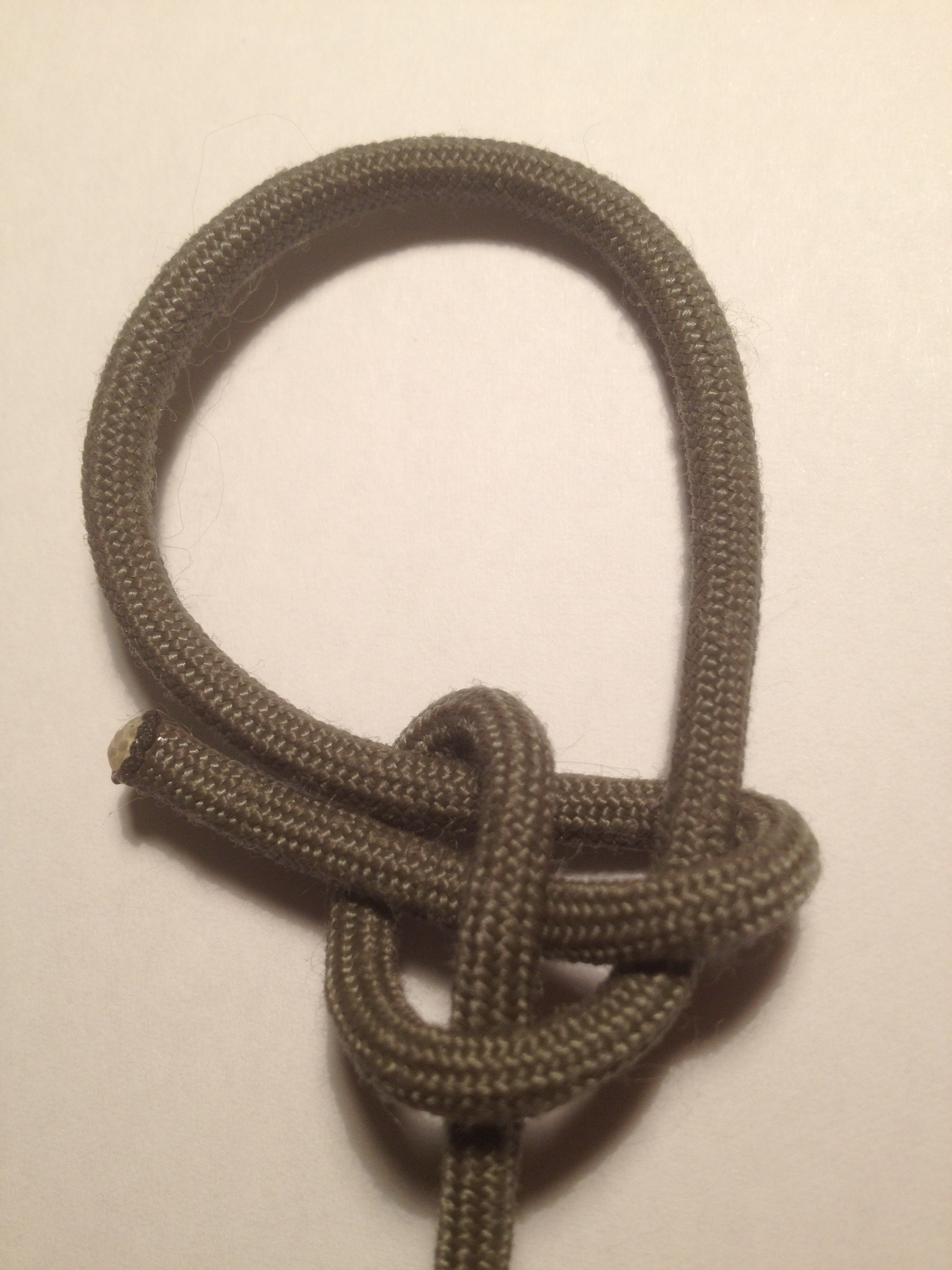
- Names: Eskimo Bowline, Sitka Loop, Anti-bowline, Cossack knot
- Category: Loop
- Origin: Ancient
- Related: Kalmyk loop, Bowline, Cowboy bowline, Sheet bend
- Releasing: Non-jamming
- Typical use: Placing a loop in the end of a rope

The Eskimo bowline, Cossack knot (Russian: Казачий узел), reverse bowline, or 'anti-bowline' is in a class of knots known as 'eye knots' or 'loop knots'. The eye is formed in the end of the rope to permit attachments/connections. It is quite common in Russia and is often used instead of the bowline (ABoK #1010). In the simple bowline, the collar component forms around the 'standing part'. In contrast, the collar component of an Eskimo bowline forms around the outgoing eye-leg.

On the first of arctic explorer John Ross' expeditions (1818) the Inuit (Eskimos) presented him a sled that contained several of these knots, showing that it is a genuine Inuit knot. The knot is not mentioned in The Ashley Book of Knots but in its Russian equivalent, the book "Морские узлы" (Marine Knots) by Lev Skryagin (1930–2000). The knot is referred to in the Russian book as the Cossack knot, and its slipped version is known as the Kalmyk loop.

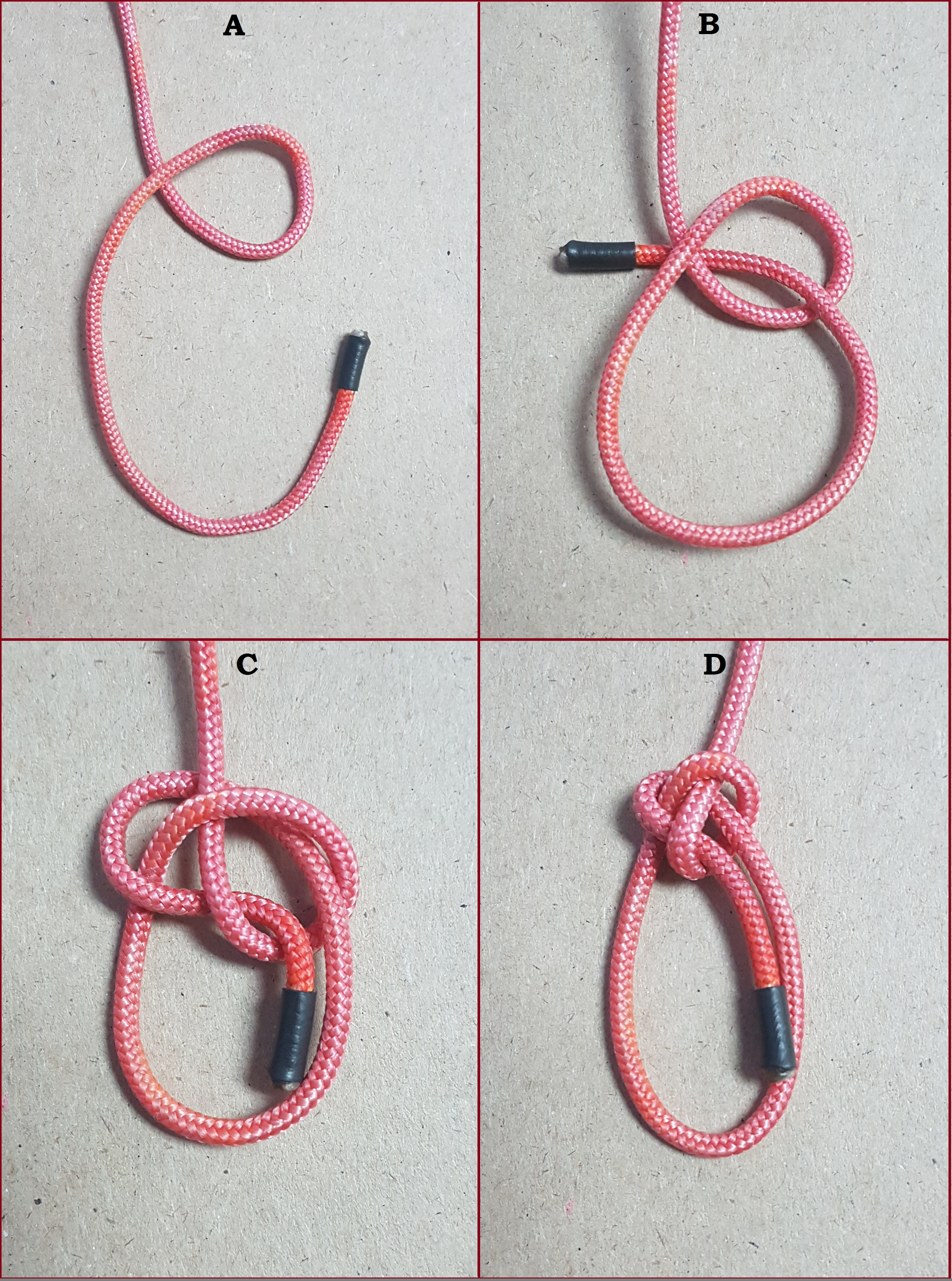
Tying an Eskimo Bowline

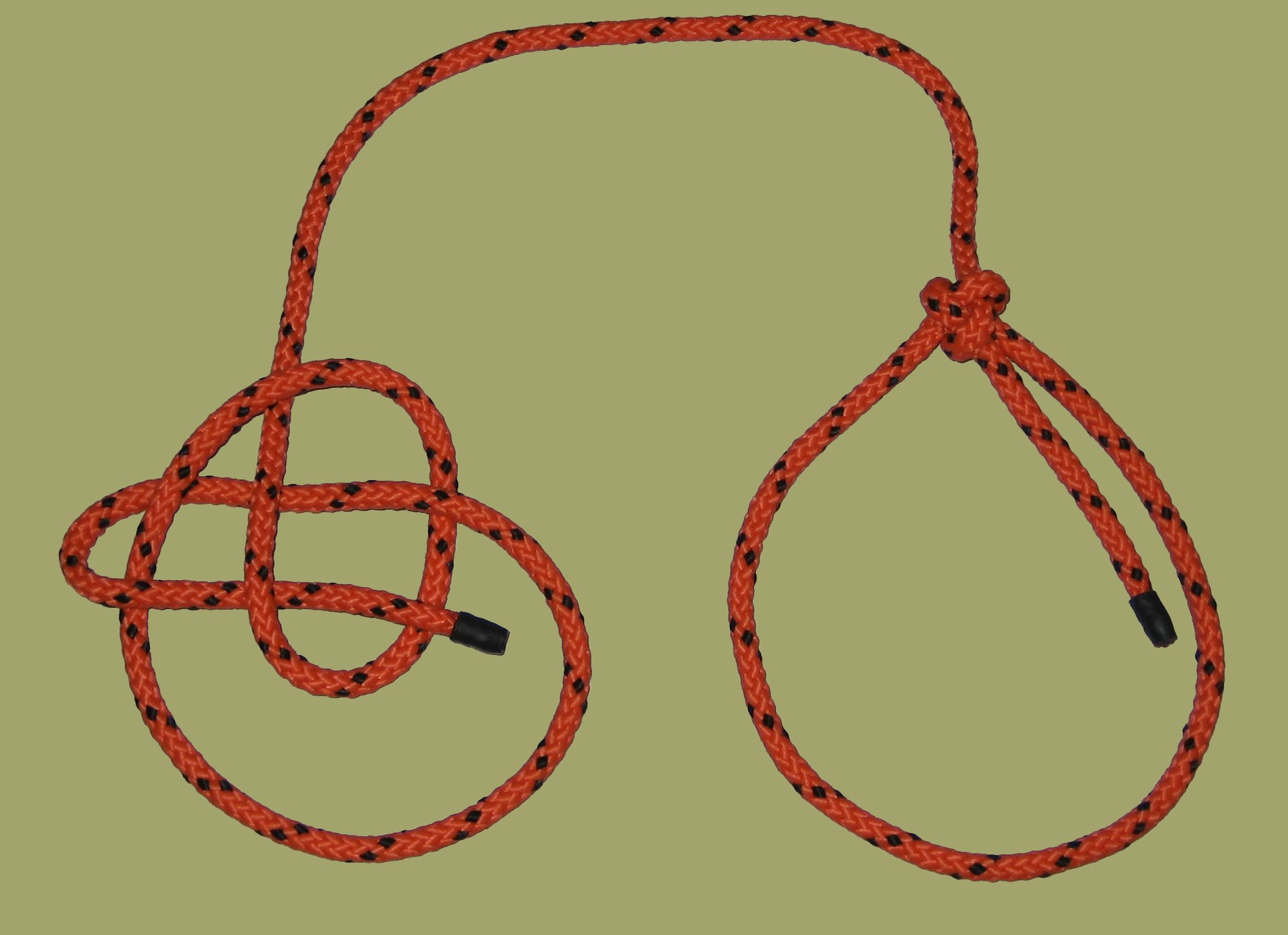
Eskimo bowline based on the method described by Geoffrey Budworth in The Illustrated Encyclopedia of Knots. The tightened knot on the right takes on a trefoil crown shape.

The Eskimo bowline is about as strong as and even more secure than the bowline, especially in synthetic lines.

Under cross load (ring loading, transverse loading profile), i.e. when the loop is pulled apart, the shown common Eskimo loop effectively mimics an ends-opposite (and inferior) left-hand sheet bend and thus can slip like the bowline; the less common Eskimo loop variant with the A–C loop (see bowline family diagram) would give a proper same-side sheet bend, thus being much stronger under cross load. Similarly, when the eye of a simple bowline is subject to a transverse loading profile, it mimics the inferior version of the Lapp bend, and so can slip and untie; the wrongly demeaned left-handed or cowboy bowline becomes the proper Lapp bend, and should hold..

All of the maneuvers to tie this knot are generally in the opposite (or 'anti' direction) relative to the bowline. After forming the 'nipping loop' with C & D (which can be formed as 'S' or 'Z' chirality) the working end is fed through that loop from the same side A as the outgoing eye leg C. This is opposite (or 'anti') direction relative to the simple (ABOK #1010) Bowline (A–D on opposite sides).

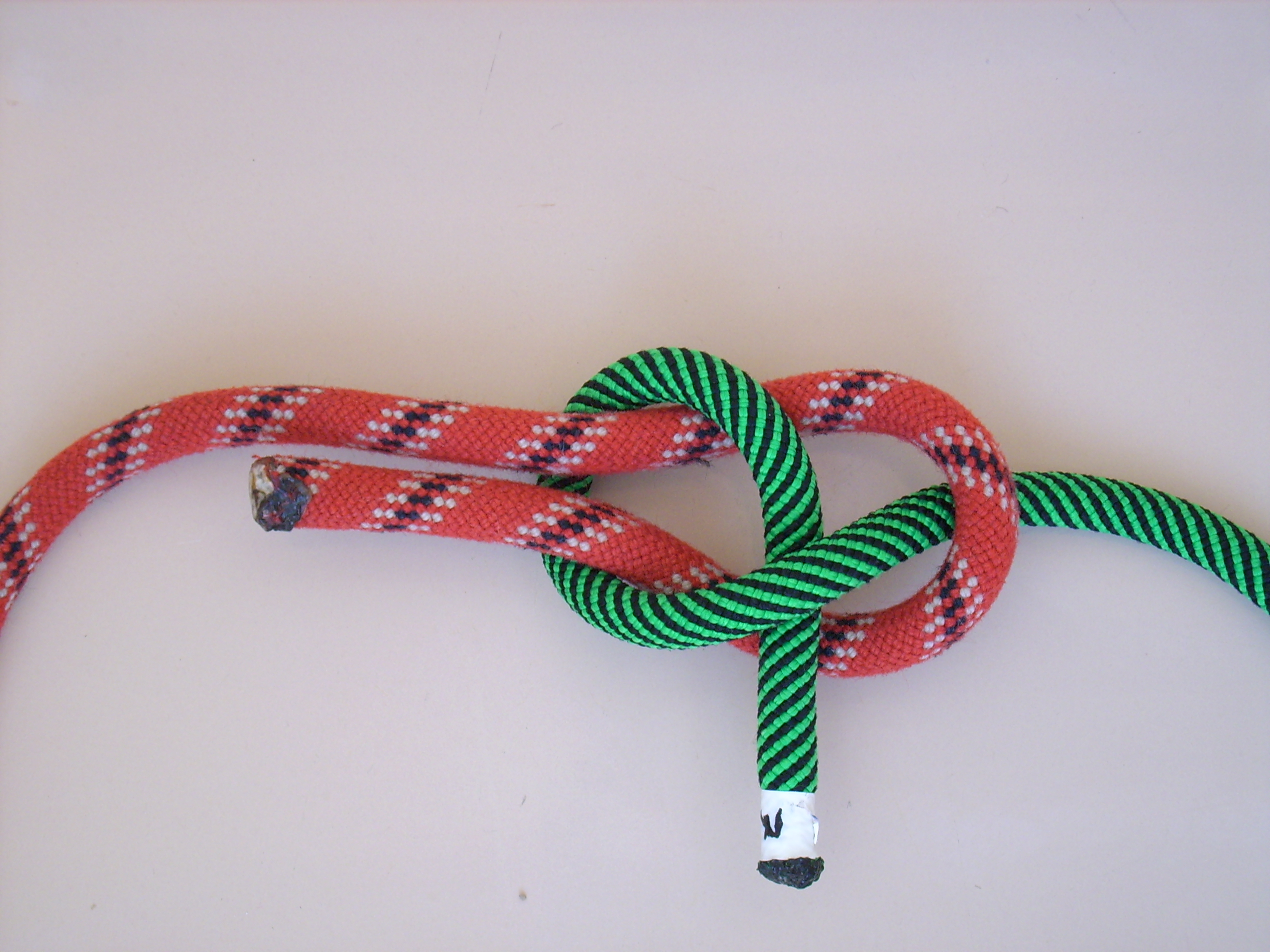
Sheet bend

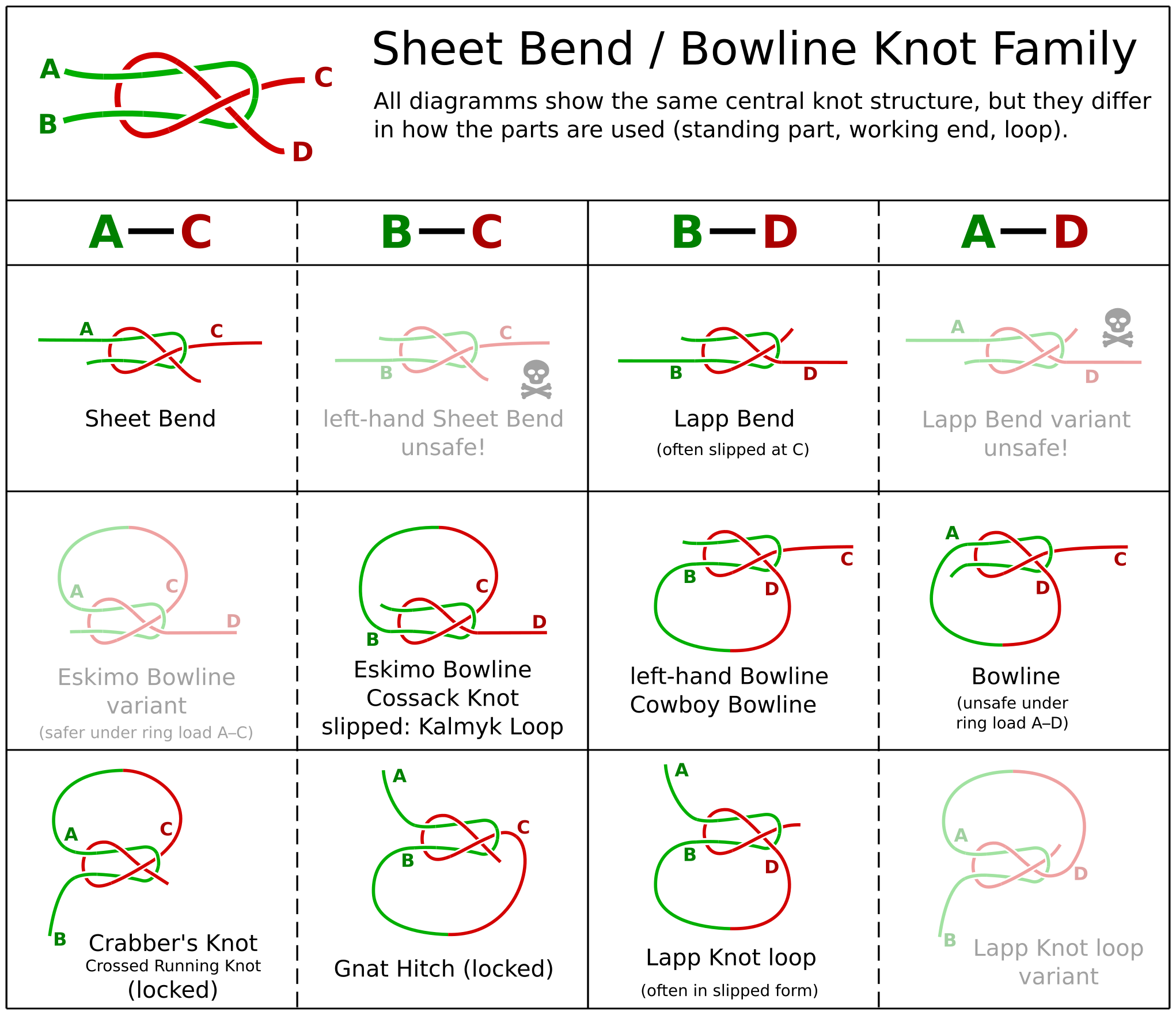
Bends and loops directly related to the sheet bend and bowline

The so called 'Eskimo' Bowline has also been known as Boas Bowline and Cossack knot - all of these names referring to the same structure. The Kalmyk loop can be made 'TIB' (Tiable In the Bight); however, it will not be 'EEL' (Either End Loadable).

== See also ==
- Kalmyk loop
