= Mooring hitch =

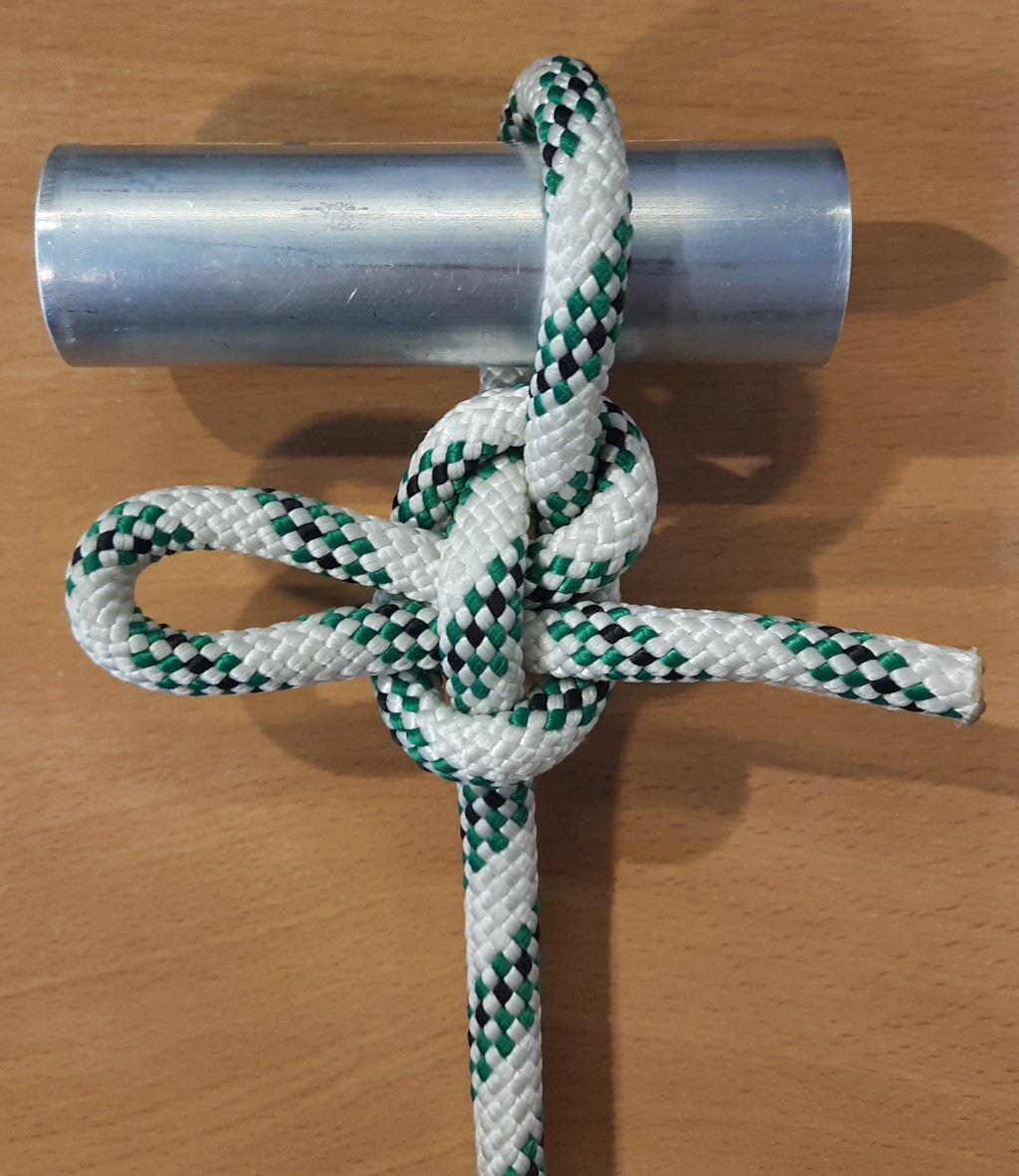
- Category: Hitch
- Origin: Ancient
- Related: Lapp knot
- Releasing: Non-jamming
- Typical use: tie a boat to a post, quick-release

The mooring hitch can be used to tie a small boat to a post, pole, bollard or similar. As it is a quick-release knot, it can be easily untied by pulling the working end E. If the working end is long enough, this can be done from the boat. It is considered rather insecure though.

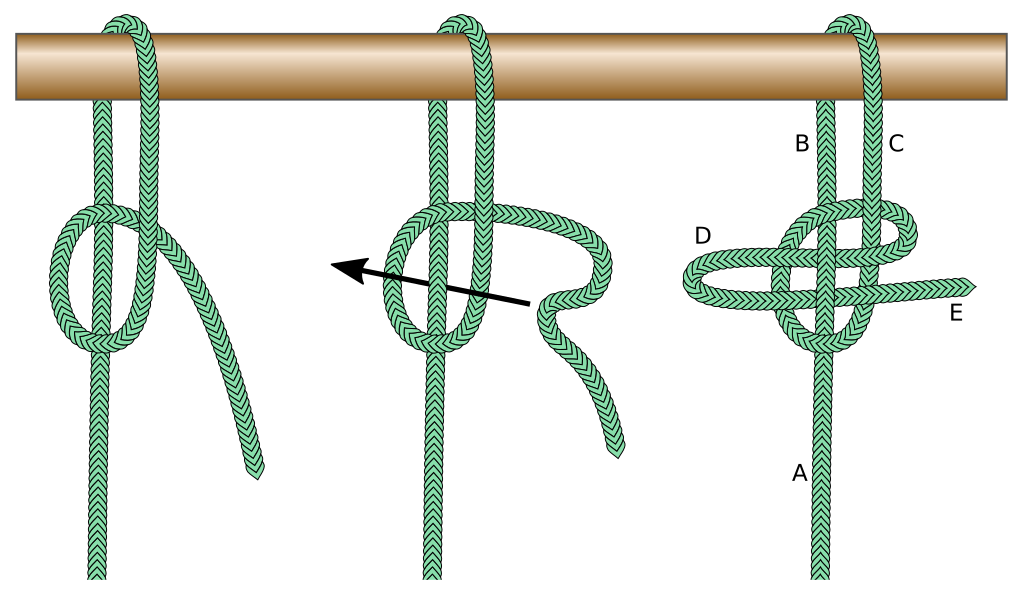
Tying the mooring hitch

The mooring hitch can slide along the standing part (A-B); a pull on the other parts (C,D) can lock it into place, forming a fixed loop also known as the Lapp knot.

== Name ==
The name mooring hitch sometimes refers to other knots like the Tugboat hitch.

== Alternatives ==
- The slipped buntline hitch is a probably more secure quick-release hitch.
- The tumble hitch is also a quick-release hitch, and it becomes completely undone and separated from the post it was tied to (exploding knot).
