= Running bowline =

Knot

- Category: Running
- Origin: Ancient
- Related: Bowline, noose
- Releasing: Non-jamming
- Typical use: Fishing out floating objects that have fallen overboard. Tightening the squaresail to the yard in high winds.
- Caveat: None.
- ABoK: #1117, #2071

The running bowline is a knot consisting of a bowline looped around its own standing end to create a noose.

The running bowline is reasonably secure. It slides easily and can be undone just as simply.

1117. The RUNNING BOWLINE KNOT is referred to by name, in A Four Years' Voyage by G. Roberts (1726), as the "RUNNING BOWLING KNOT." It is the knot universally used at sea when a NOOSE is called for. According to an old nautical authority it "is used for throwing over anything out of reach, or anything under water." Any lumber that has dropped overboard or any rigging that has gone adrift is recovered by its means.

== Tying ==
Tie a bowline in the end of a line with a small loop, and by appearance one then passes the standing part through the loop to form the noose. However, this method of forming the noose is practicable only for a short piece of line. Alternatively, one can tie the bowline tied directly around the standing part or, having tied the bowline first, one would form a bight in the standing part and pull it through the loop of the bowline.
