= Kalmyk loop =

Type of fixed loop knot

Kalmyk Loop
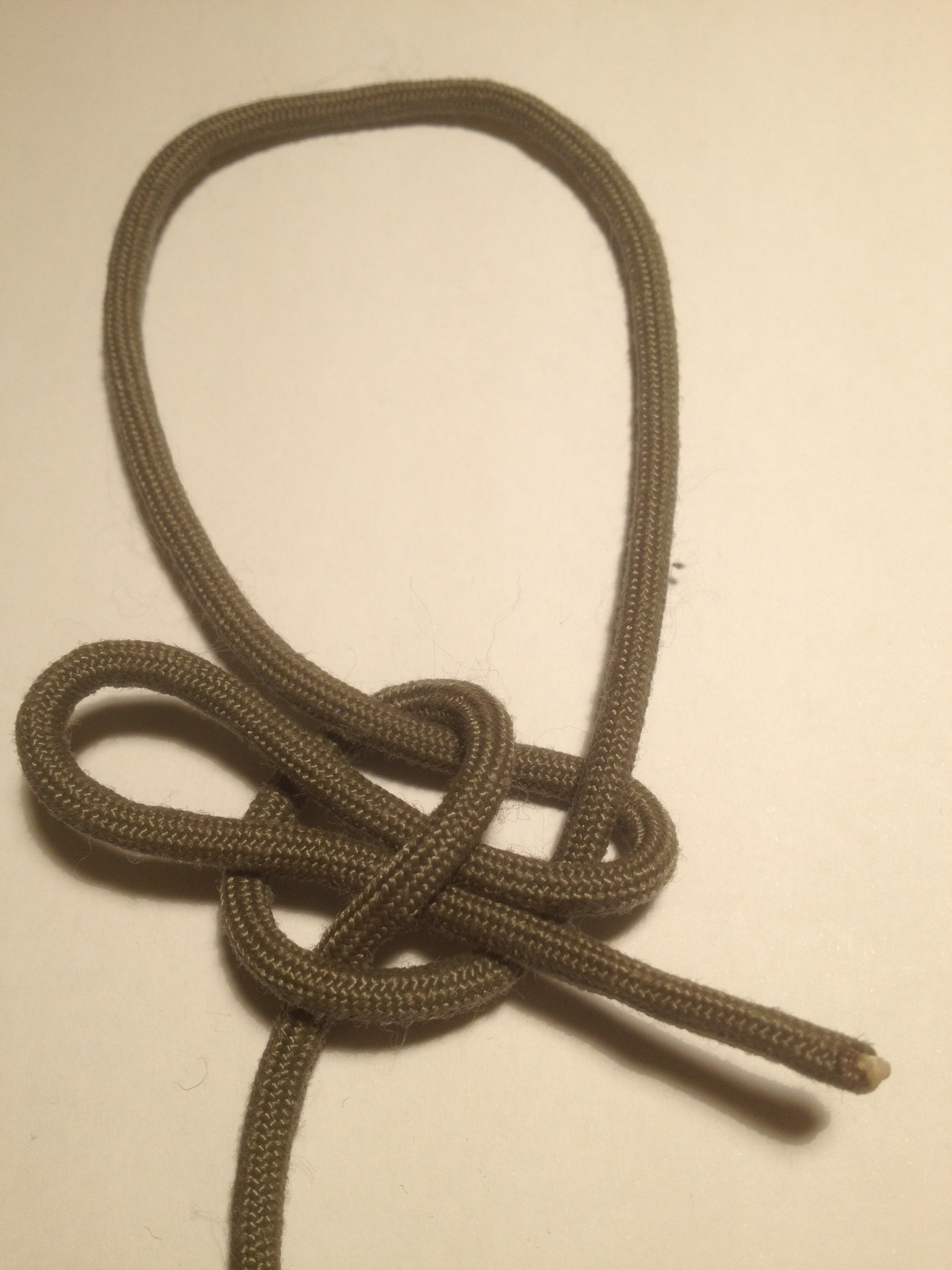
- Category: Loop
- Origin: Ancient
- Releasing: Quick Release
- ABoK: Not Listed

The Kalmyk loop (Russian: калмыцкий узел) is a fixed loop still largely unused in the West, but common in Russia and often used instead of the bowline.

The knot is named after the Kalmyks, a nomad ethnicity in Russia.

It is very quick to tie, it is secure, and it undoes quickly when pulling the free end. The knot is not mentioned in The Ashley Book of Knots but is found in its Russian equivalent, the book "Морские узлы" by Lev Skryagin.

Without the slip, the knot is known as the Eskimo bowline or Cossack knot.

== Sources ==
- Скрягин Л. Н. Морские узлы — Москва, Транспорт, 1982
