= Triple bowline =

Type of knot

- Category: Loop
- Typical use: create three loops on one knot

The triple bowline knot is a variation of the bowline knot. The knot can be applied in emergency situations, such as mountain rescue.

== Etymology ==
The name comes from the three loops that would be formed by tying this knot.

== Tying ==
The knot is tied in the same way the original bowline is, except with a doubled rope (using a bight). An overhand loop is formed in the rope, the working end is passed back through that loop, behind the standing part of the rope, back through the loop and pulled tight. The working end (bight) forms a third loop, often larger than the two equal-sized loops. The size of the third loop depends on the length of the bight pulled through the loop.

== Bowline on the bight ==
A bowline on the bight is a similar knot to the triple bowline. Instead of wrapping the bight around the standing end and then passing it back through the nipping loop, the two loops are passed through the bight so that it tightens on the standing end. It has only two active or available loops. This is used in rescue situations, especially in a case where there might be an injured person or people, as it forms a "seat" in which the injured person can be raised or lowered safely. The full triple bowline is also used in rescue situations with the third loop passed around the waist or torso.

== Double bowline ==
The triple bowline is often mistakenly referred to as the double bowline. The double bowline is in fact a bowline tied on a single strand with the nipping loop doubled up, and only has one loop.

== See also ==
- List of knots
