= Cowboy bowline =

Type of knot

- Names: Cowboy bowline, left-hand bowline, outside bowline, Dutch bowline, Dutch marine bowline, winter bowline
- Category: Loop
- Related: Bowline, Eskimo bowline, sheet bend, Lapp bend
- Releasing: Non-jamming
- ABoK: #1034½

The cowboy bowline or left-hand bowline, is a variation of the bowline loop knot.

The cowboy bowline has the working end go around the standing part on the side closer to the loop and results with the working end outside the loop. In contrast, a regular bowline has the working end finishing inside the loop. (The "rabbit" goes around the "tree" in the opposite direction from normal.) The Ashley Book of Knots states that it is "distinctly inferior" to the standard bowline because of its similarity to the left-hand sheet bend. Various tests of the different versions' strengths show little difference; conjecture about either knot's vulnerability to some failure remain pretty much only that – conjectures. However, the left-hand bowline is much more stable under ring loading, as it then acts effectively as a proper Lapp bend, while the simple bowline acts as the inferior version of the Lapp bend, which tends to slip.

As for the tail of a regular bowline finishing "inside the loop [eye]", that is more a formal-image state than one of an actual knot, as the draw of the standing part will pull the tail around so that it actually points away from the eye, but there are various ways the knot can be dressed to affect this aspect.

Some hearsay suggest the Dutch Navy uses (or used) this variant of the bowline because they consider it superior since the working end is not so easily pushed back by accident. However, there is no documentation to confirm this claim, and some Dutch knot tyers outright deny it.

Another piece of unverified lore is that it is called a winter bowline because the exposed working end on the outside would blow in the wind and prevent it from freezing to the loop on ships in the north Atlantic during winter. (This suggests that the standard bowline would be the summer bowline.)

Comparison of standard bowline (left) and cowboy bowline (right). (a) – free end of the rope, (b) – load.

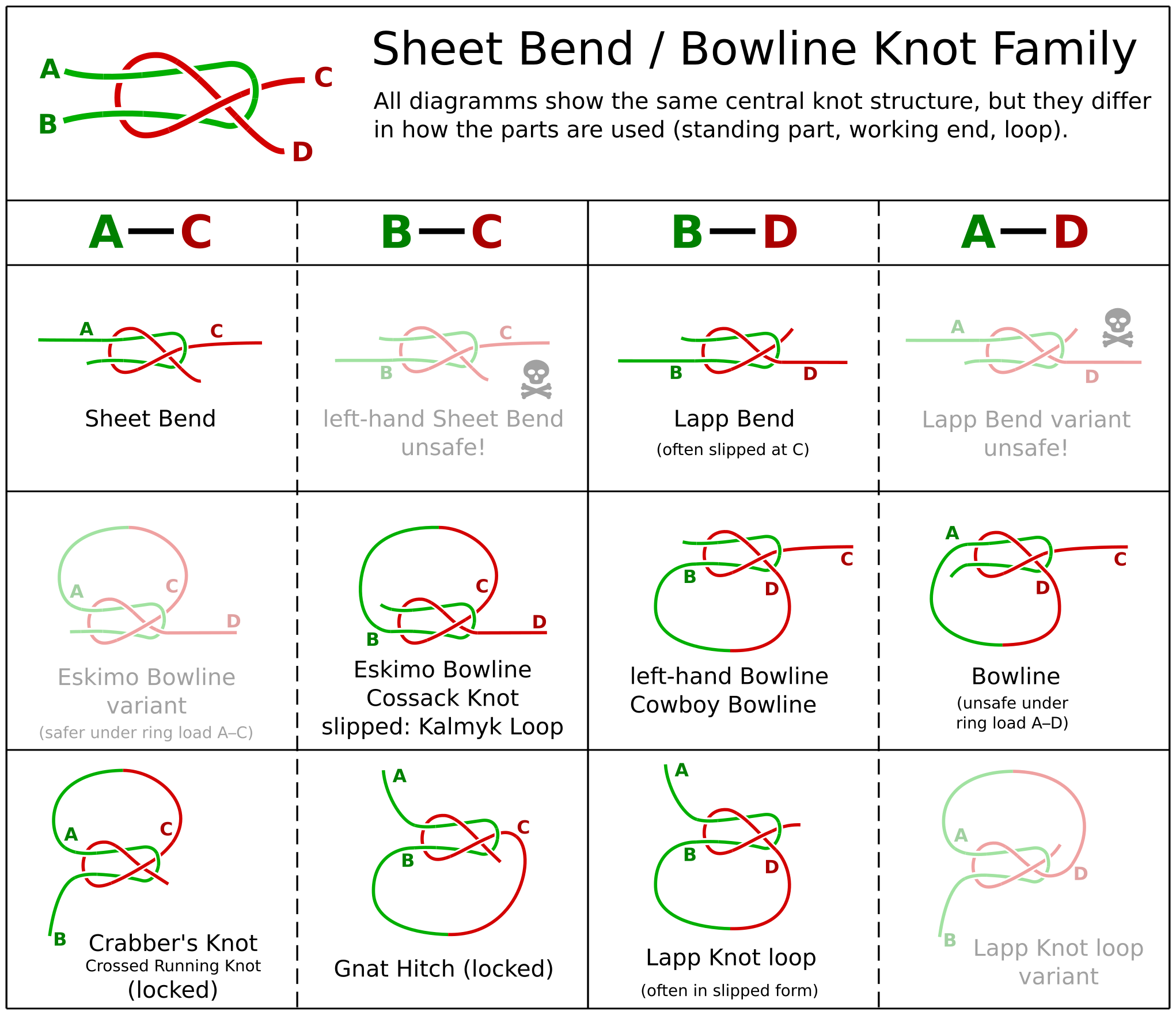
Bends and loops directly related to the sheet bend and bowline

== Security ==
There is a rule of thumb which states that the loose end should be as long as 12 times the circumference of the cord for the sake of safety.

Cowboy bowline is tested to be more resistant to cross loading (ring loading, transverse loading) than regular bowline. Like the right-hand bowline, it can spontaneously loosen under cyclic loading, and is not recommended for life-critical applications.

== See also ==
- List of knots
