= Sheet bend =

Type of knot

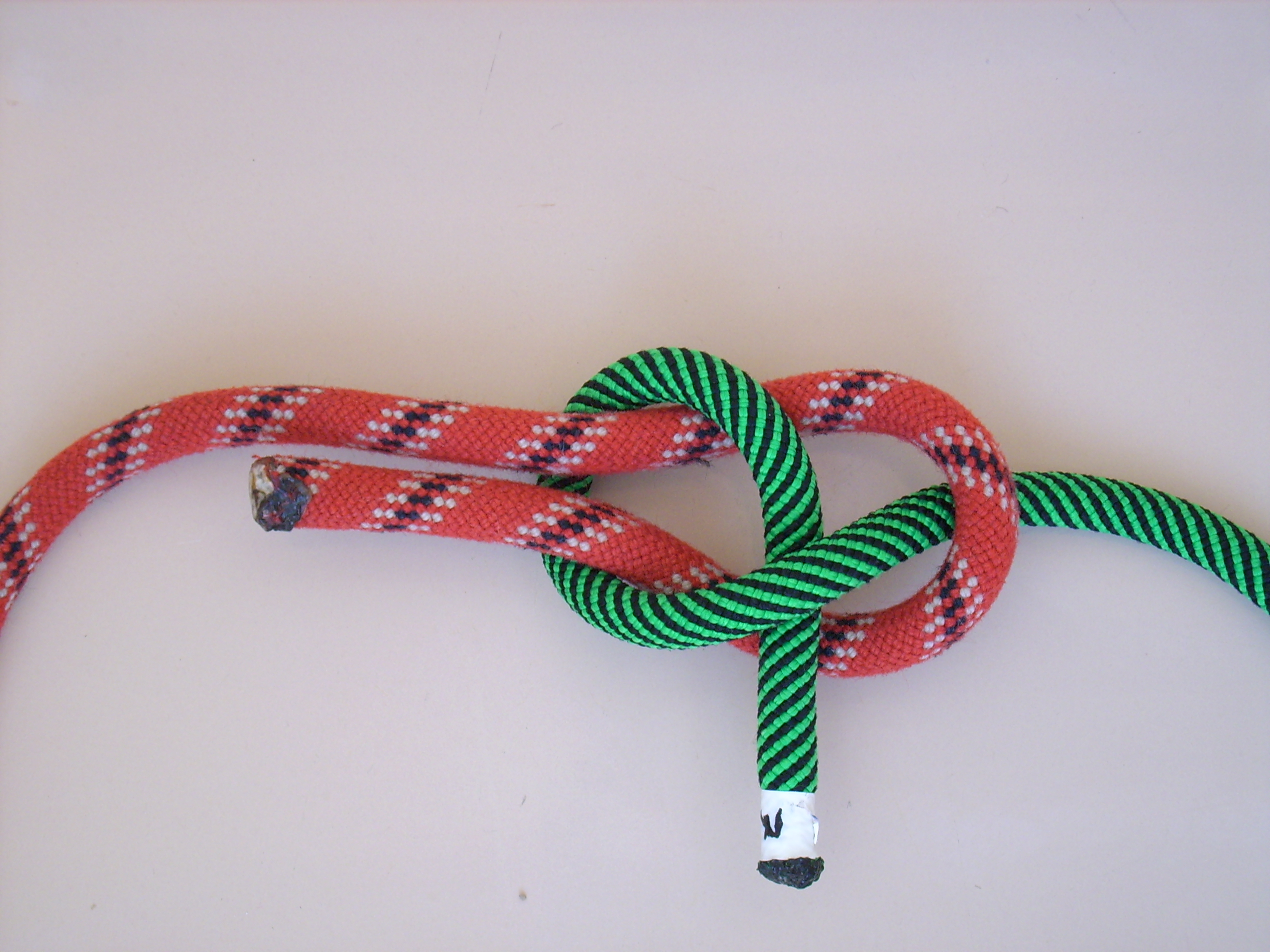
- Names: Sheet bend, Weaver's knot, weaver's hitch
- Category: Bend
- Efficiency: 48%–58%
- Related: Bowline
- Typical use: Joining two ropes of different diameters
- ABoK: Simple: #1, #66, #1431; Double: #488, #1434; Weaver's: #2

The sheet bend (also known as weaver's knot and weaver's hitch) is a bend knot. It is practical for joining lines of different diameter or rigidity.

It is quick and easy to tie, and is considered so essential it is the first knot given in the Ashley Book of Knots. Additionally, it is one of the six knots given in the International Guild of Knot Tyers' Six Knot Challenge, along with the clove hitch, bowline, reef knot (square knot), round turn and two half-hitches, and sheepshank.

The sheet bend is related in structure to the bowline; like the bowline, it has a tendency to work loose when not under load. For increased security, it is sometimes recommended that one add another turn in the smaller end, making a double sheet bend; in most cases, however, a single sheet bend should suffice. The becket hitch is another structurally similar knot.

As a bend, its advantages lie in its simplicity and non-jamming properties.

It is commonly taught in Scouting.

== Definition ==
A sheet is a line used to trim sails. A bend is a knot used to join the ends of two lines. The "sheet bend" is mentioned in David Steel's 1794 book Elements and Practice of Rigging and Seamanship but was used by Neolithic peoples for tying the meshes of fishing nets. The name "weaver's knot" comes from its historic use in textile mills. Even in modern operations, weavers are taught to use this particular knot when correcting broken threads in the warp.

== Method ==
Weaver at Queen Street Mill demonstrating a weaver's knot

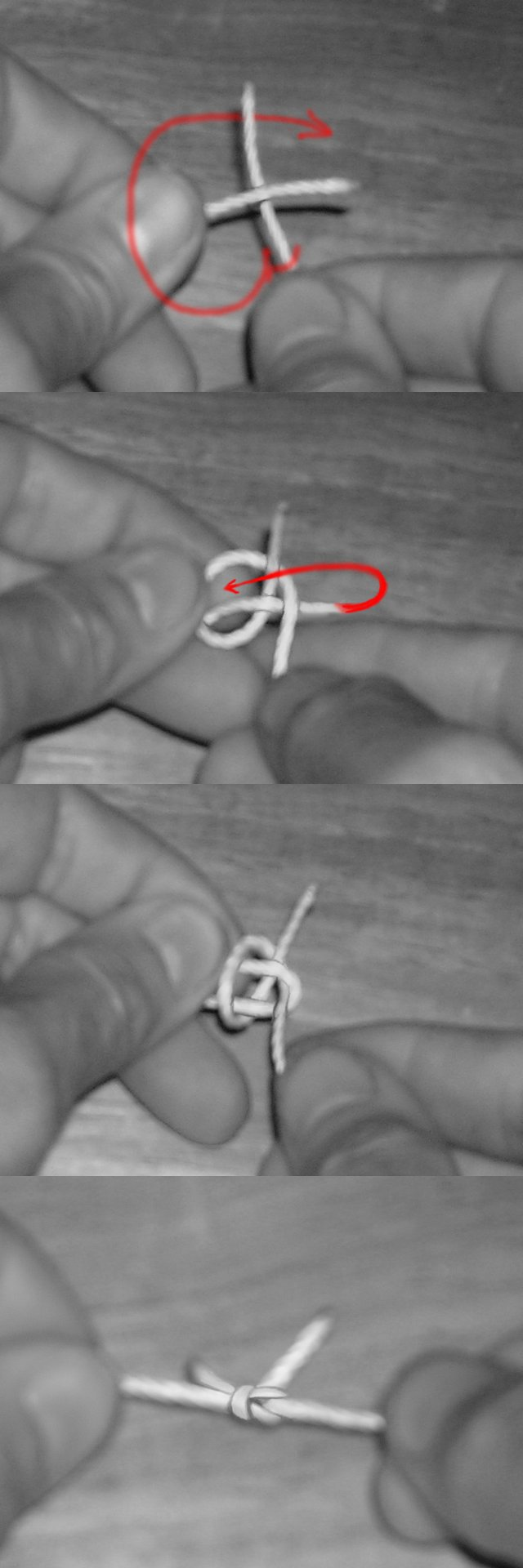
Steps in tying a weaver's knot

The sheet bend may be tied by various methods: the basic "rabbit through the hole" method of forming a half hitch in the bight of the larger rope, by a more expedient method shown in Ashley as ABoK #1431 (similar to the method used by an experienced sailor or mountaineer to tie a bowline) or by a trick method (ABoK#2562), involving upsetting a noose knot over a short end of the "larger" rope. Lines of equal size may be joined with a sheet bend, but when one is larger, it plays the simpler role of the "eye" (red line shown in the infobox), rather than the half-hitch (in green)

One type of weaver's knot is topologically equivalent to a sheet bend, but is tied (usually in smaller stuff) with a different approach. Sheet bends are also used for netting.

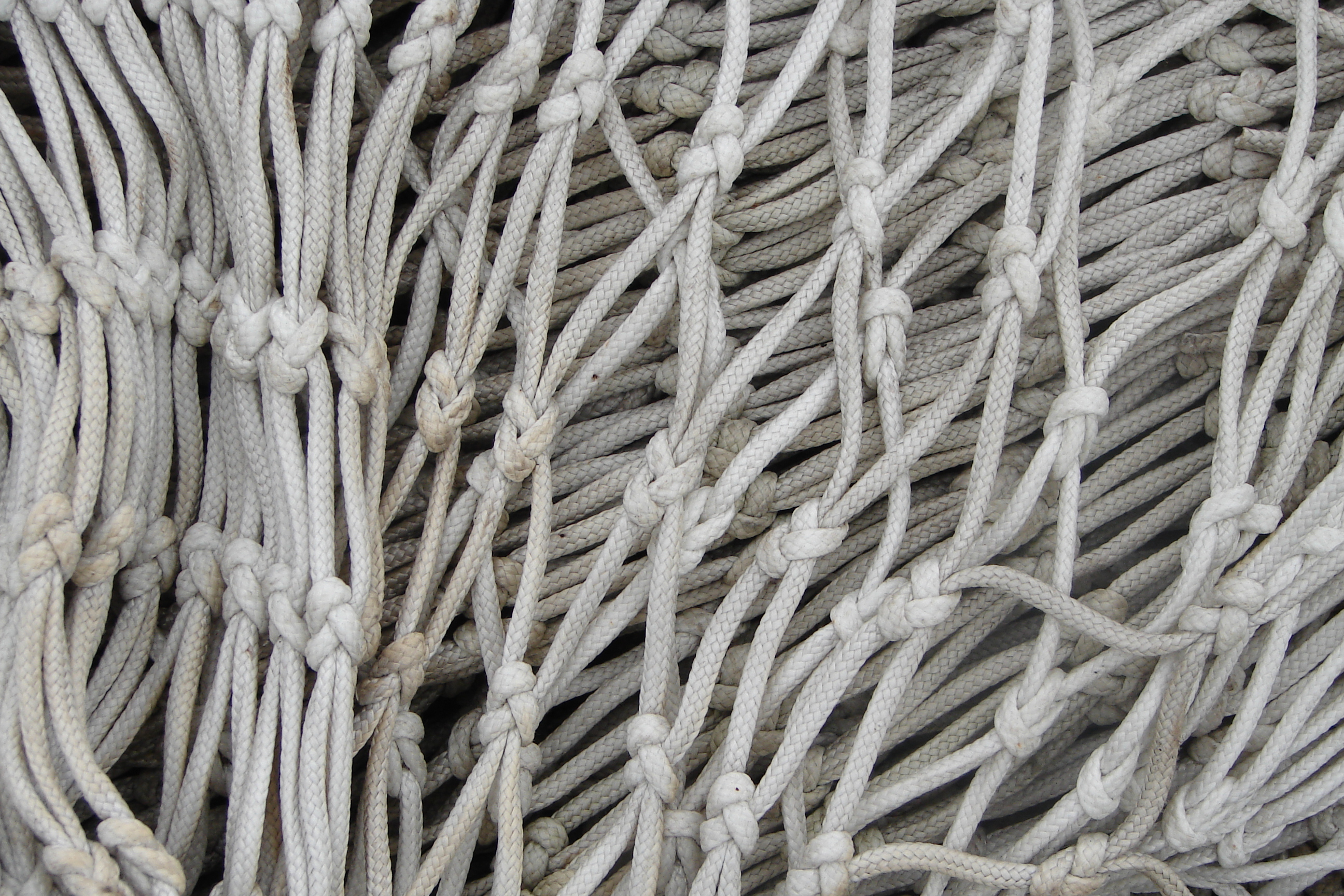
A fish net made from sheet bends

The Ashley Book of Knots states that a left-hand sheet bend (where the two free ends are on opposite sides of the knot) is inferior to the regular sheet bend. More recent testing on the left-hand bowline has shown that there is little difference in strength between it and the regular bowline. While that research does not directly address bends, but since a bowline is a sheet bend on a bight, it does suggest that it is plausible that there is little difference in strength between the left-hand sheet bend and regular sheet bend.

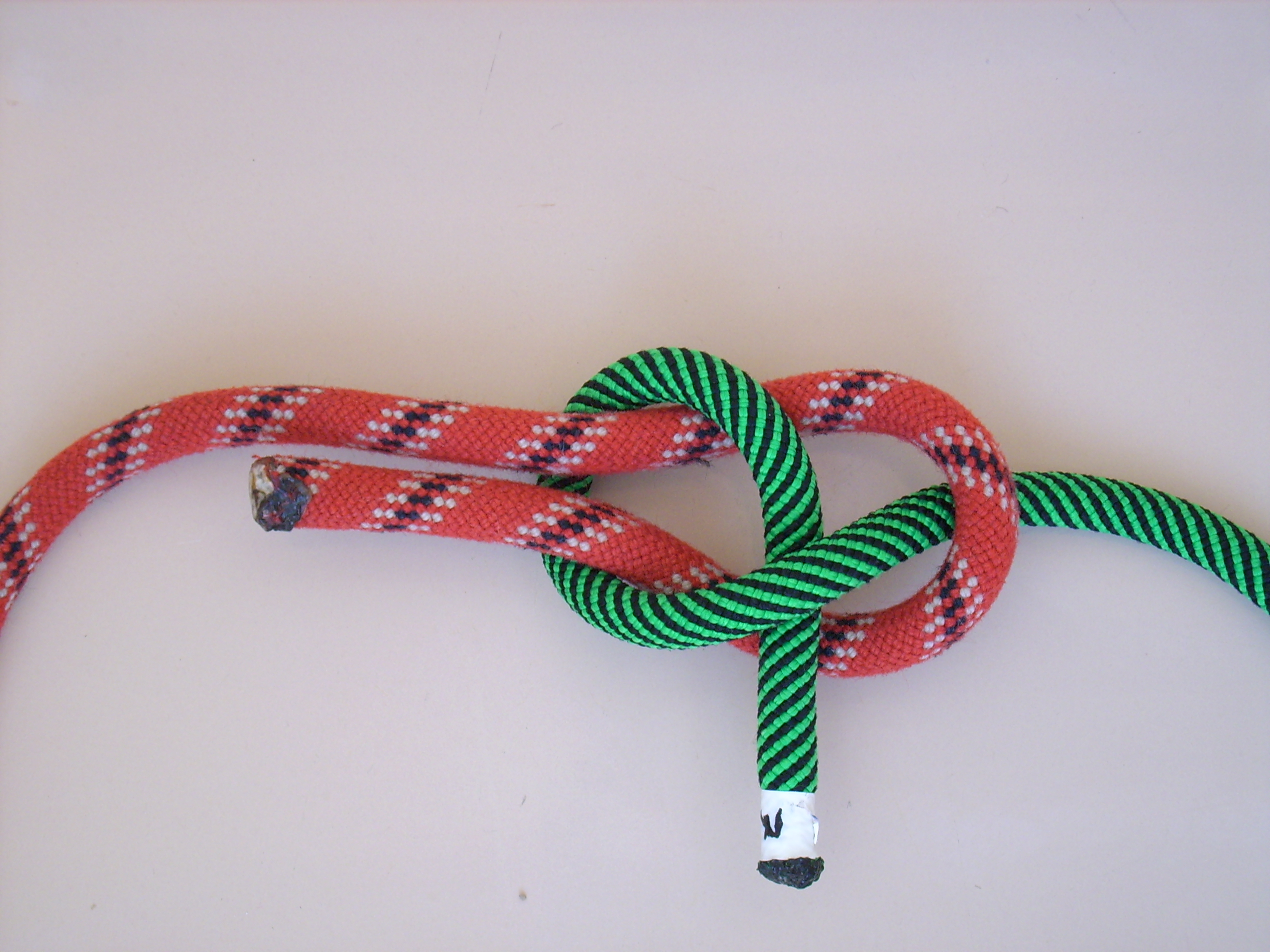
Sheet bend

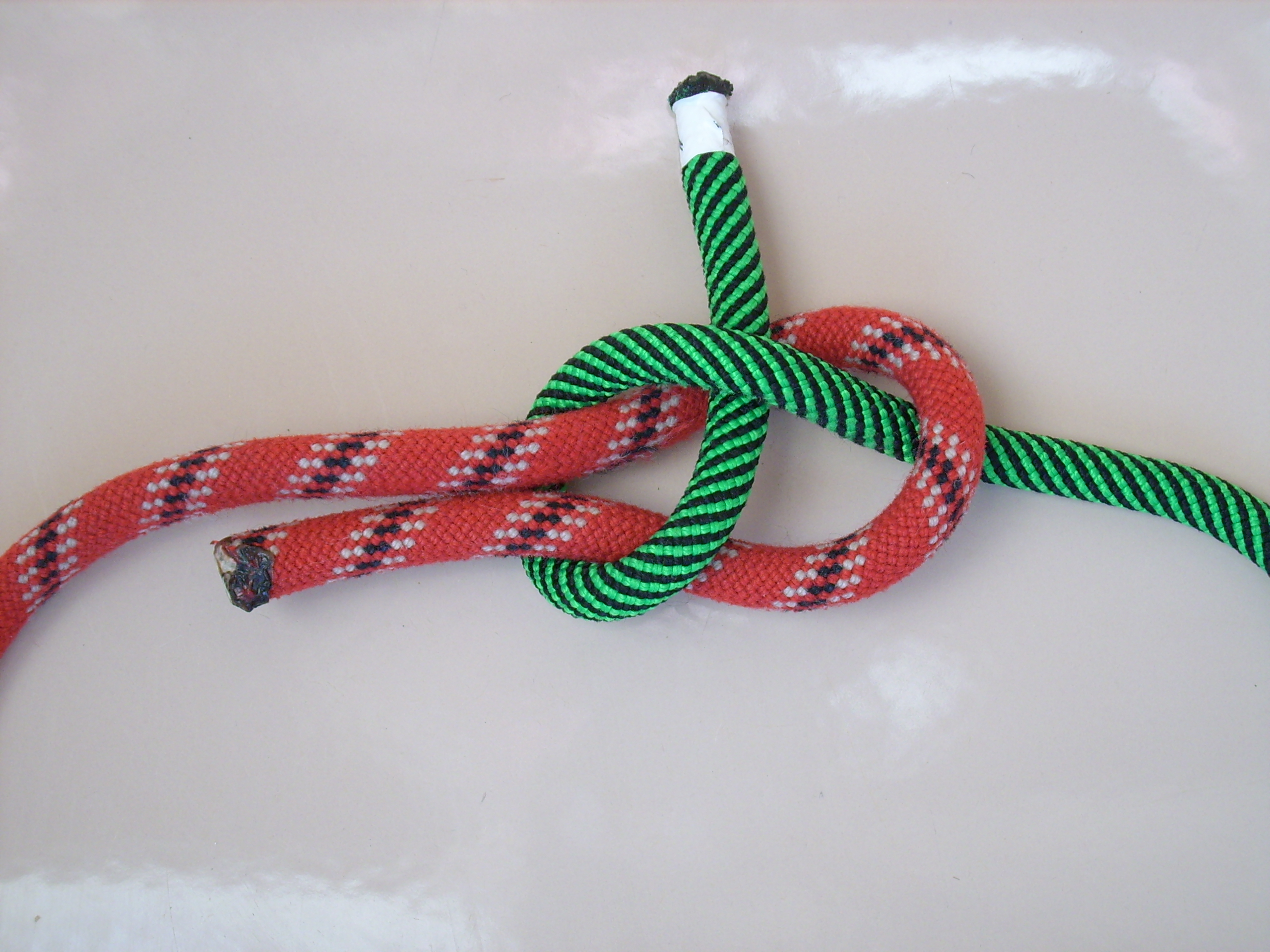
Left-hand sheet bend

== Double sheet bend ==
When lines are of unequal diameter or rigidity it is necessary for security to "double" the sheet bend by making an additional round turn below the first and again bringing the working end back under itself. The free ends should end up on the same side of the knot for maximum strength.

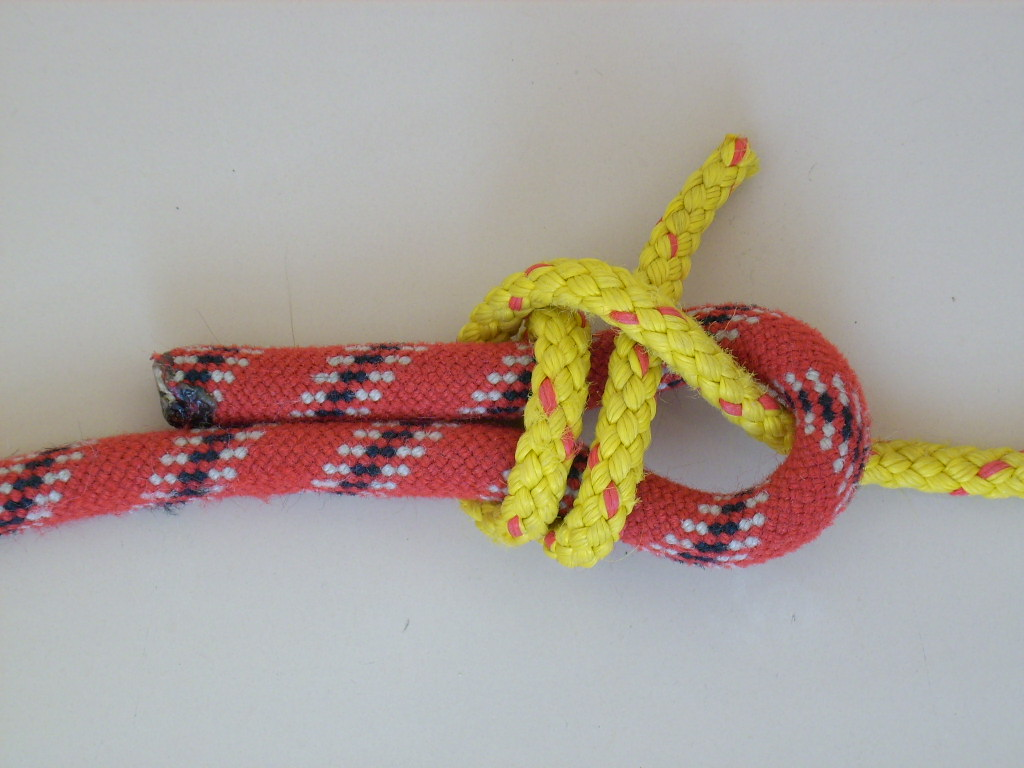
The double sheet bend

== Security ==
A study of 8 different bends using climbing rope of equal diameter said the sheet bend was weak. In one test, it pulled apart with less than half the tension that other knots withstood. The authors recommend "2 half hitches on the bend back line and overhand knot on turn thru line." Even with these, it was always a bottom performer and the double sheet bend did little better. However, the butterfly bend did the best.

After performing security testing, Ashley wrote with regard to the Sheet Bend: "Some readers may be surprised to find the Sheet Bend with so low a rating, but these tests were made in exceptionally slippery material. The Sheet Bend is the most practical of bends and quite secure enough for ordinary purposes."

== See also ==
- List of bend knots
- List of knots
