= Bowline =

Simple knot used to form a fixed loop at the end of a rope

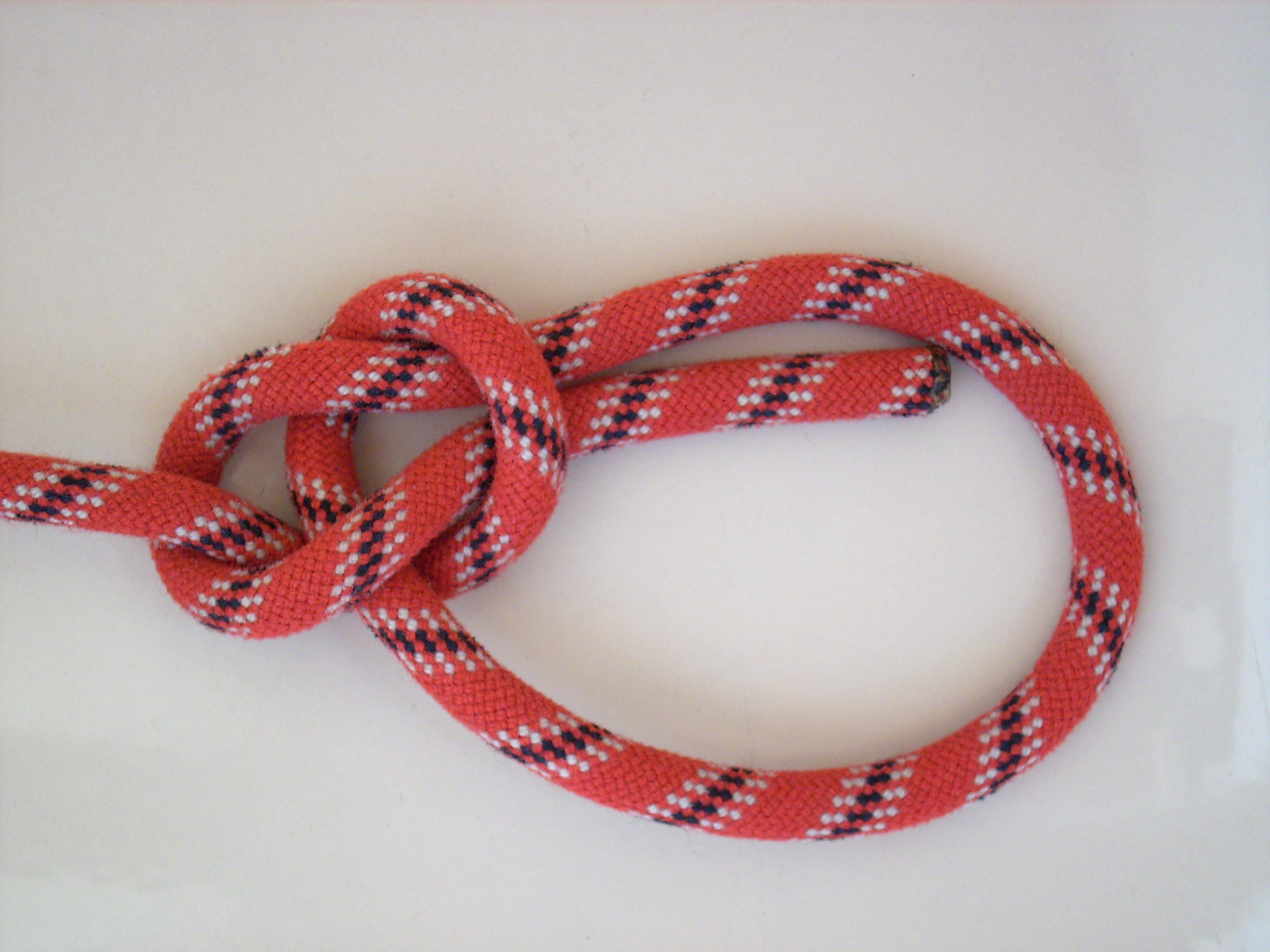
- Names: Bowline, Boling knot (archaic)
- Category: Loop
- Origin: Ancient
- Related: Sheet bend, double bowline, water bowline, Yosemite bowline, Spanish bowline, Portuguese bowline, triple bowline, bowline on a bight, running bowline, Poldo tackle, Eskimo bowline, cowboy bowline, cossack knot, Kalmyk loop
- Releasing: Non-jamming
- Typical use: Making a fixed loop at the end of a line.
- Caveat: While widely considered a reliable knot, when tied in certain materials or loading conditions it may not hold. Tends to work itself loose when not under tension.
- ABoK: #1010, #1716
- Instructions

The bowline (/ˈboʊlɪn/) is an ancient and simple knot used to form a fixed loop at the end of a rope. It has the virtues of being both easy to tie and untie; most notably, it is easy to untie after being subjected to a load. The bowline is sometimes referred to as king of the knots because of its importance. Along with the sheet bend and the clove hitch, the bowline is often considered one of the most essential knots.

The common bowline shares some structural similarity with the sheet bend. Virtually all end-to-end joining knots (i.e., bends) have a corresponding loop knot.

Although the bowline is generally considered a reliable knot, its main deficiencies are a tendency to work loose when not under load (or under cyclic loading), to slip when pulled sideways, and the bight portion of the knot to capsize in certain circumstances. To address these shortcomings, a number of more secure variations of the bowline have been developed for use in safety-critical applications, or by securing the knot with an overhand knot backup.

== History ==
The bowline's name has an earlier meaning, dating to the Age of Sail. On a square-rigged ship, a bowline (sometimes spelled as two words, bow line) is a rope that holds the edge of a square sail towards the bow of the ship and into the wind, preventing it from being taken aback. A ship is said to be on a "taut bowline" when these lines are made as taut as possible in order to sail close-hauled to the wind.

The bowline knot is thought to have been first mentioned in John Smith's 1627 work A Sea Grammar under the name Boling knot. Smith considered the knot to be strong and secure, saying, "The Boling knot is also so firmly made and fastened by the bridles into the cringles of the sails, they will break, or the sail split before it will slip." (Note: The orthography of this quote has been modernized for clarity.)

Another possible finding was discovered on the rigging of the Ancient Egyptian Pharaoh Khufu's solar ship (26th century B.C.) during an excavation in 1954.

== Usage ==
The bowline is used to make a loop at one end of a line. It is tied with the rope's working end also known as the "tail" or "end". The loop may pass around or through an object during the making of the knot. The knot tightens when loaded at (pulled by) the standing part of the line.

The bowline is commonly used in sailing small craft, for example to fasten a halyard to the head of a sail or to tie a jib sheet to a clew of a jib. The bowline is well known as a rescue knot for such purposes as rescuing people who might have fallen down a hole, or off a cliff onto a ledge. This knot is particularly useful in such a situation because it is possible to tie with one hand. As such, a person needing rescue could hold onto the rope with one hand and use the other to tie the knot around their waist before being pulled to safety by rescuers. The Federal Aviation Administration recommends the bowline knot for tying down light aircraft.

A rope with a bowline retains approximately 2/3 of its strength, with variances depending upon the nature of the rope, as in practice the exact strength depends on a variety of factors.

In the United Kingdom, the knot is listed as part of the training objectives for the Qualified Firefighter Assessment.

== Security ==
As noted above, the simplicity of the bowline makes it a good knot for a general purpose end-of-line loop. However, in situations that require additional security, several variants have been developed:

=== Round turn bowline ===
The round turn bowline is made by the addition of an extra turn in the formation of the "rabbit hole" before the working end is threaded through.

=== Water bowline ===
Similar to the double bowline, the water bowline is made by forming a clove hitch before the working end is threaded through. It is said to be stronger and also more resistant to jamming than the other variations, especially when wet.

=== Yosemite bowline ===
In this variation the knot's working end is taken round the loop in the direction of the original round turn, then threaded back up through the original round turn before the knot is drawn tight. The Yosemite bowline is often used in climbing.

== Other variants ==
The cowboy bowline (also called Dutch bowline), French bowline, and Portuguese bowline are variations of the bowline, each of which makes one loop. (Names of knots are mostly traditional and may not reflect their origins.) A running bowline can be used to make a noose which draws tighter as tension is placed on the standing part of the rope. The Birmingham bowline has two loops; the working part is passed twice around the standing part (the "rabbit" makes two trips out of the hole and around the tree). Other two-loop bowline knots include the Spanish bowline and the bowline on the bight; these can be tied in the middle of a rope without access to the ends. A triple bowline is used to make three loops. An Eskimo bowline or Cossack knot is a bowline where the running end goes around the loop-start rather than the main part and has a more symmetric triangular shaped knot. A slipped version of the Cossack knot is called Kalmyk loop.

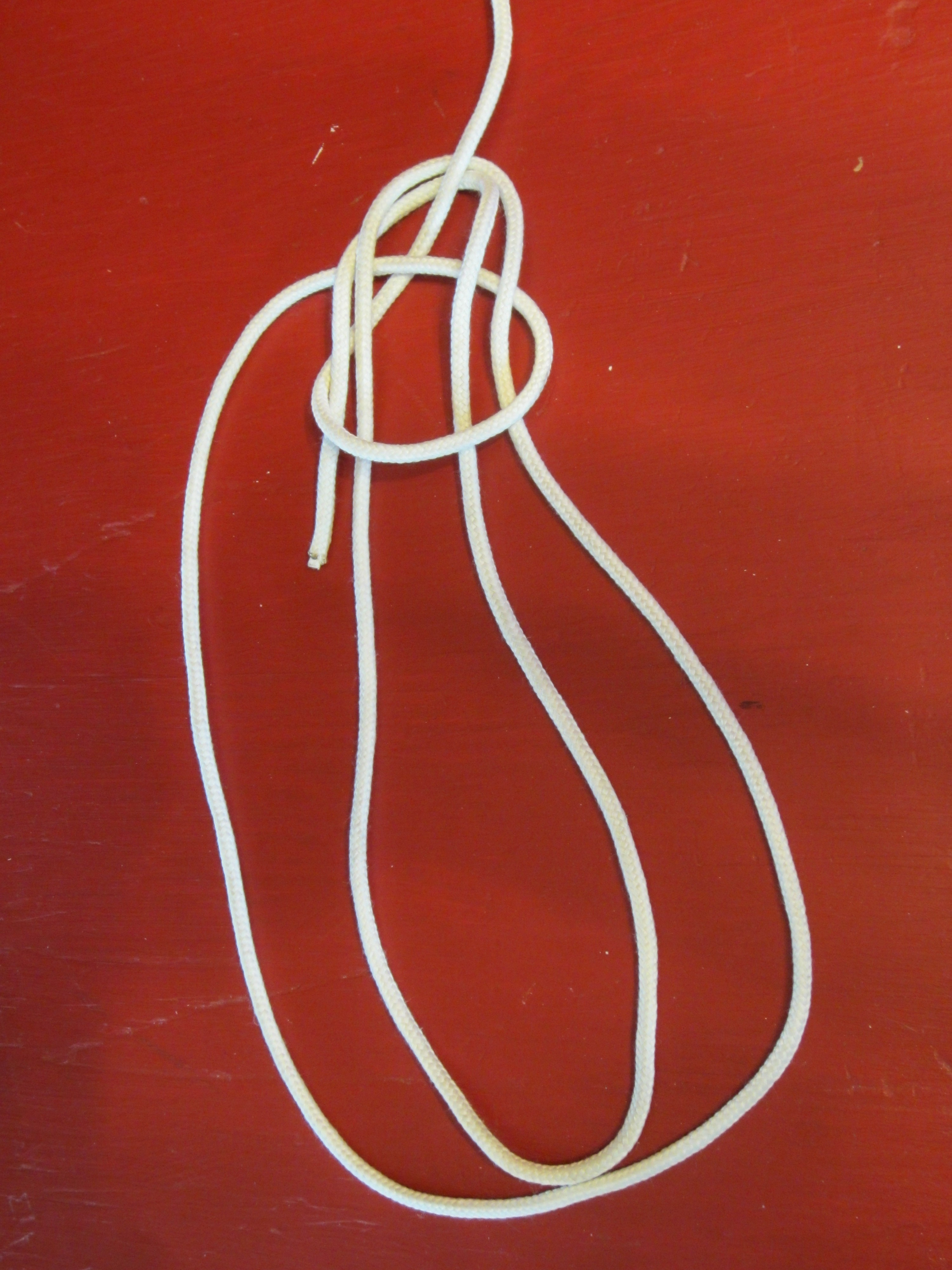
Two-loop Birmingham bowline before tightening and dressing the knot. Two turns taken around the standing part of the line form two loops.

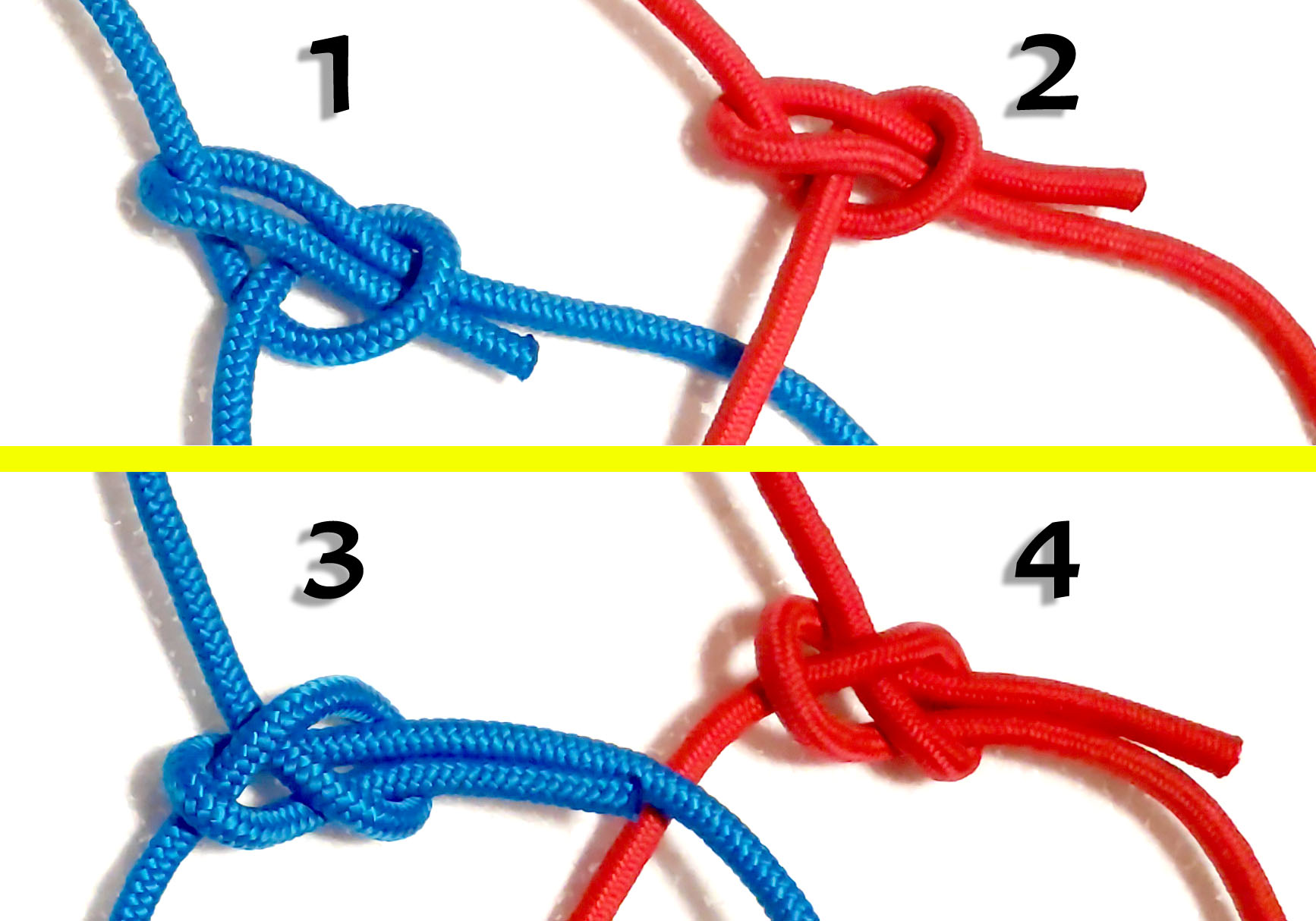
Variants:
1. Bowline
2. Cowboy bowline
3. Eskimo bowline
4. Left-hand Eskimo bowline

If a bowline is tied and the two free ends of the rope are brought together in the simplest way, the mathematical knot obtained is the so-called 6₂ knot. The sequence of necessary moves is depicted here.

== See also ==
- List of knots
- Karash double loop
- Eye splice
- Bowline on a bight
