= Ossel hitch =

Type of knot

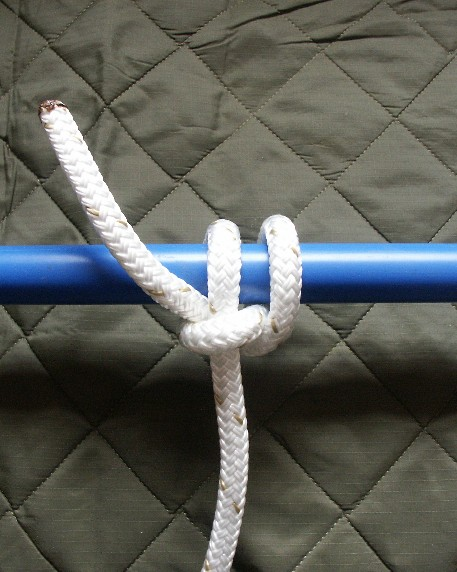
- Category: Hitch
- Related: clove hitch, ground-line hitch, snuggle hitch, Munter hitch

The ossel hitch is a knot used to attach a rope or line to an object. It was originally used on Scottish gill nets to tie small line to larger rope that supported the net. Ossel is actually the Scottish word for "gill net" and for the line attaching the net to the float rope.

Rather, the ossel hitch works only on objects that are approximately the same diameter as the line, as the tail must be nipped under the initial turn, which if made on a larger object will have a gap between line and object.

To what extent the true history of this knot can be learned is a matter of speculation; knots books are notoriously inaccurate. Examination of such "snood"/"gangion" hitches in commercial fishing in the present day will show that it is typical to tuck the hitching line (the snood) through the lay of the object line – which implies that braided lines are not used here. In such cases, various simple hitches – e.g., the clove hitch, the ground line hitch – can be used, with the tucked tail providing security of the knot against both loosening and shifting position along the line. In some areas, lobster fishing is done with long ground lines to which numerous lobster pots are connected via approximately 10'-long snoods. It is possible that the ground line will at times be hauled up from different ends, so hitches might need to endure pulls from either direction.

== Tying ==
Place a turn around the rope or spar and come up to the left of the standing part of the line. Cross over the standing part and make a turn around the rope or spar in the opposite direction. Finally, pass the working end over the second turn and tuck it under the first turn. Set the knot and tighten the knot.

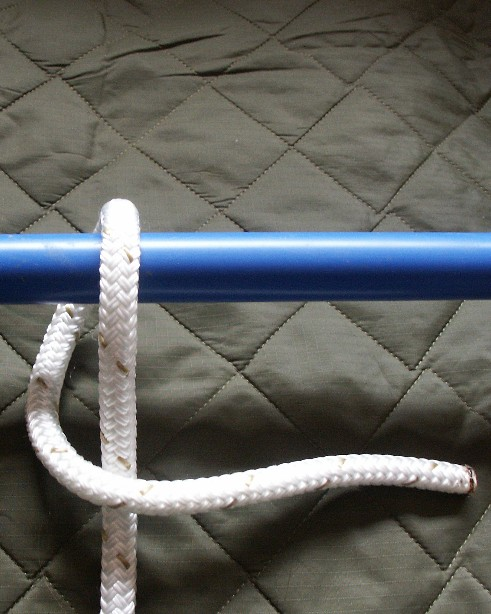
1. Turn and cross over...

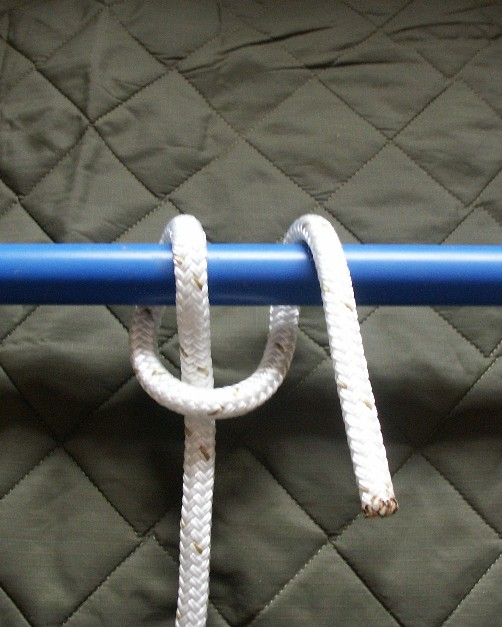
2. Turn in opposite direction...

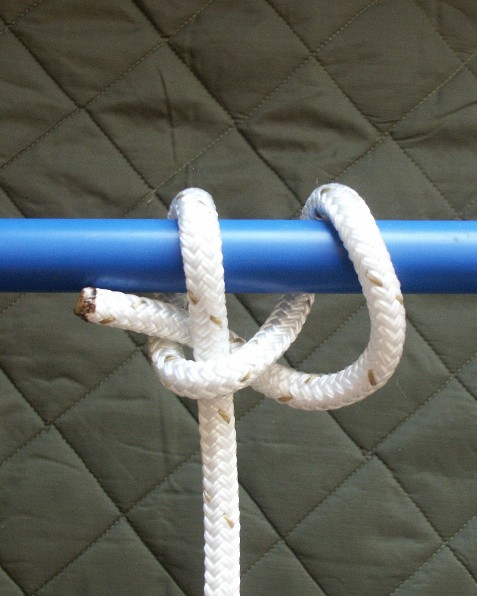
3. Tuck behind 2nd turn, through 1st...

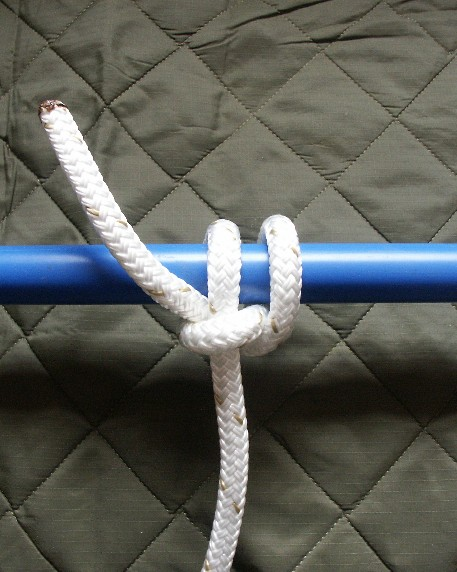
4. Completed Ossel hitch.

== See also ==
- List of knots
