= Vibration-proof hitch =

Type of knot

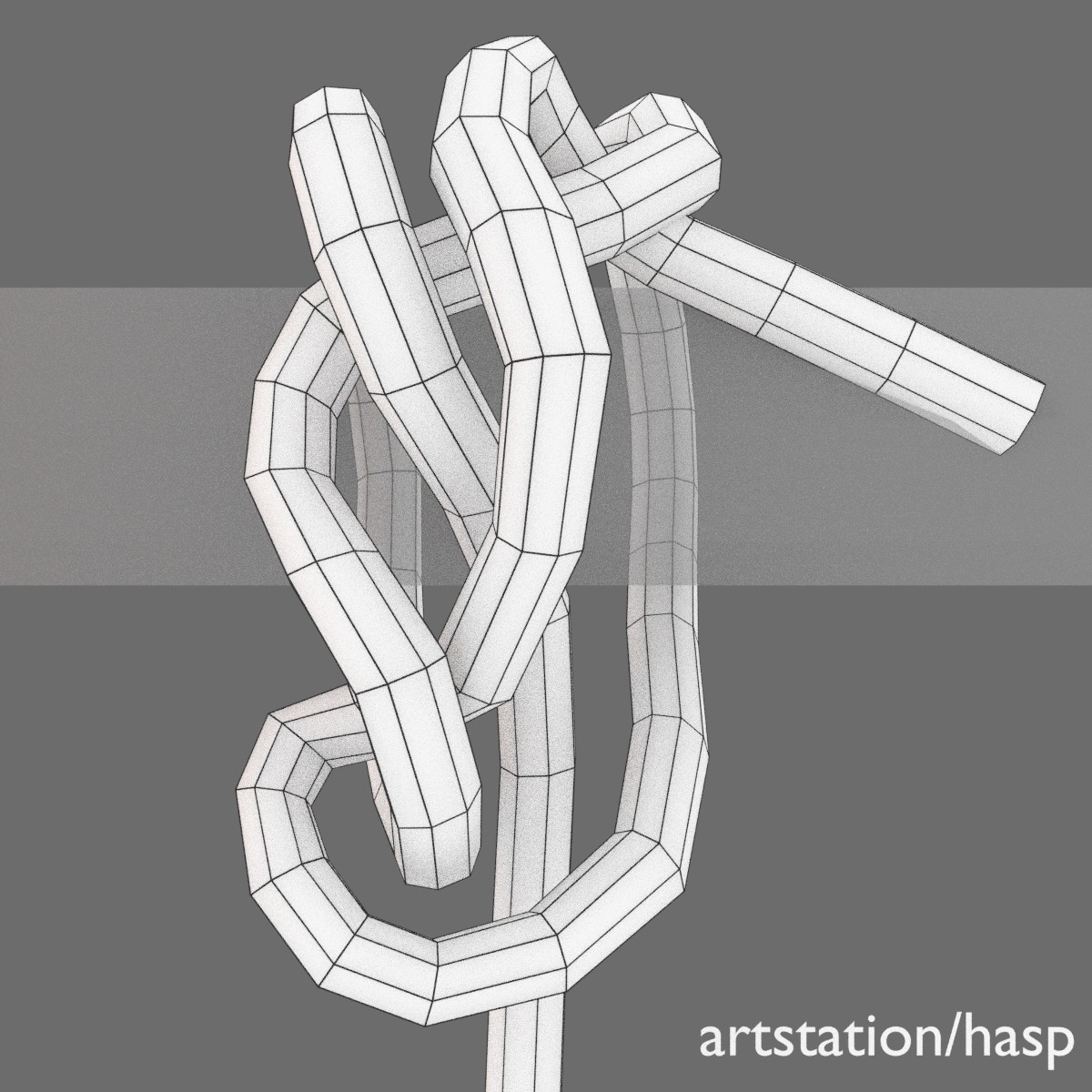
- Category: Hitch
- Related: Clove hitch, Ground-line hitch, Snuggle hitch

The vibration-proof hitch is a knot used for fastening a line or rope to a solid object. This particular hitch is designed to tighten when subjected to vibration and functions best when the object is fairly large compared to the diameter of the rope. Knot expert Geoffrey Budworth credits the knot to Amory Bloch Lovins.

== See also ==
- List of knots
