= Miller's knot =

Type of knot

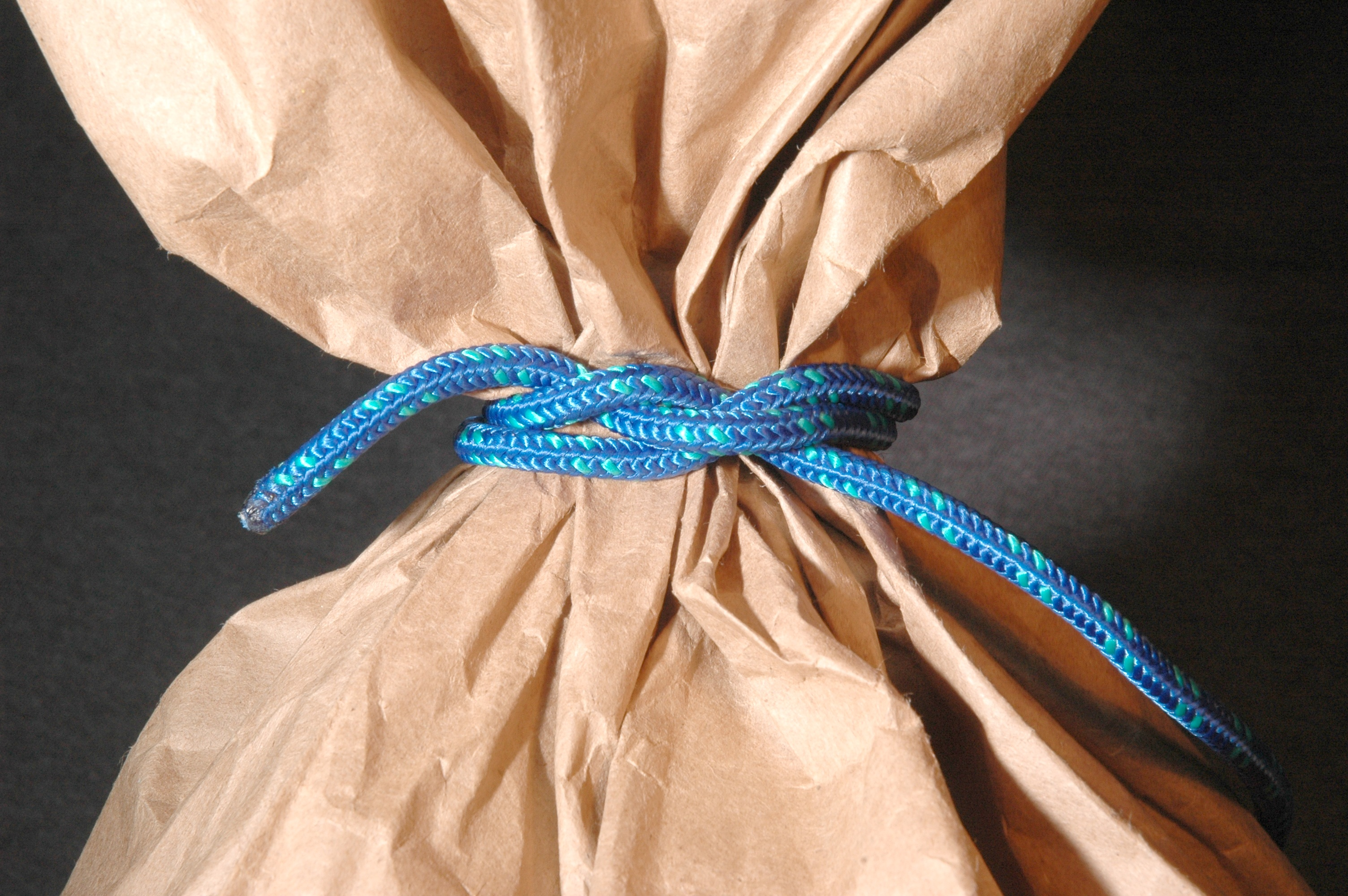
- ABoK #1241 around the neck of a paper bag
- Names: Miller's knot, sack knot, bag knot
- Category: Binding
- Related: Ground-line hitch, constrictor knot, strangle knot, clove hitch, Bottle sling
- ABoK: #388, #389, #390, #1241, #1242, #1243, #1244, #1674, #2007, #2186, #2300, #2554

A miller's knot (also sack knot or bag knot) is a binding knot used to secure the opening of a sack or bag. Historically, large sacks often contained grains; thus the association of these knots with the miller's trade. Several knots are known interchangeably by these three names.

== Variations ==
Several other distinct knots have historically been known as miller's, sack, or bag knots; namely ABOK-1241, ABOK-1242, ABOK-1243 (ground-line hitch), ABOK-1674, ABOK-11 and their slipped versions. These fit the short description "two crossing turns – ends tucked under".

The following 3 knots do not fit the simple "two crossing turns – ends tucked under" definition but are very secure:

- A slipped constrictor knot where the ends are passed through the opposing slips for security is quite secure as a bag knot. Unslipped, it is even more secure, but it may have to be cut at the bridge to open the bag.
- A slipped strangle knot where the ends are passed through the opposing slips for security is also quite secure as a bag knot.
- A bottle sling around a swirled and folded neck of the bag (elbow of the neck) is also a very solid and reliable bag knot. The fold provides the slight bulge a bottle sling needs for a secure hold. The bag may be hanged fully loaded by the ends of the bottle sling tied together.

Constrictor knot makes a fiercer binding knot, but miller's knot is suitable for most applications, and is easier to tie and untie. Miller's knot makes a great hitch, like the similar ground line hitch. Binding usage has force emanating from inside rope ring evenly, hitch usage has force input from one side, then reducing around.

== Tying ==
The common aspects of the most common bag knots are two crossing turns, and both ends tucked under some turns near the crossing point. Two ends, and two turns one can tuck under, gives a limited number of alternatives. All of these knots can also be made in a slipped form by starting with a bight and/or by completing the final tuck with a bight instead of the end.

To avoid ambiguity, versions of these knots that are not slipped are pictured below with the reference numbers found in The Ashley Book of Knots.

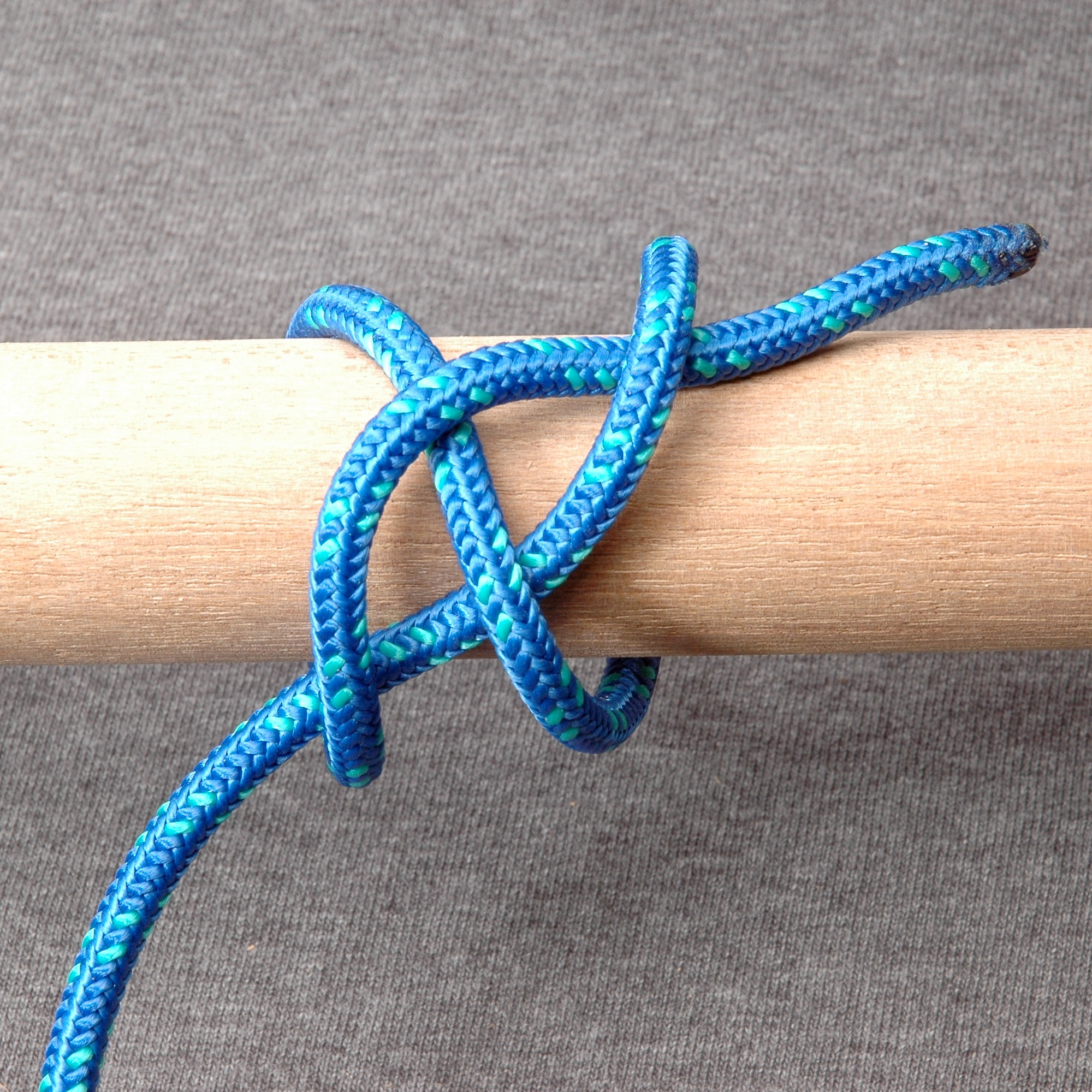
4 - ABOK #1241

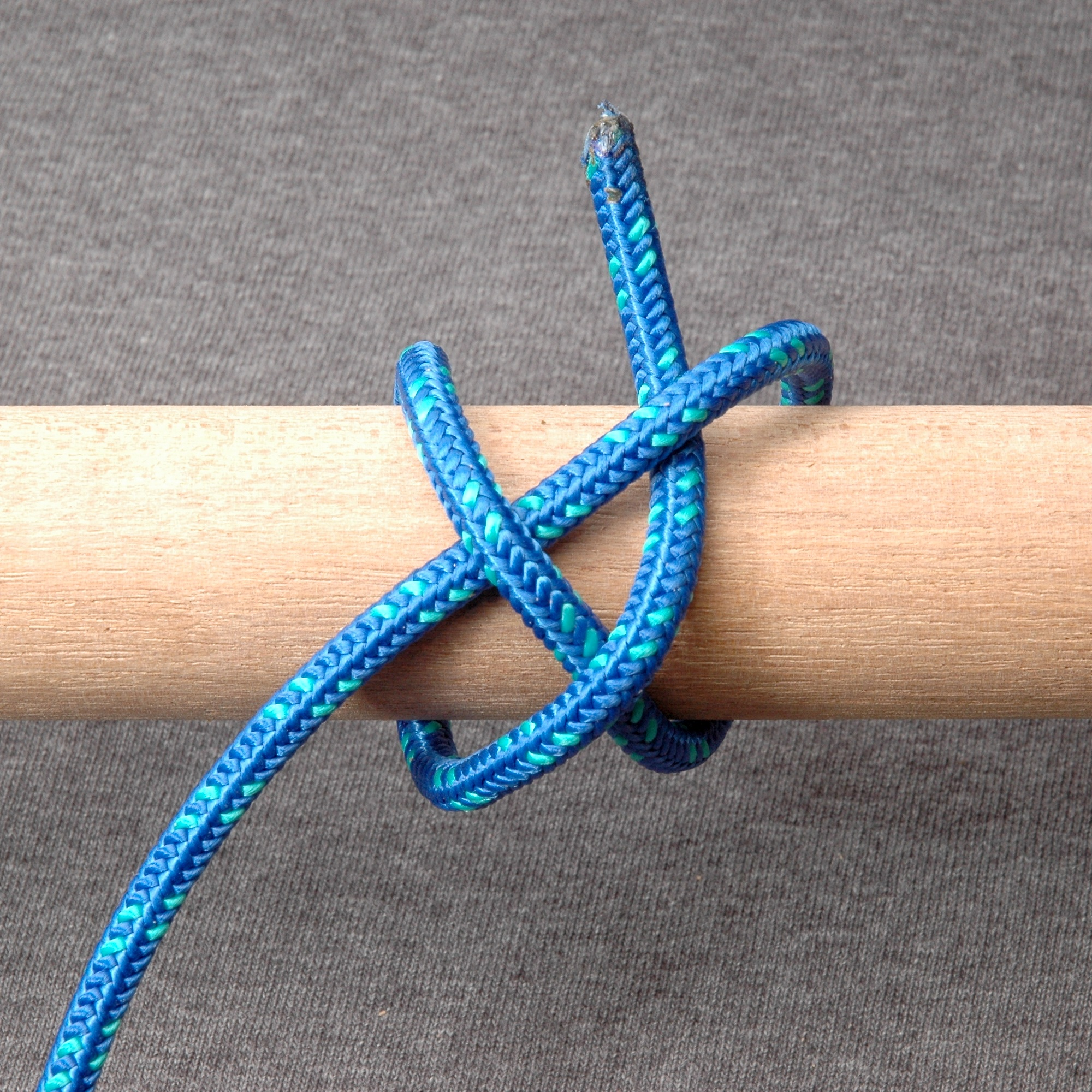
2 - ABOK #1242

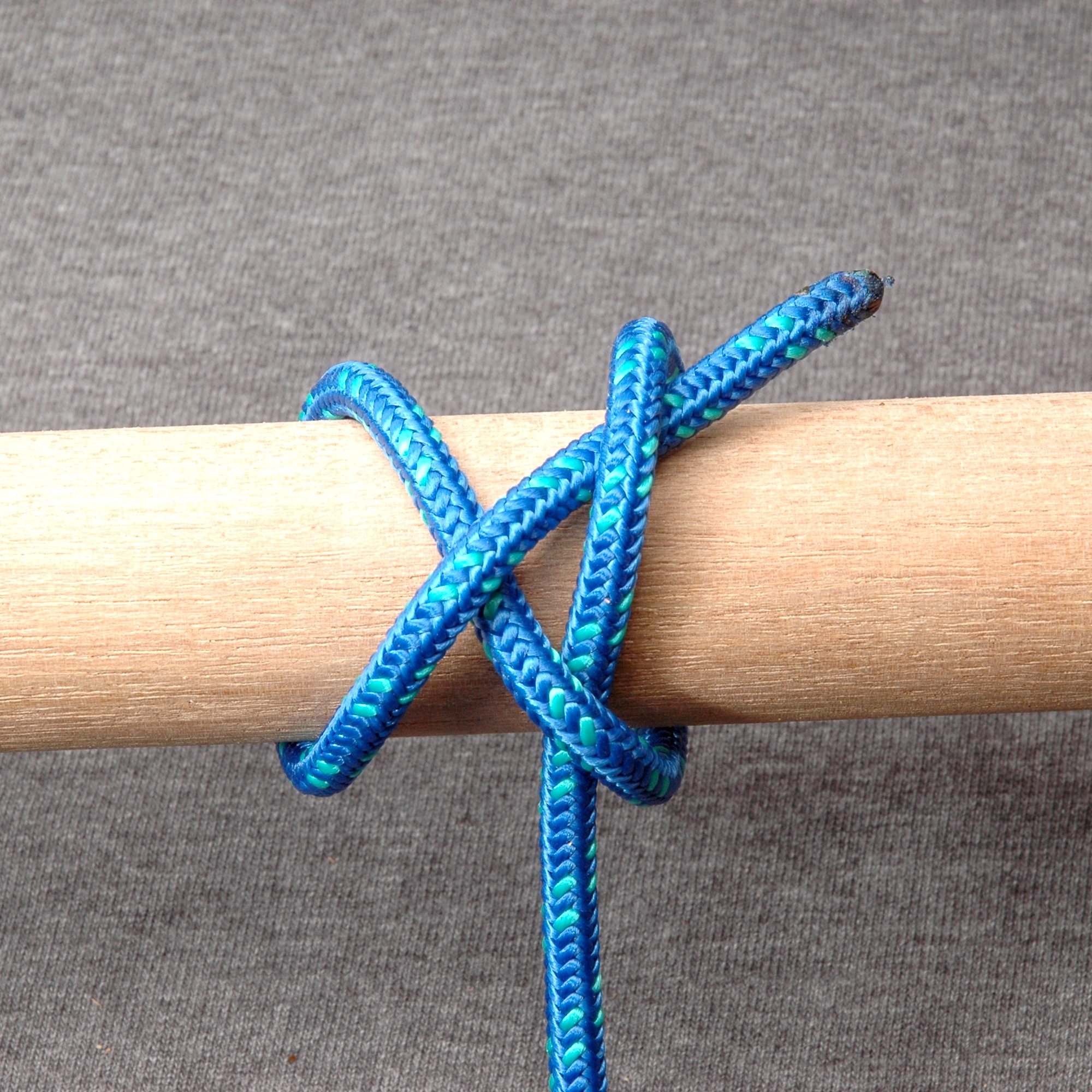
3 - ABOK #1243 or spar hitch or ground-line hitch

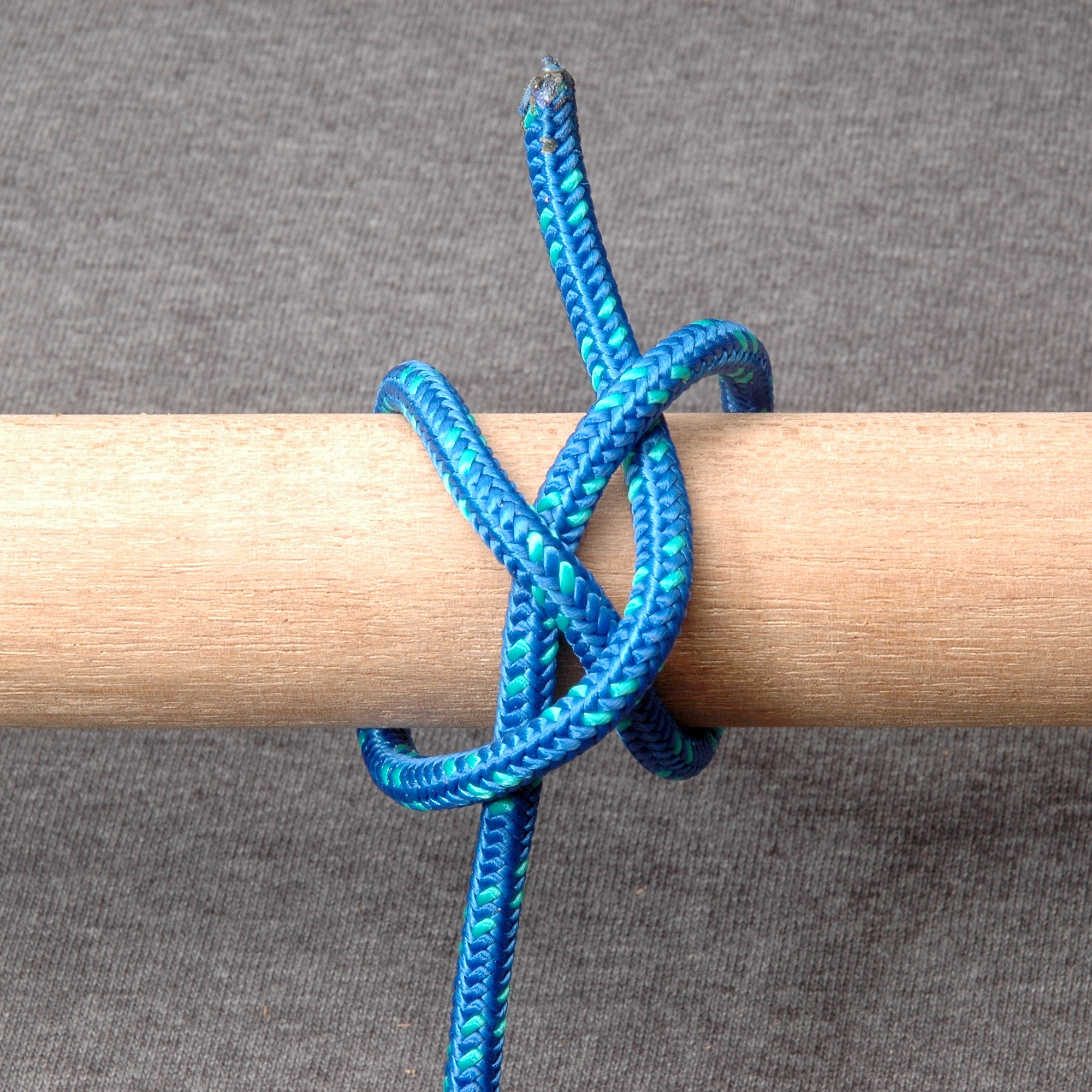
5 - ABOK #1674 (slipped: ABOK #1244)

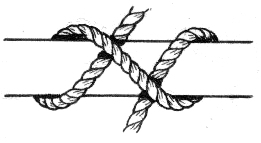
6 - ABOK #11 or clove hitch

1 - ABOK #176 or constrictor knot

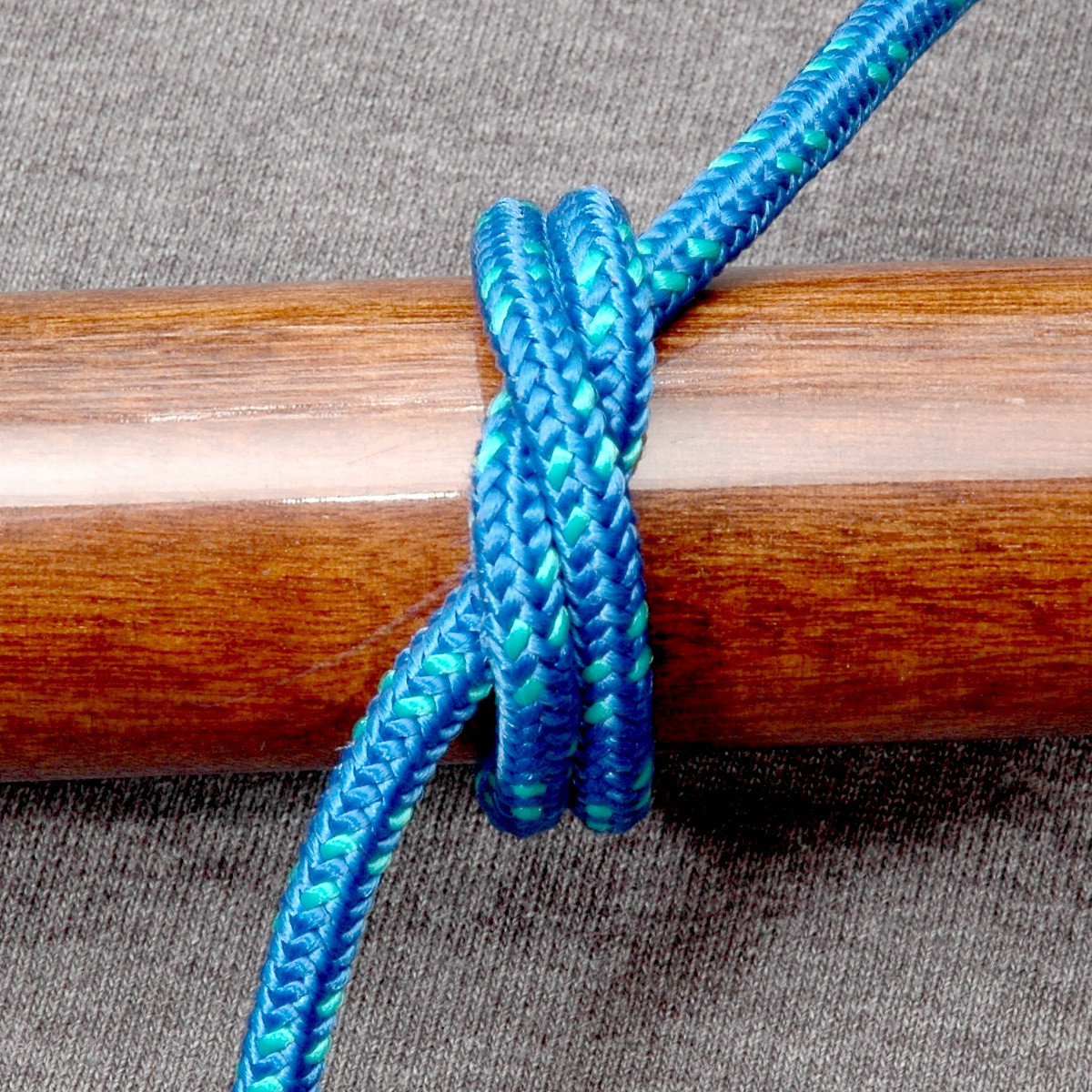
7 - ABOK #1239 or strangle knot

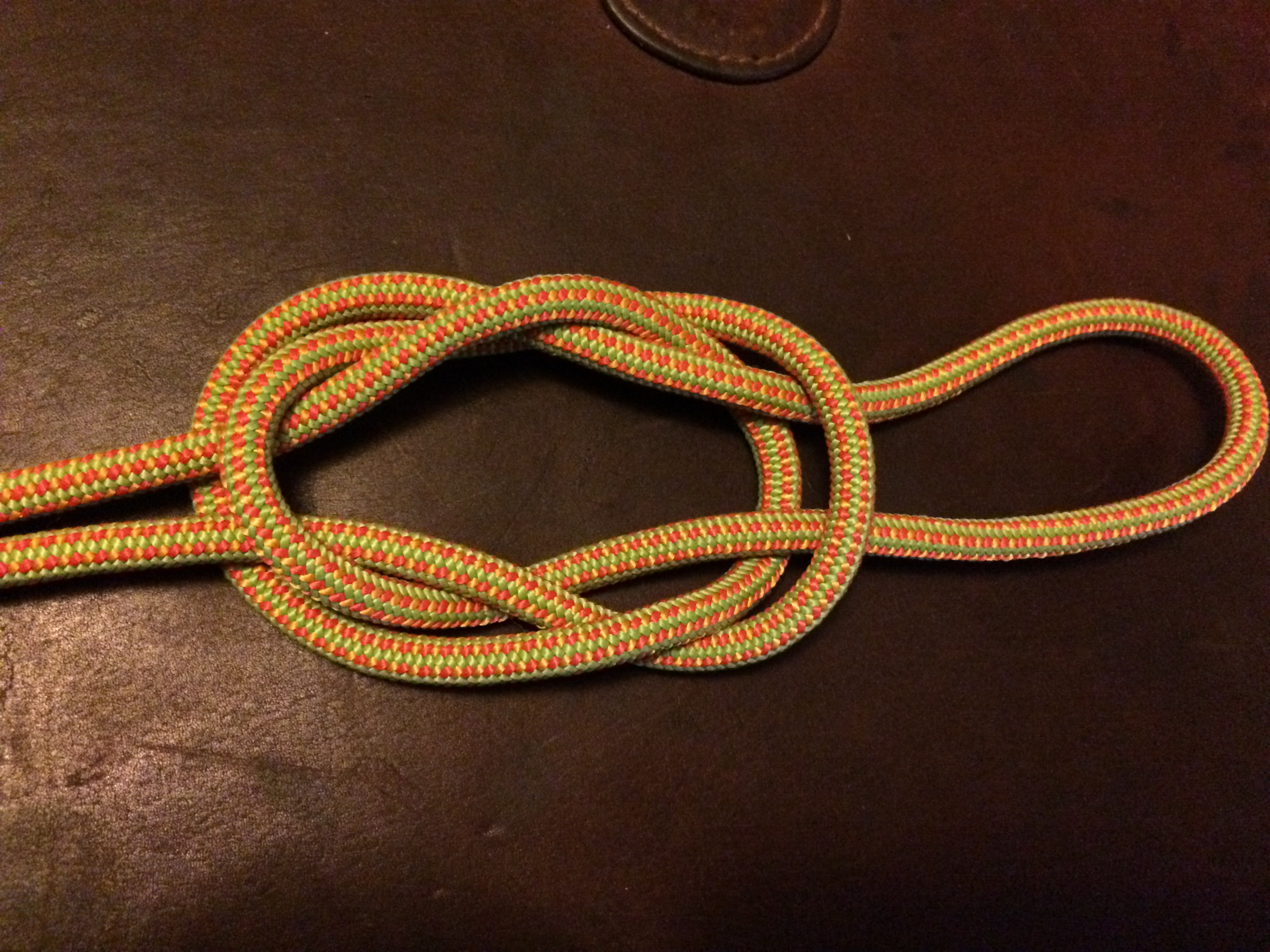
8 - ABOK #1142 or bottle sling

This is to tie a constrictor knot version of the miller's knot:

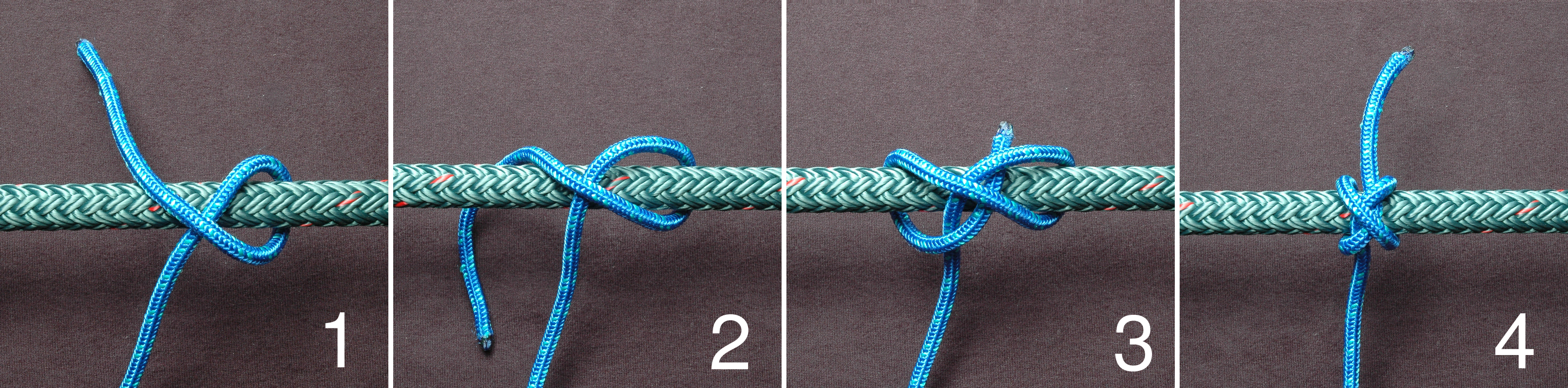
1 Constrictor knot

1. Grip the neck of the bag with the left hand,
2. Fix / immobilize one end of the rope tucked upwards over the left hand long finger and under the index finger (option 1 : double folded as a bight to prepare a start-side-slip for the final knot)
3. Make two crossing turns around the neck of the bag. Detailed steps:
  1. Cross over the hand downwards and take one turn around (front, then back) the neck of the bag at the sack side of the hand (under the hand)
  2. Cross over the hand upwards as well as over the immobilized other end,
  3. Take a second turn around the neck of the bag at the opening side of the hand (over the hand)
4. Cross over the immobilized other end of the rope, then cross back tucking under the crossing point of step 3.2 (of the immobilized other end, and the part between the two turns), (option 2 : this last tuck with a bight instead of the end as an end-side-slip for the final knot).

To tie the other variants:

1. If at the last step one chooses not to cross the immobilized other end and tuck only inwards under the part between the two turns, the knot will be an ABoK #11 or clove hitch.
2. If at the last step one chooses to cross the immobilized other end and tuck only under the part between the two turns, the knot will be an ABoK #1242 (tuck inwards)
3. or a ground-line hitch (ABoK #1243 - tuck outwards) pictured. It should be tightened by pulling the end first. It is also called spar hitch
4. If at the last step one chooses to cross over the crossing point, and then tuck outwards under the first turn, the knot will be an ABoK #1241 pictured.
5. If at the last step one chooses to cross over the crossing point, and then tuck inwards under the first turn, the knot will be an ABoK #1674 pictured. Shown in a slipped form at entry #1244, this variation is noted by Ashley as having better binding characteristics than the others.

Tying other knots that also may function very well as a bag knot but are slightly different from above descriptions:

1. Strangle knot (two non crossing turns with one end crossing over both and tucked under both)
  1. Grip the neck of the bag with the left hand,
  2. Fix / immobilize one end of the rope tucked upwards over the left hand long and under the index finger (option 1 : double folded as a bight to prepare a start-side-slip for the final knot)
  3. Make two parallel turns around the neck of the bag. Detailed steps:
    1. Cross over the hand downwards and take one turn around (front, then back) the neck of the bag first at the sack side of the hand (under the hand), then over the hand and behind the immobilized other end.
    2. Take another turn crossing over the immobilized other end, crossing downwards over the hand around (front, then back) the neck of the bag parallel to the first turn
  4. Cross over the immobilized other end of the rope, then cross back tucking under both turns, (option 2 : this last tuck with a bight instead of the end as an end-side-slip for the final knot).
2. Bottle sling (sides of a bight form one turn each, pleat between all 4 enter and exit points inside of two turns)
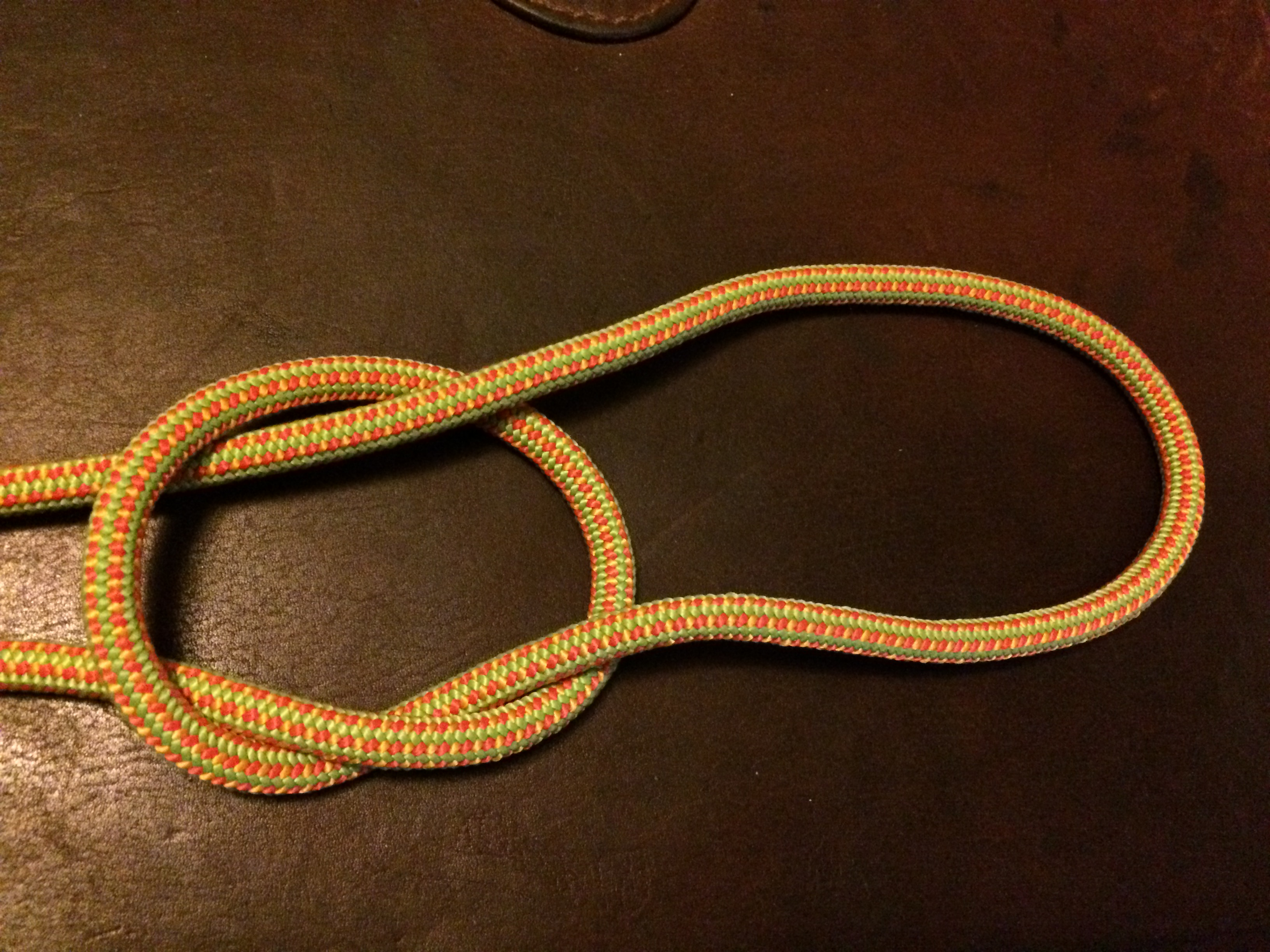
8-1- For ABOK #1142 bottle sling start with an overhand knot pulled to a slip knot

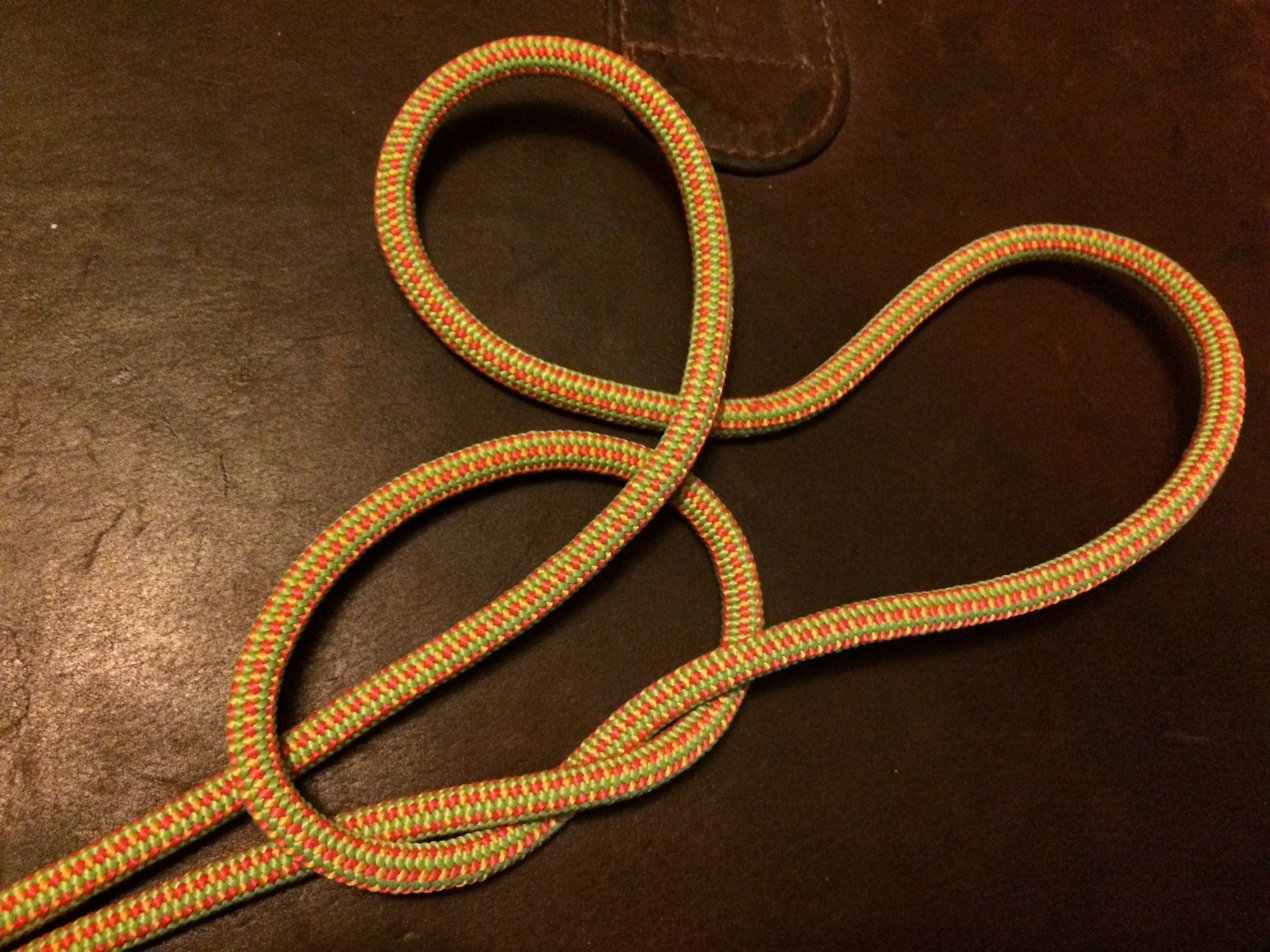
8-2-The end side of the slip is folded into a loop with end side up

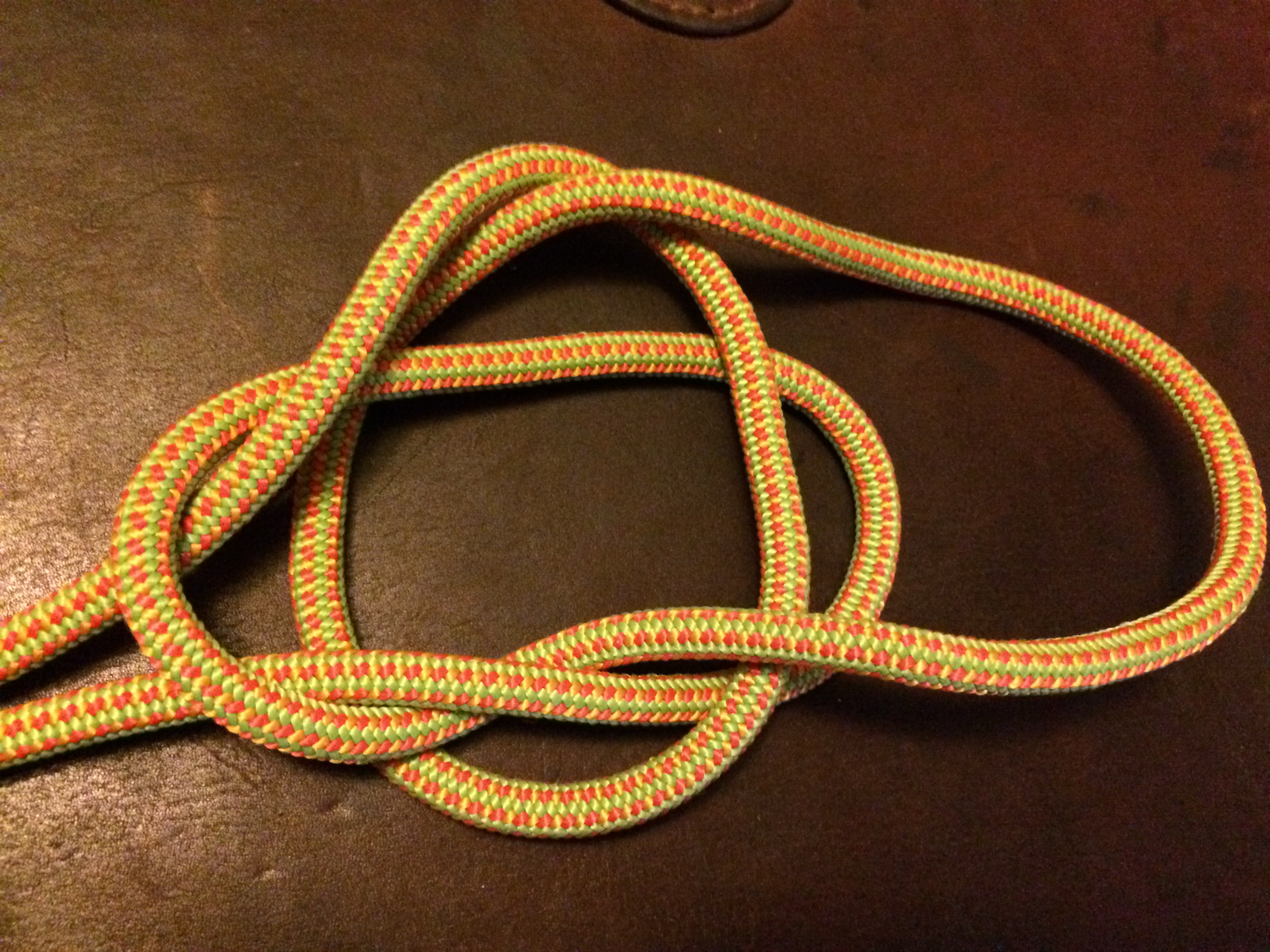
8-3-The resulting loop is folded under and the slip side of the overhand knot pulled through it

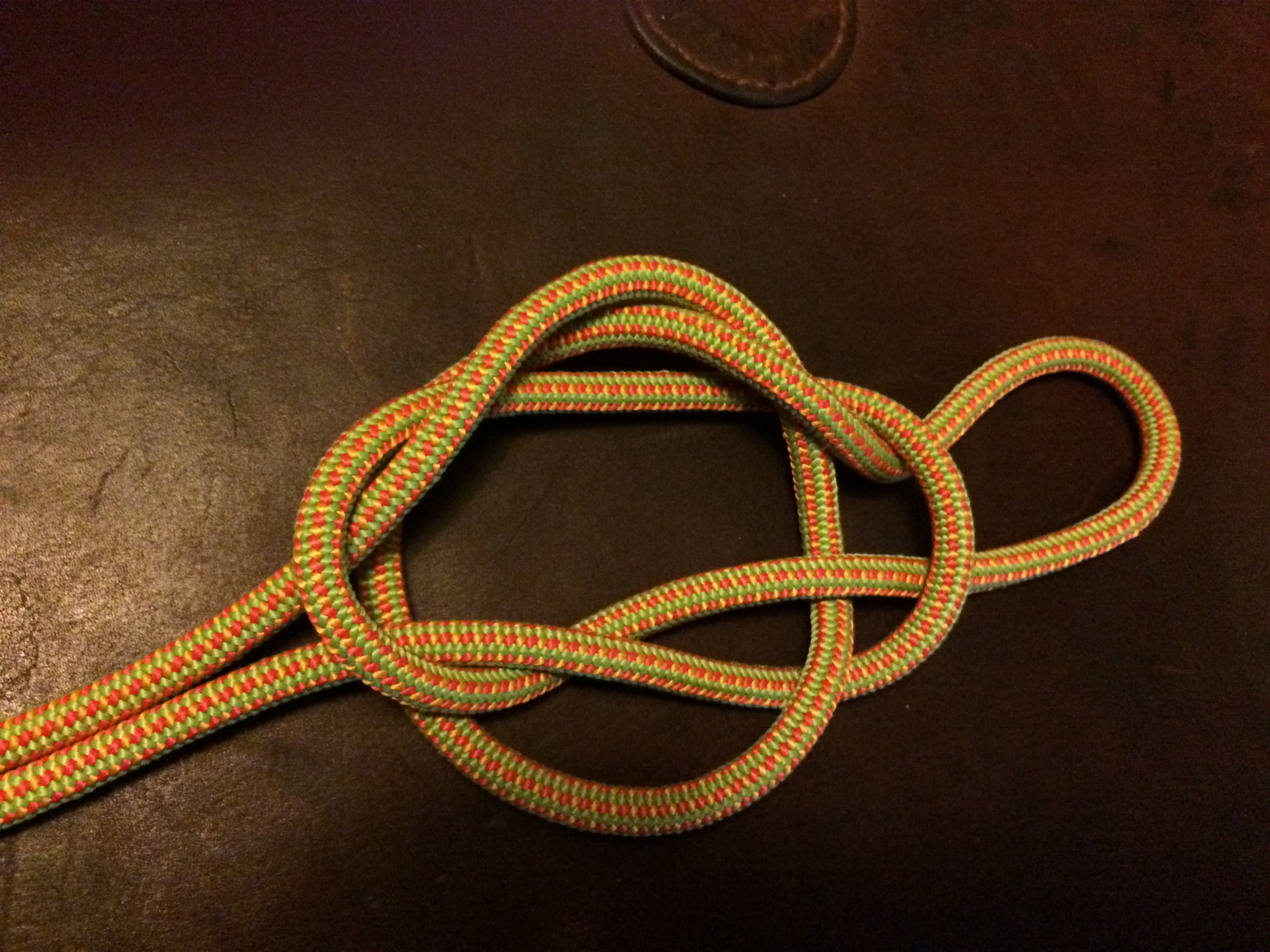
8-4-The remaining slip is passed over the loop and under the knot bight pulled through the loop

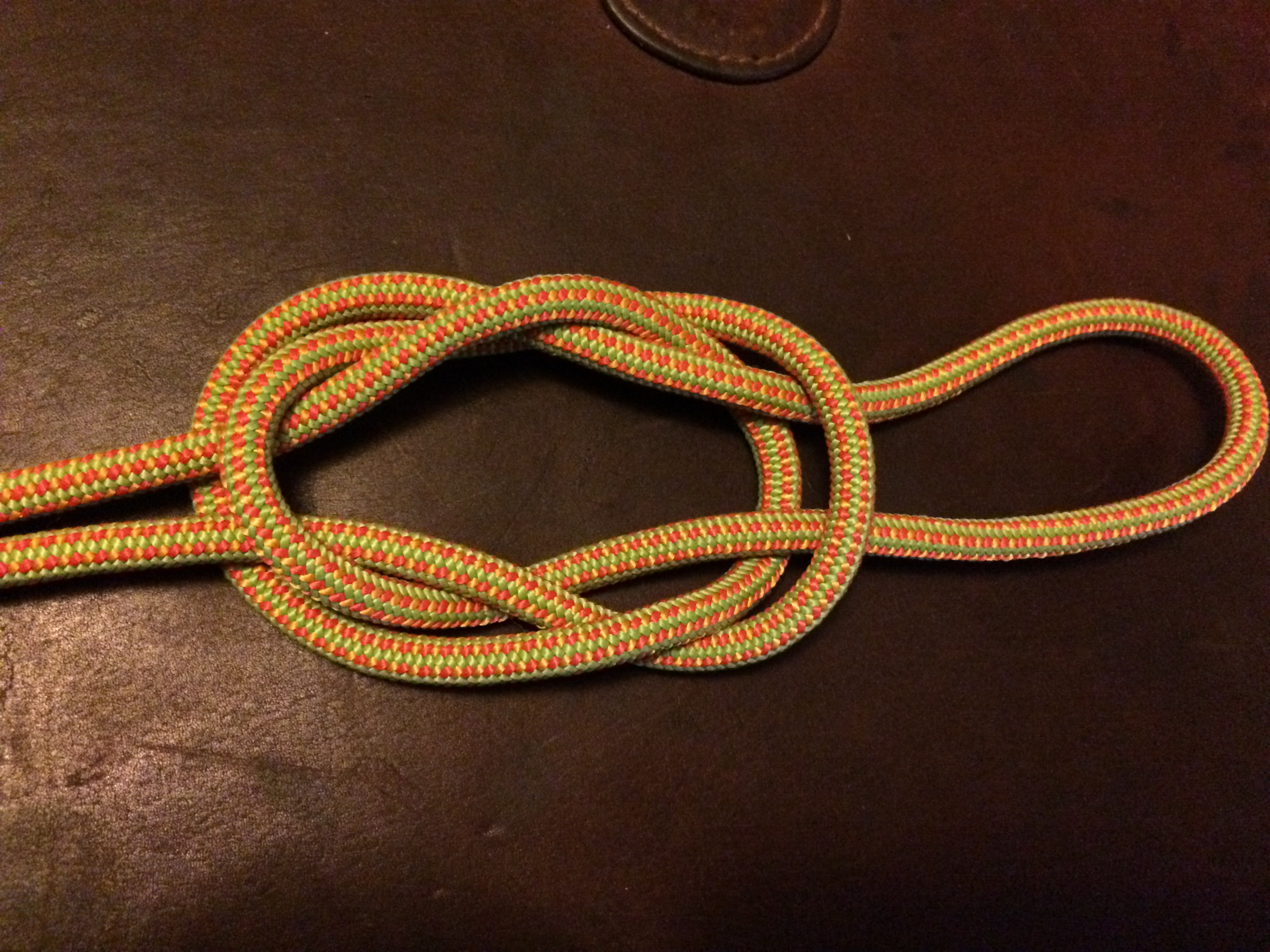
8-5-The hole in the middle ready to be slipped over the swirled and double folded bag mouth, and tightened

== See also ==
- List of binding knots
- List of knots
