= Ground-line hitch =

Type of knot

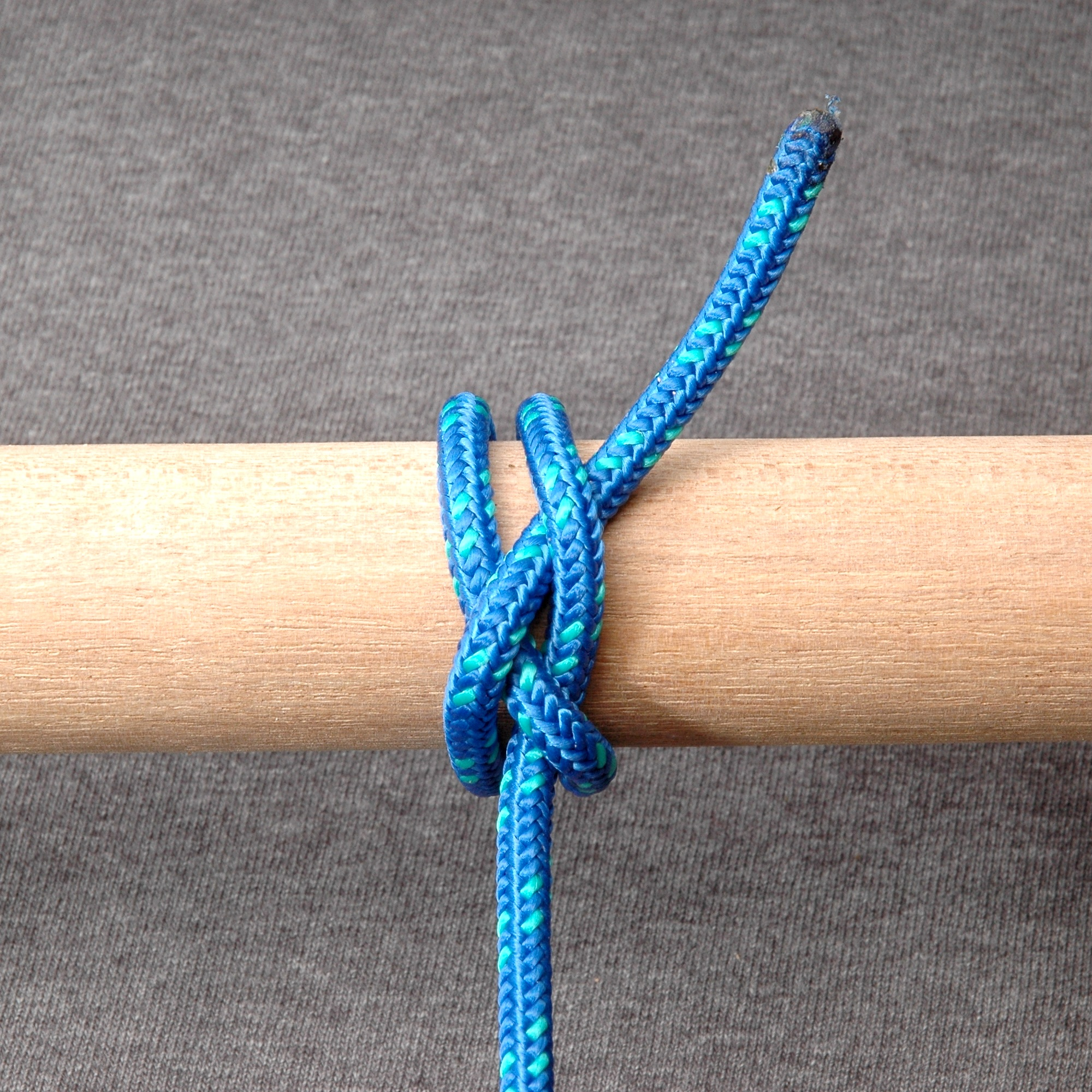
- Names: Ground-line hitch, picket-line hitch, miller's knot, sack knot, bag knot
- Category: Hitch
- Category 2: Binding
- Related: Miller's knot, clove hitch, snuggle hitch, ossel hitch, vibration-proof hitch, Turk's head
- Releasing: Non-jamming
- ABoK: #154, #277, #278, #390, #1243, #1676, #1680

The ground-line hitch is a type of knot used to attach a rope to an object. Worked-up and dressed properly, it is more secure than the simpler clove hitch and has less tendency to jam, but does not respond well to swinging. It can also be used as a simple binding knot and is classed among several knots known as the miller's knot. The Ground-line hitch is also the start of a three-lead four-bight Turk's head.

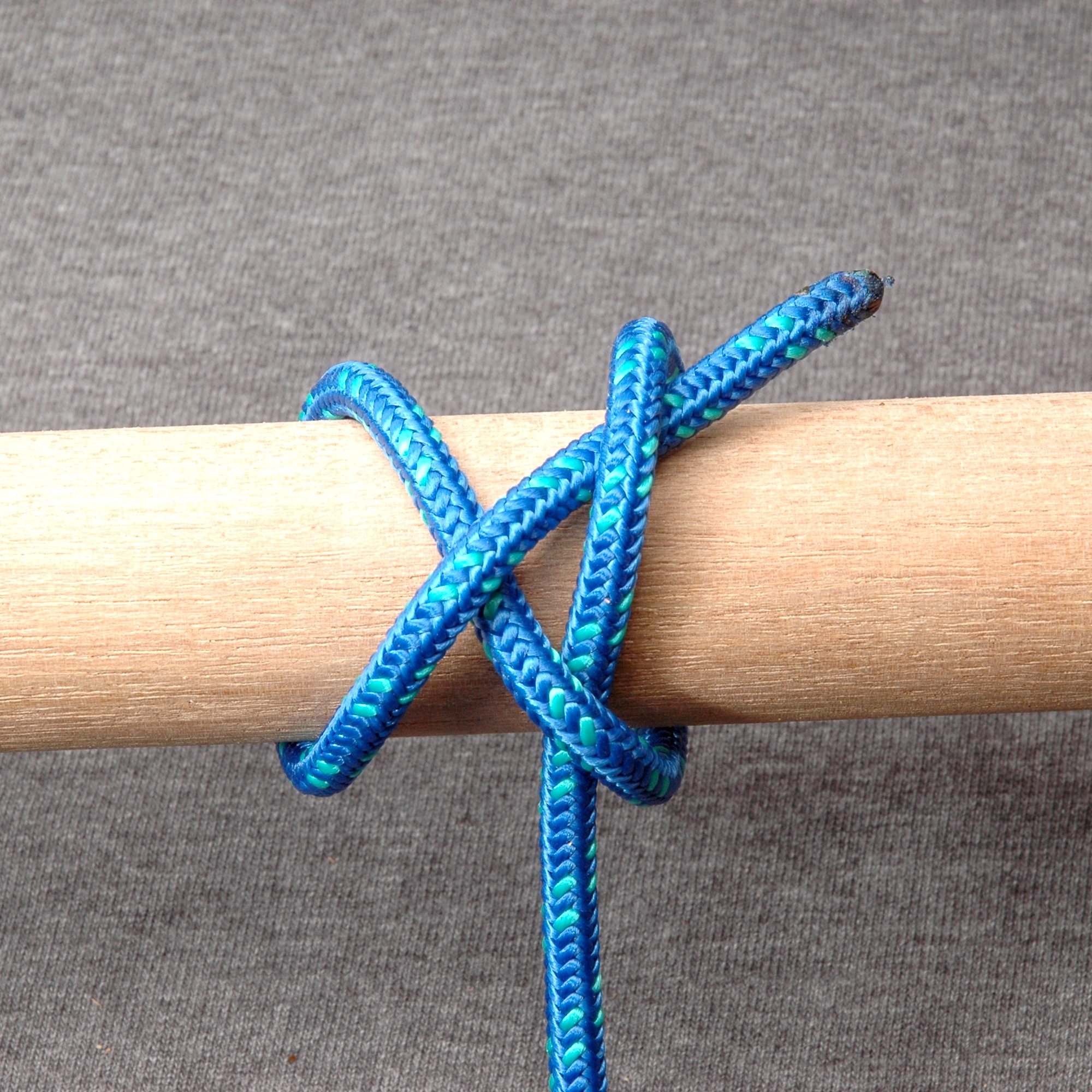
Untightened ground-line hitch

The knot is named for its use to attach a net to the groundline, a weighted or lead cored rope on the bottom of the net (especially a gillnet).

== See also ==
- List of binding knots
- List of knots
