= Clove hitch =

Type of knot

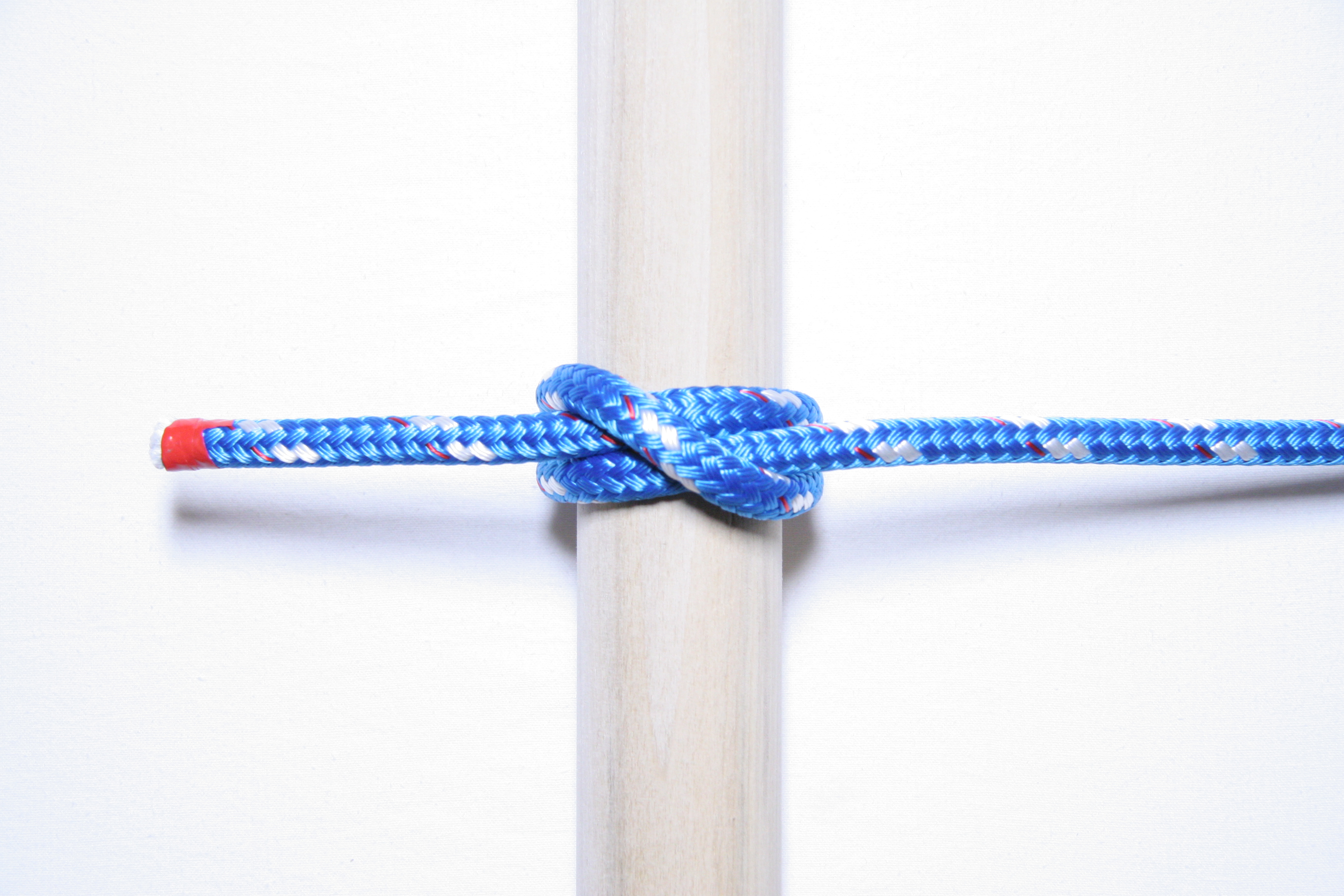
- Category: Hitch
- Origin: Ancient
- Related: Slippery hitch, Two half-hitches, Buntline hitch, Cow hitch, Constrictor knot, Ground-line hitch, Lashings, Snuggle hitch, Distel hitch
- Typical use: Securing lines running along a series of posts, belaying, starting lashings, weak binding
- Caveat: Can spill if the standing part is pulled forcibly in the wrong direction
- ABoK: #11, #53, #69, #70, #204, #400, #421, #437, #1176, #1177, #1178, #1179, #1180, #1245, #1773, #1774, #1775, #1776, #1778, #1779, #1814, #2079, #2541, #2542, #2543, #2544, #2546, #2547, #2548
- Instructions: https://www.youtube.com/watch?v=pwdZTHu5rTI

The clove hitch is an ancient type of knot, made of two successive single hitches tied around an object. It is most effectively used to secure a middle section of rope to an object it crosses over, such as a line on a fencepost. It can also be used as an ordinary hitch, or as a binding knot, but it is not particularly secure in either application. It is considered one of the most important knots, alongside the bowline and the sheet bend.

Although the name clove hitch is given by Falconer in his Dictionary of 1769, the knot is much older, having been tied in ratlines at least as early as the first quarter of the sixteenth century. This is shown in early sculpture and paintings. A round turn is taken with the ratline and then a hitch is added below. The forward end is always the first to be made fast.

— The Ashley Book of Knots

== Usage ==
This knot is particularly useful where the length of the running end needs to be adjustable, since feeding in rope from either direction will loosen the knot to be tightened at a new position. With certain types of cord, the clove hitch can slip when loaded. In modern climbing rope, the clove hitch will slip to a point, and then stop slipping. When tied around a carabiner, the load should pull on the end closest to its spine. With smaller diameter cords, after being heavily weighted it may become difficult to untie. It is also unreliable when used on a square or rectangular post, rather than round.

The clove hitch is also commonly used in pioneering to start and finish a lashing such as the traditional square lashing, tripod lashing, round lashing and shear lashing.

== Tying ==
The clove hitch is tied by first passing the running end of the rope around the spar and back over itself to form an X. The running end then passes around the spar again, under the intersection of the last two turns, and both ends are pulled tight. There are several methods of tying it using both hands or one hand.

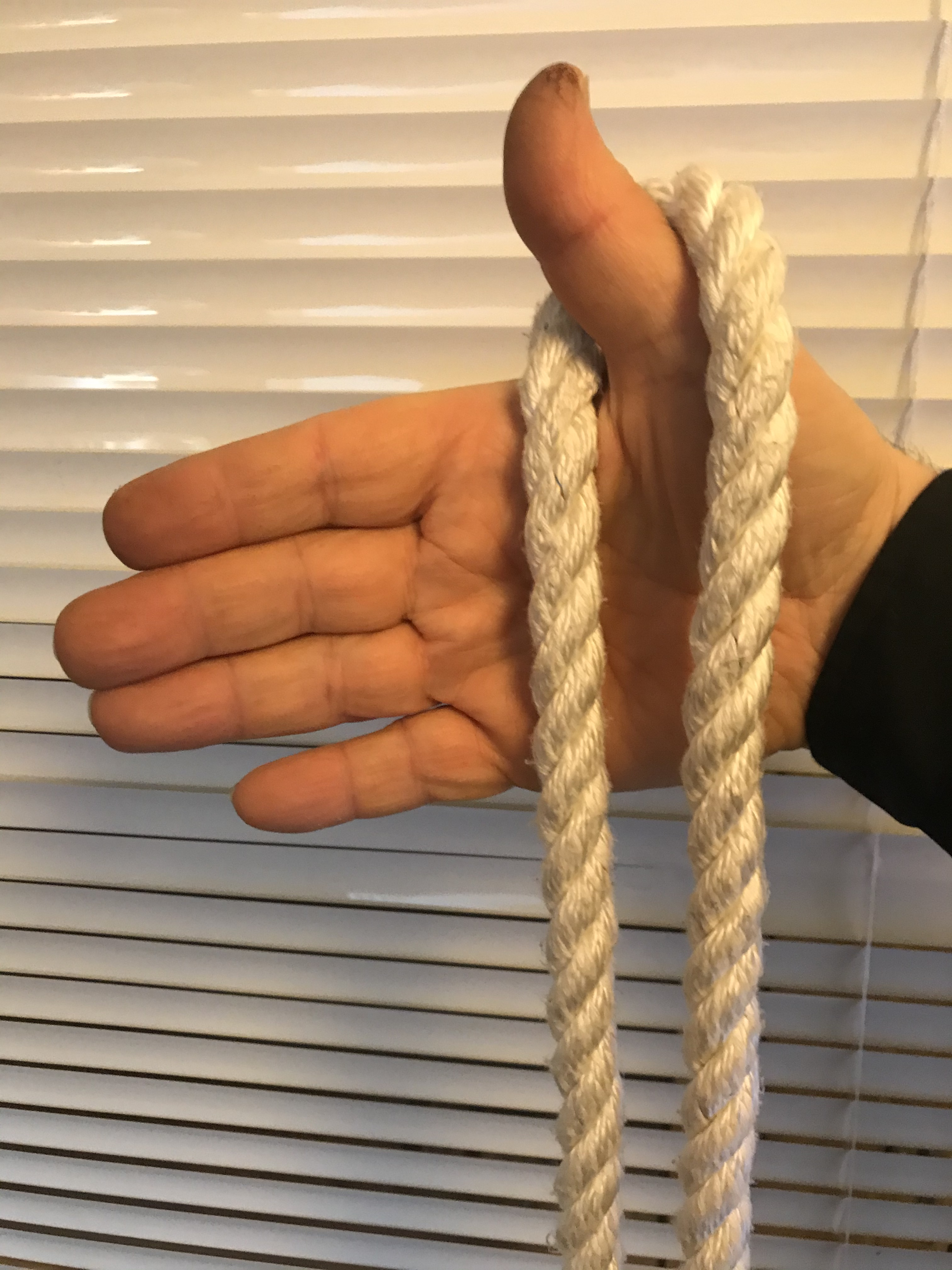
1. The rope hooked by the thumb is let to hang loosely either side.

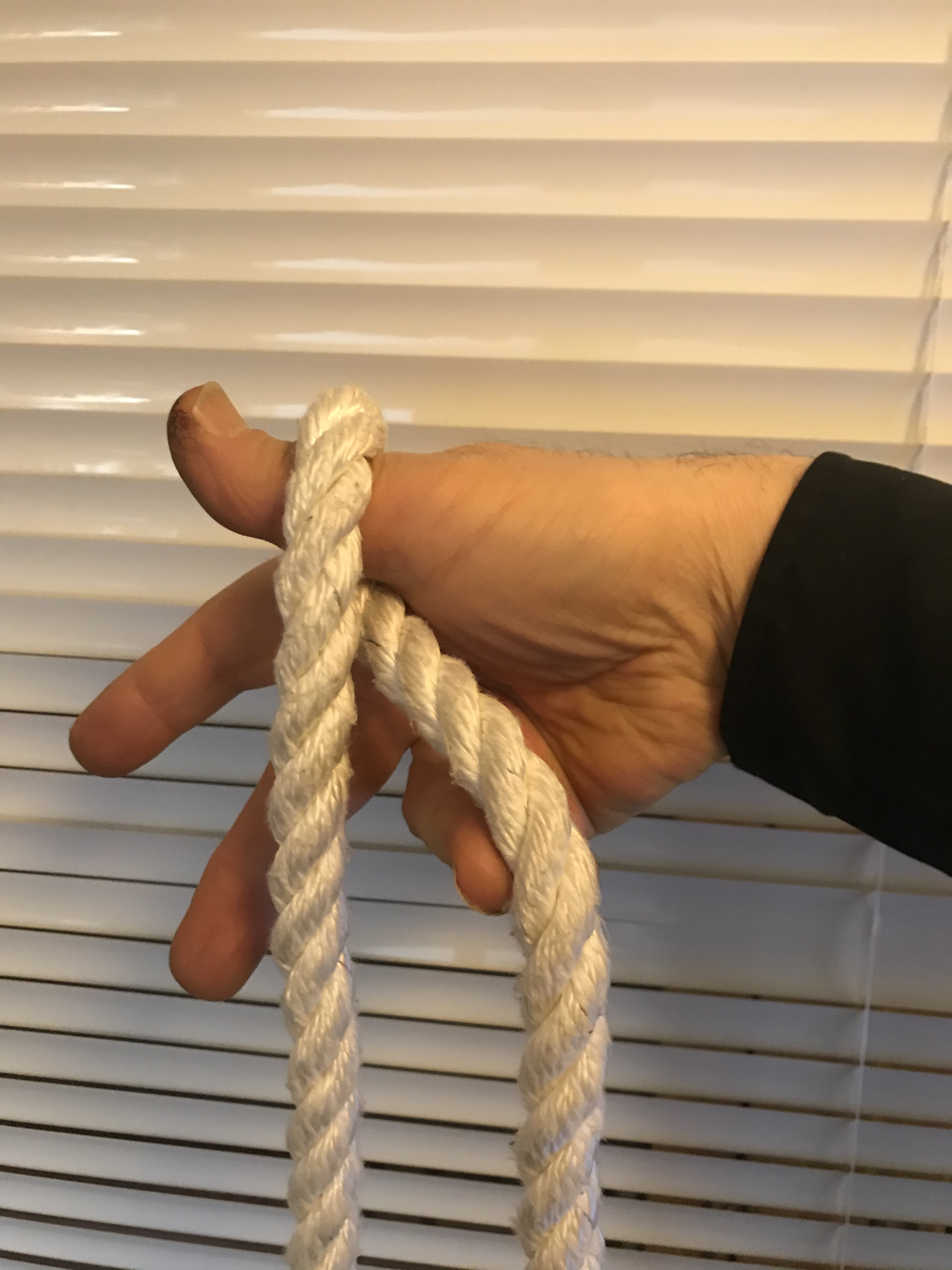
2. The inner rope is pulled back and out using the ring finger.

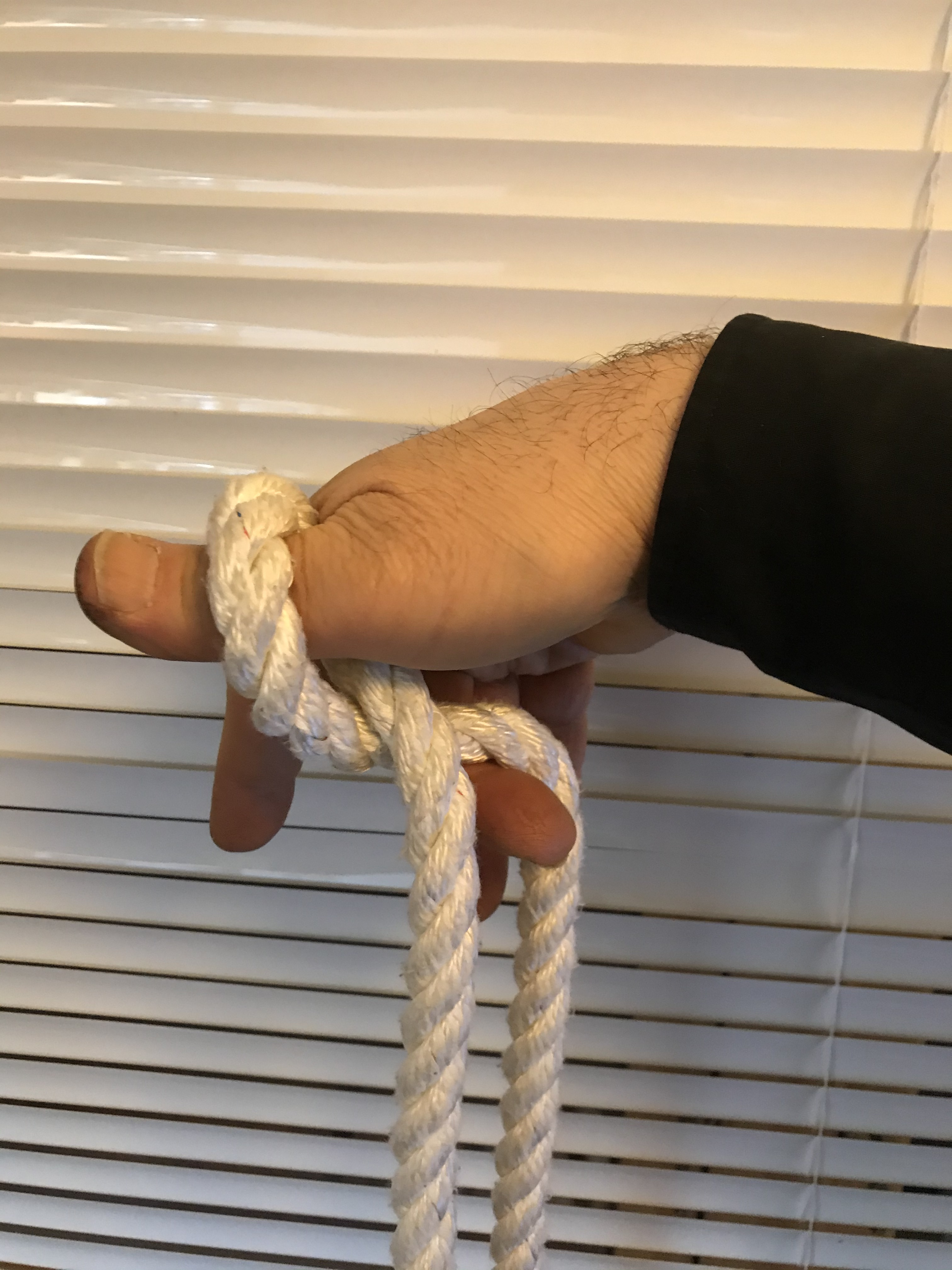
3. The outer rope is pulled in and back using the middle finger.

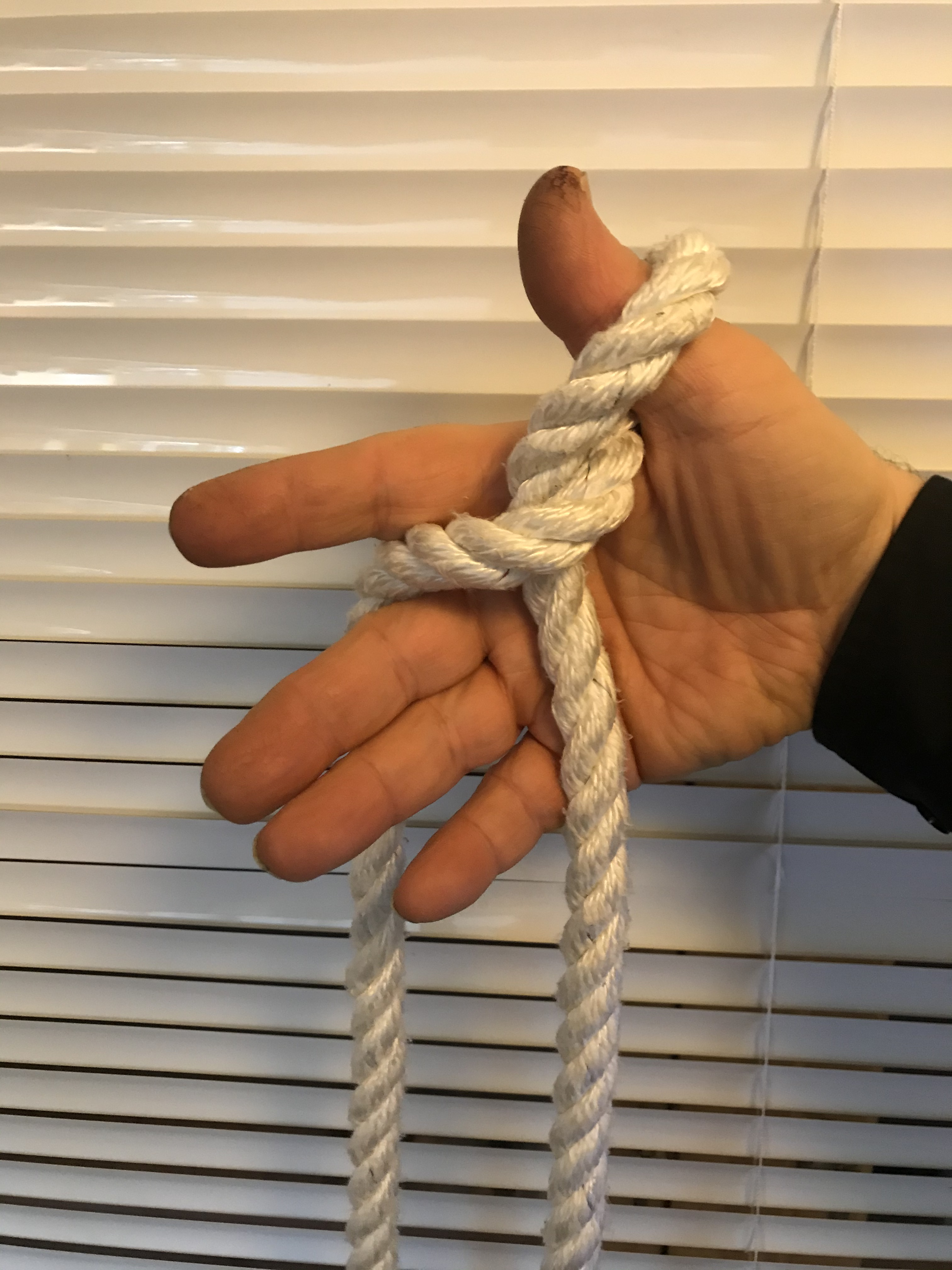
4. The ring and the little finger join the middle finger.

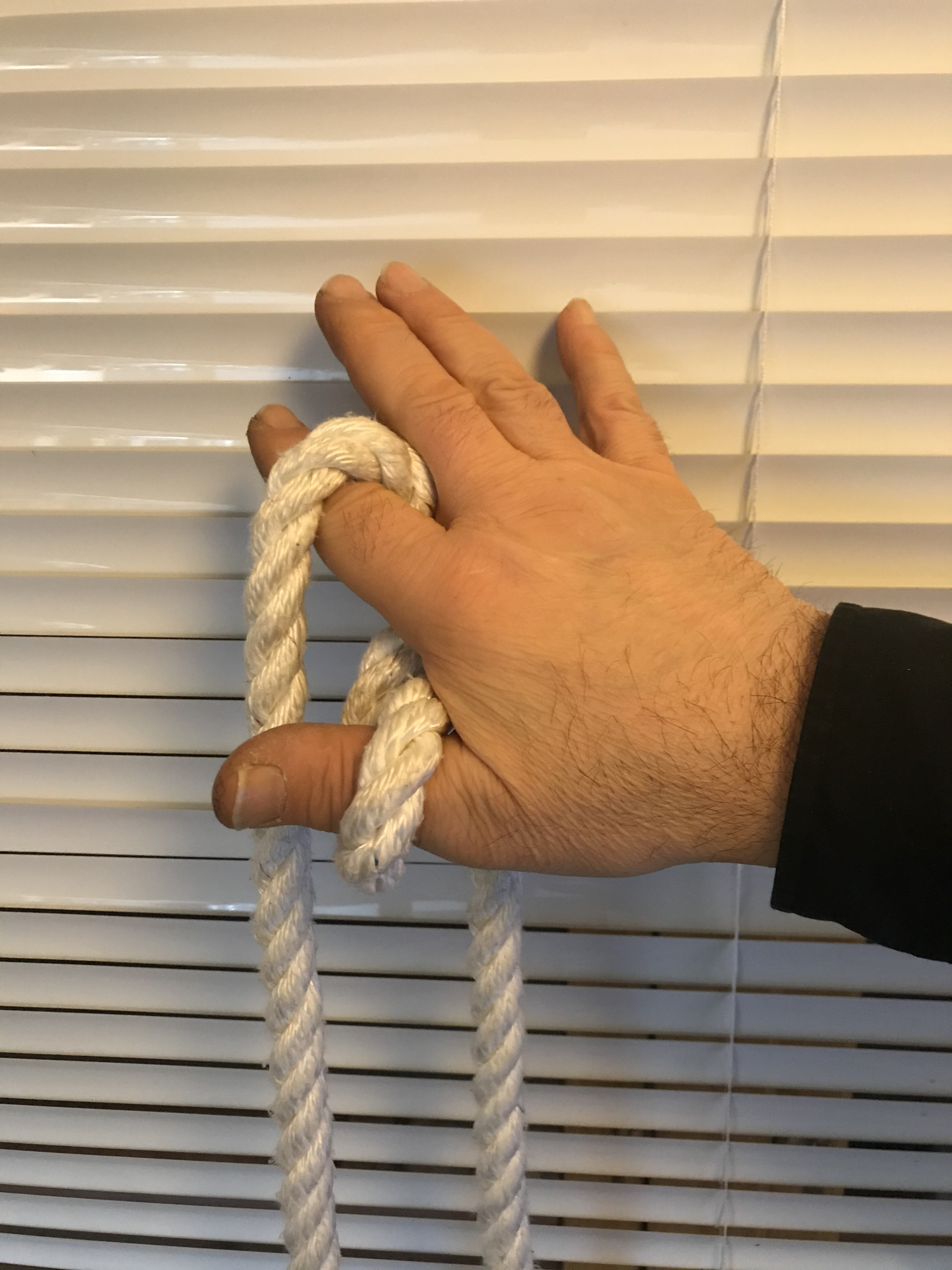
5. The hand is rotated around the front rope, the index finger gets under then points up.

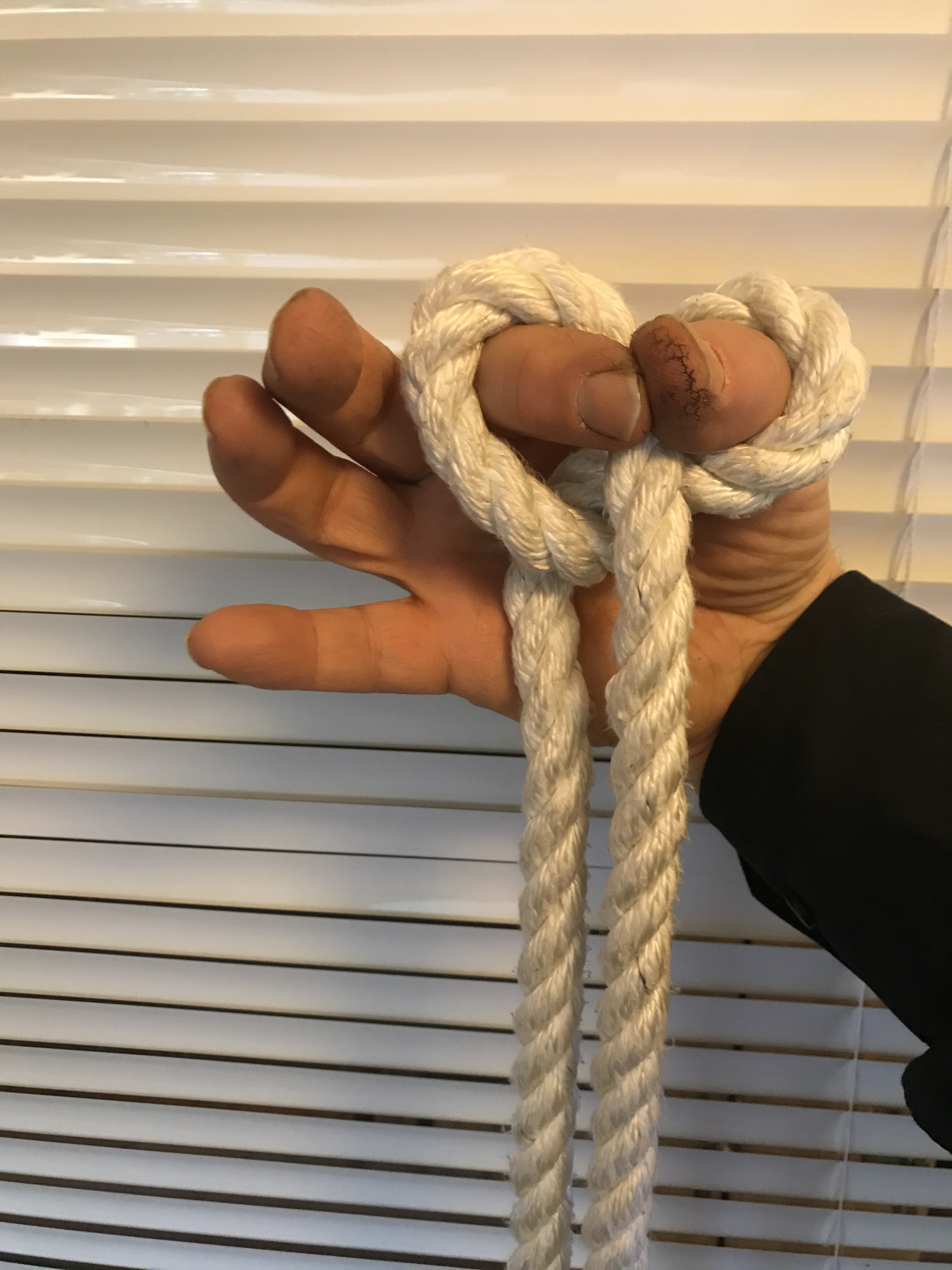
6. The index finger and the thumb are joined to gather the final knot.

== Related knots ==
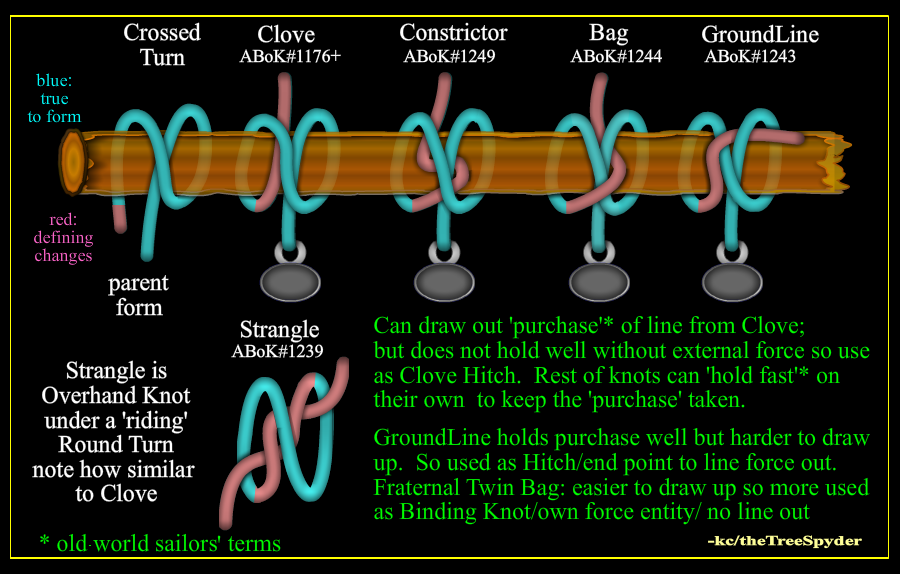
Clove Family of Constrictor – ABOK#1176, Miller's/Bag – ABOK#1242, Groundline – ABOK#1243, Strangle – ABOK#1239

When a turn around an object is made and a clove hitch is tied to the rope's own standing part, it produces either a buntline hitch or two half-hitches, depending on whether the turns of the clove hitch progress toward or away from the hitched object. Two-half hitches is also the capsized form of a granny knot. The buntline hitch itself is used as a necktie knot called the four-in-hand knot.

The clove hitch is also a part of a family of binding knots called millers' knots, which all start with a single hitch tied around an object.

== See also ==
- List of knots
