= Snuggle hitch =

Type of knot

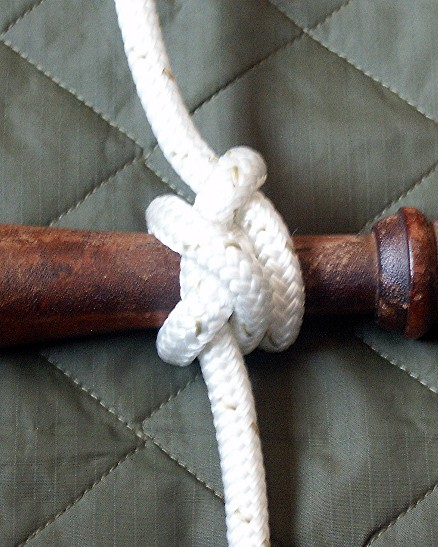
- Category: Hitch
- Origin: First publication 1987
- Related: Clove hitch, Ground-line hitch

The snuggle hitch is a modification of the clove hitch, and is stronger and more secure. Owen K. Nuttall of the International Guild of Knot Tyers came up with this unique hitch, and it was first documented in the Guild's Knotting Matters magazine issue of January, 1987. Generally, hitches are used to attach a line to another rope or spar, pole, etc., and are usually temporary. Thus, they should be relatively easy to untie.

== Tying ==
Start by tying a clove hitch around the spar or pole. Then make an additional turn around with the working end, in the same direction as the turns forming the clove hitch. Now, tuck the working end under the standing part of the original clove hitch. Pull up tight to complete the hitch.

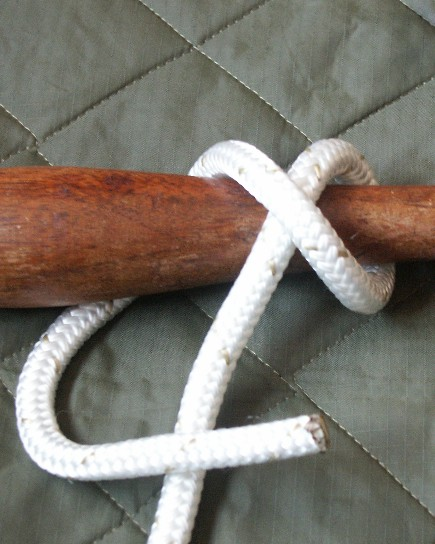
1. Almost a clove hitch...

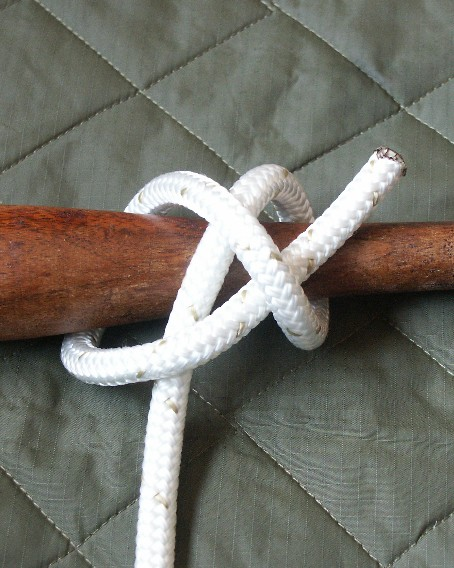
2. Clove hitch complete...

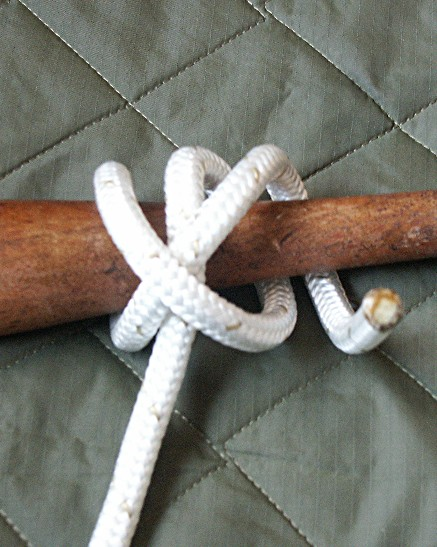
3. Make another turn around...

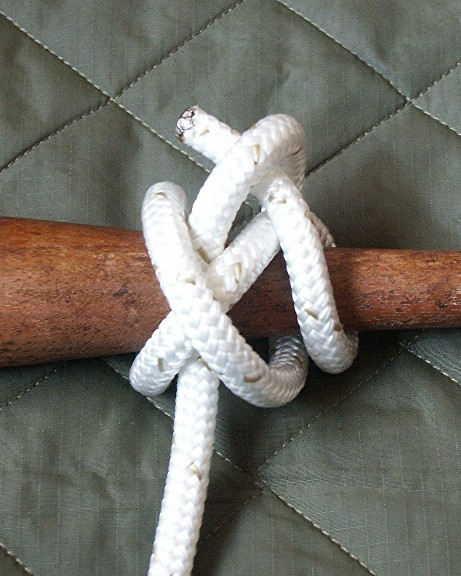
4. Tuck under standing part...

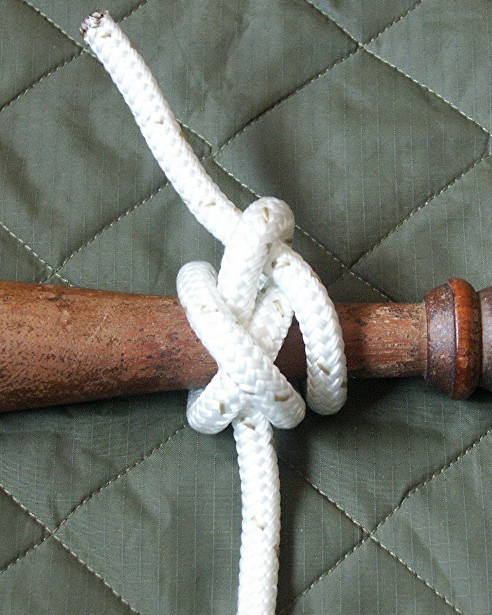
5. Pull up tight...

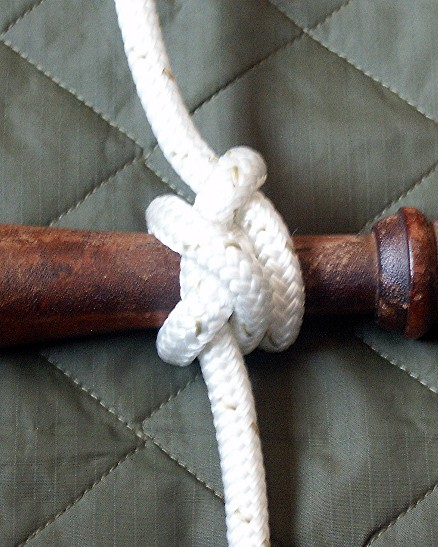
6. Finished snuggle hitch.

== See also ==
- List of knots
