= Halter hitch =

Type of knot

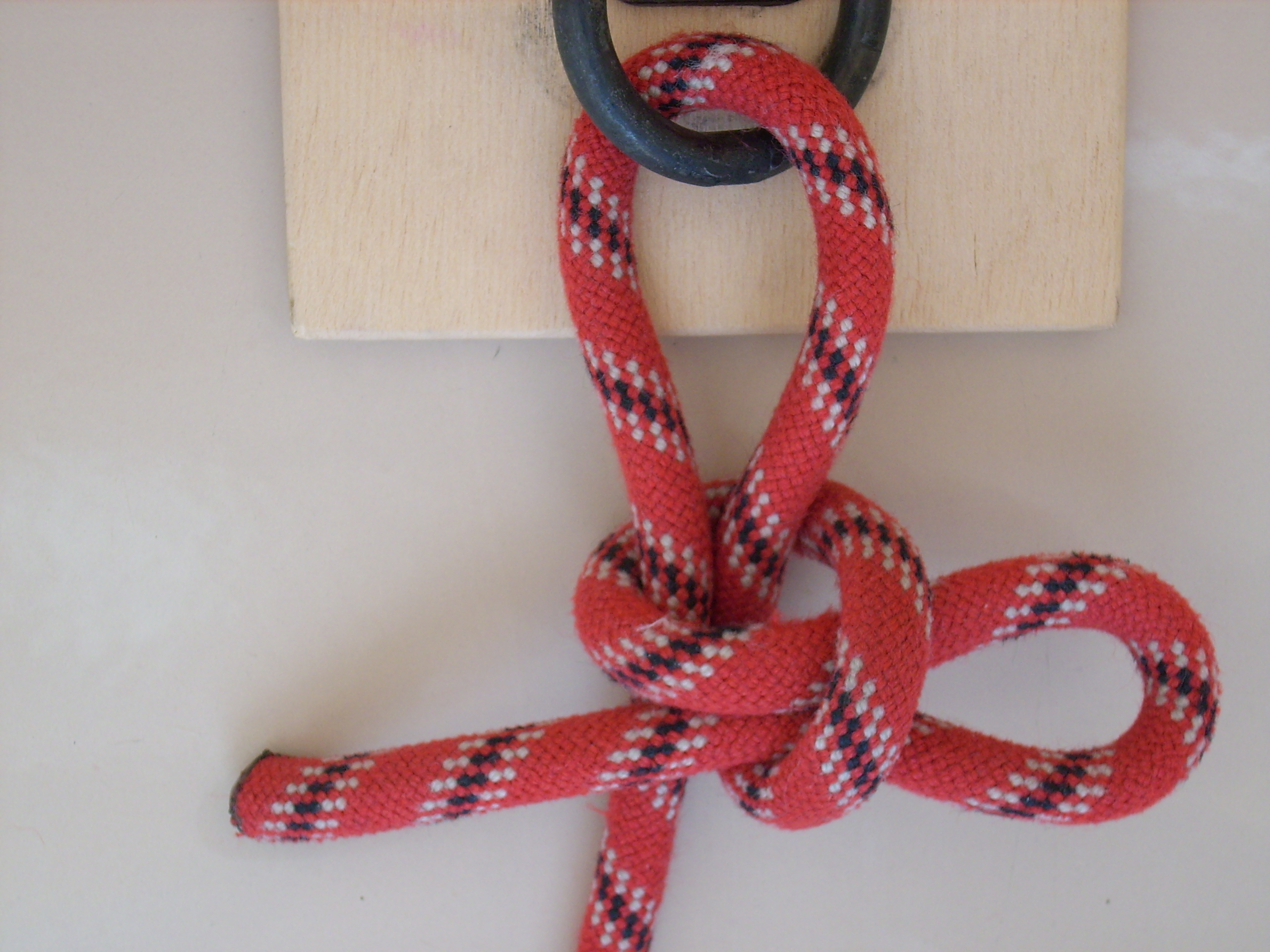
- Category: Hitch
- Related: Falconer's knot, Slippery hitch, Siberian hitch, Noose
- Releasing: Quick-release
- Typical use: tethering animals
- ABoK: #243, #1715, #1804, #1826

The halter hitch is a type of knot used to connect a rope to an object. As the name implies, an animal's lead rope, attached to its halter, may be tied to a post or hitching rail with this knot. The benefit of the halter hitch is that it can be easily released by pulling on one end of the rope, even if it is under tension. Some sources show the knot being finished with the free end running through the slipped loop to prevent it from working loose or being untied by a clever animal, still allowing easy but not instant untying.

== Tying ==
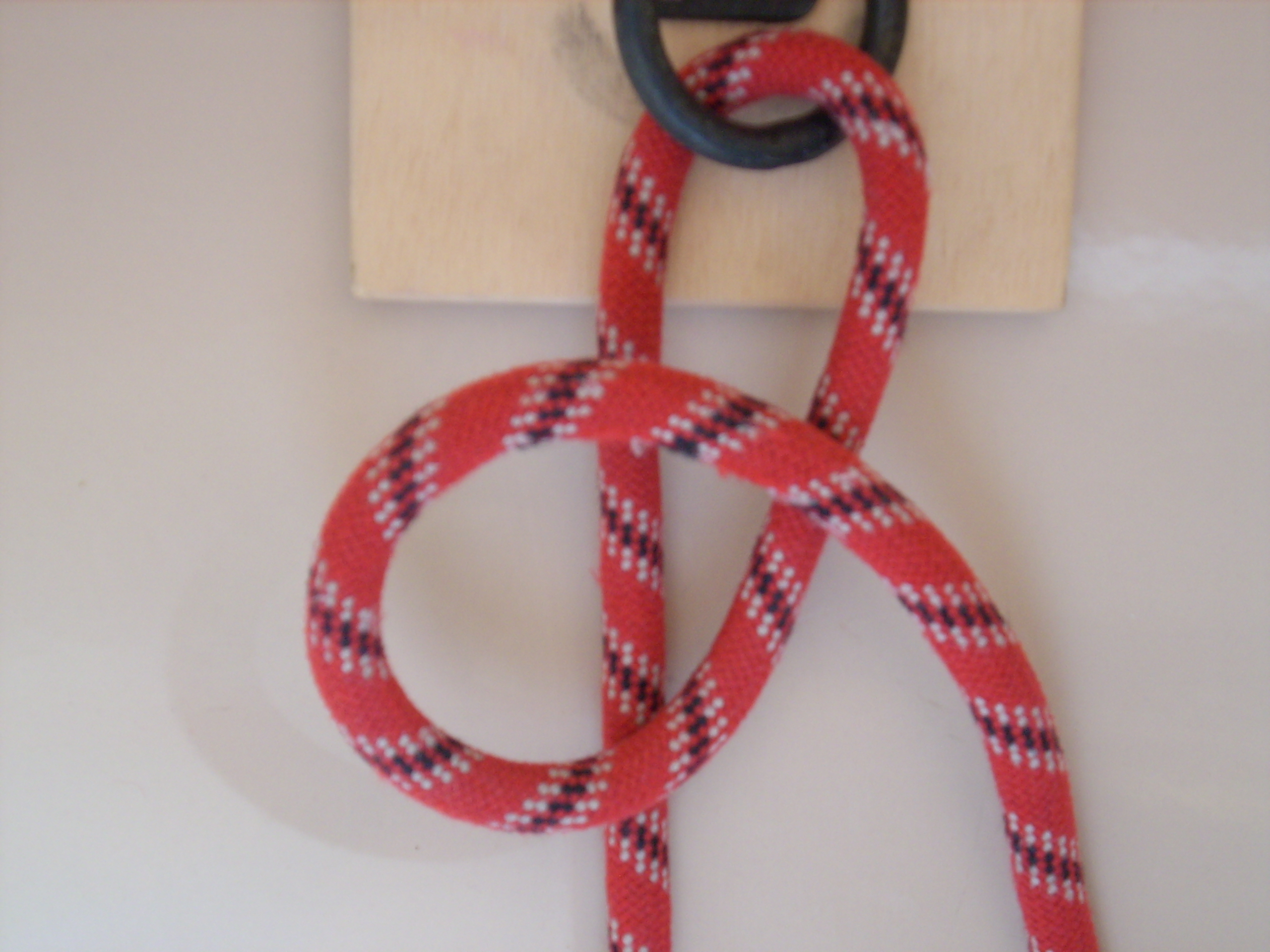
Halter hitch 1 : Place rope behind, through or around anchor object. Form a loop in the working part of the rope.

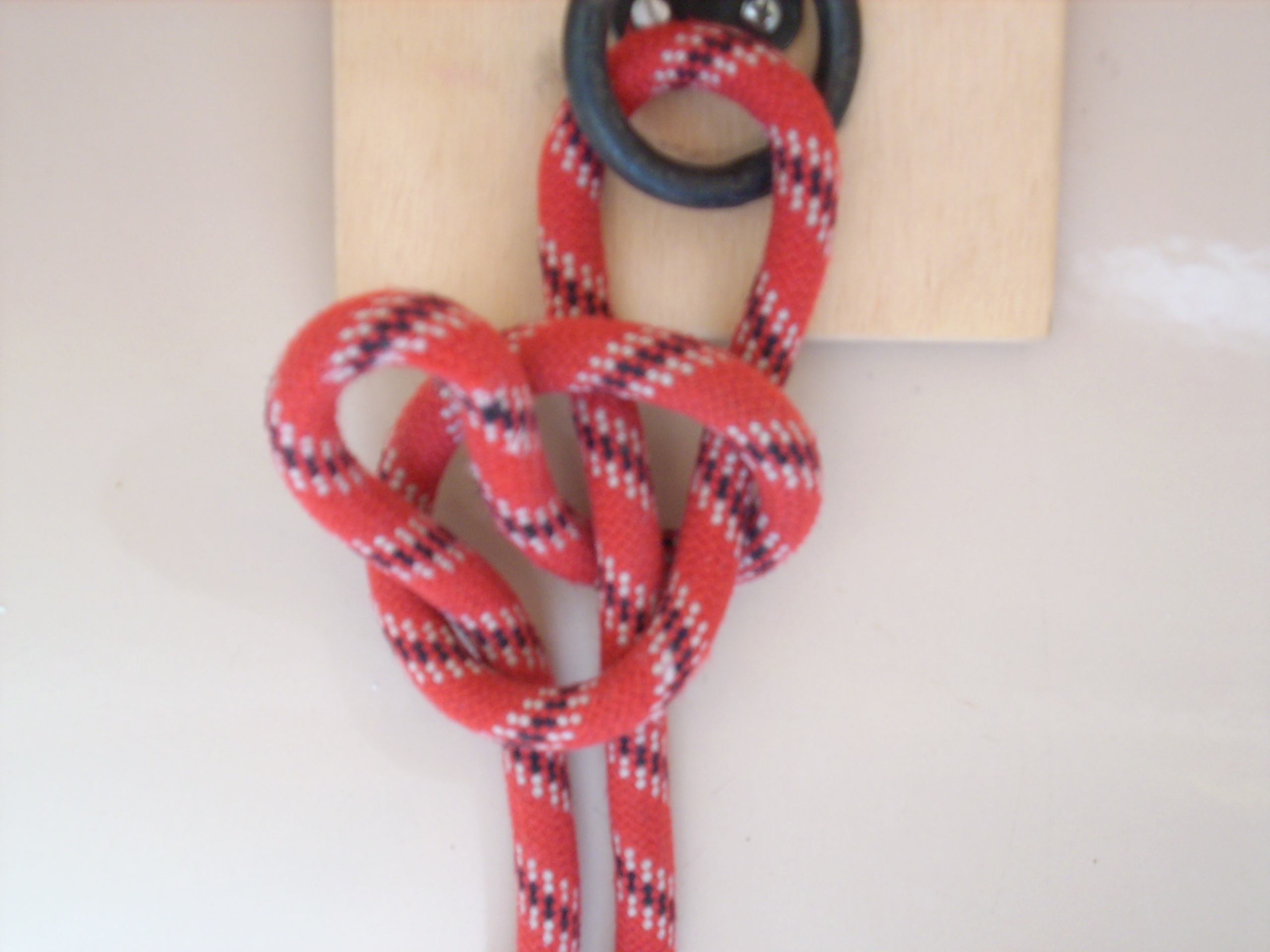
Halter hitch 2 : Pull a bight of the working part behind the standing part and then through the loop formed in first step.

The halter hitch can be derived from the Noose knot by turning the working end into a bight.

== Difference from similar hitches with the same purpose ==
The halter hitch is topologically the same knot as the Falconer's knot, i. e. a slipped overhand knot around the main part. The falconer has to tie the same knot one handed, throwing the end around the anchor object (the perch), gripping it with a scissoring fingers act, pulling the bight from opposite side of the main part using the back of the thumb.

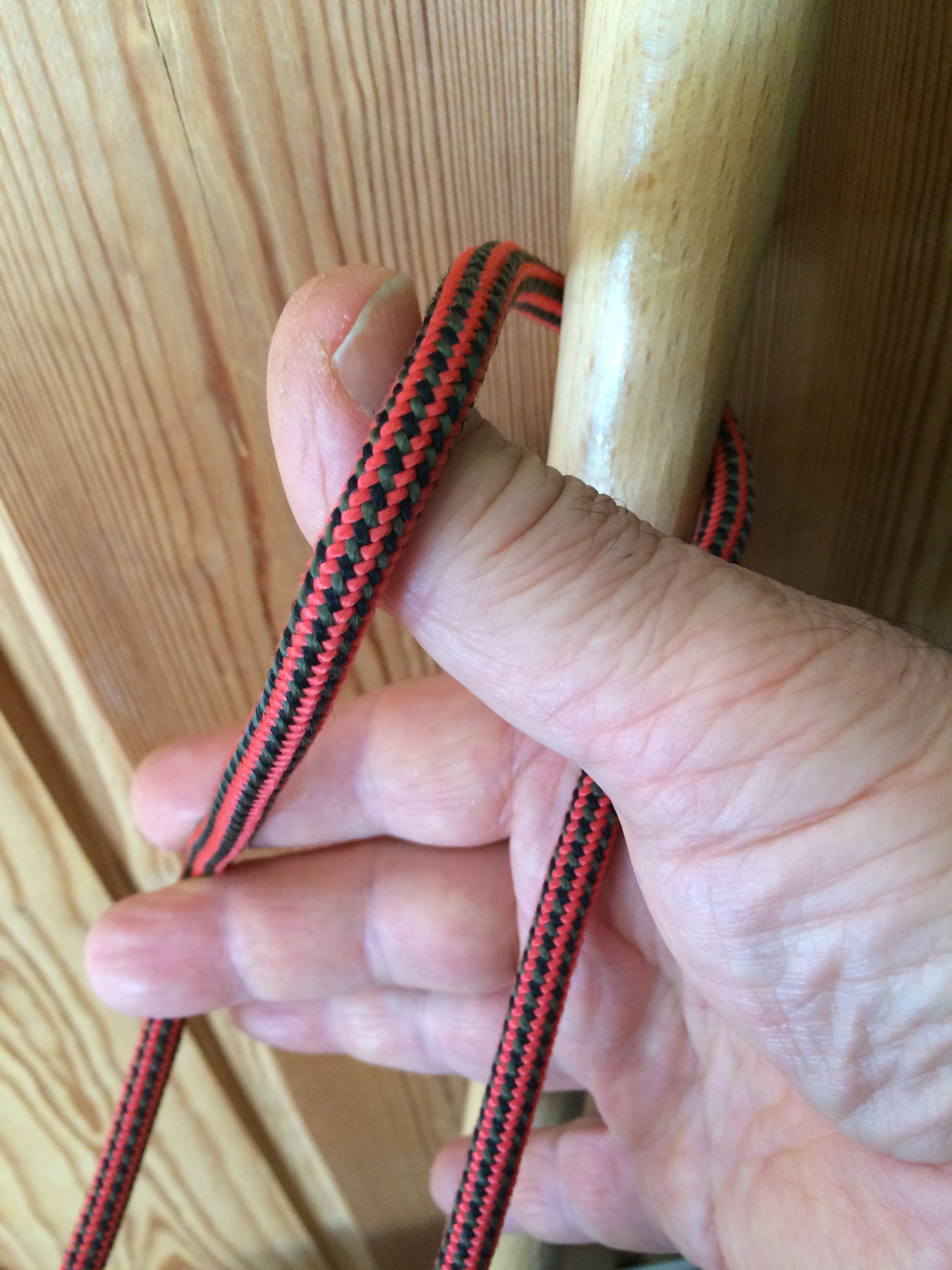
Falconer's knot 1 : Pinching fingers from below, hooking thumb from above

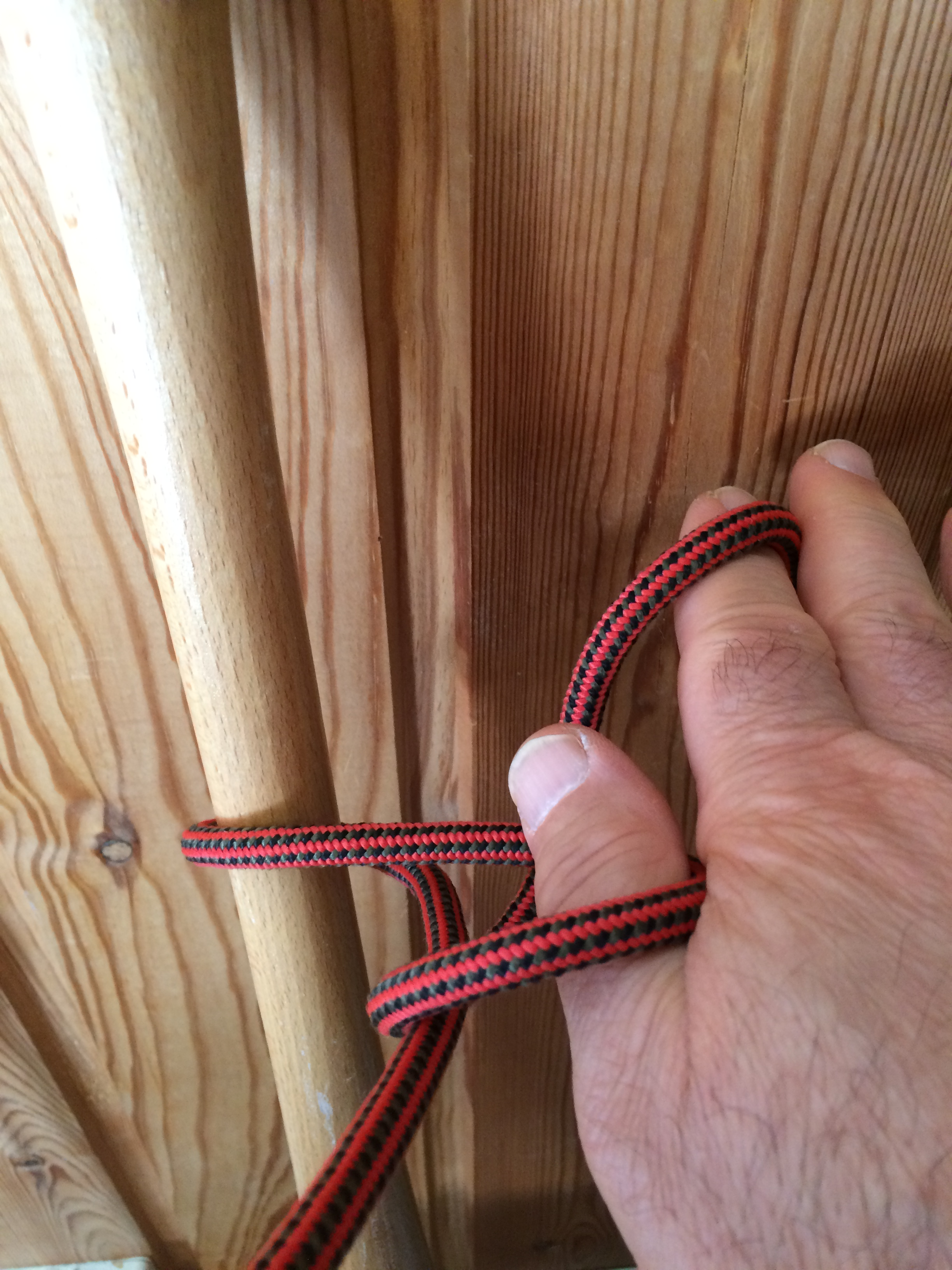
Falconer's knot 2 : Hand rotated counterclockwise in a "GO AWAY" sign from below

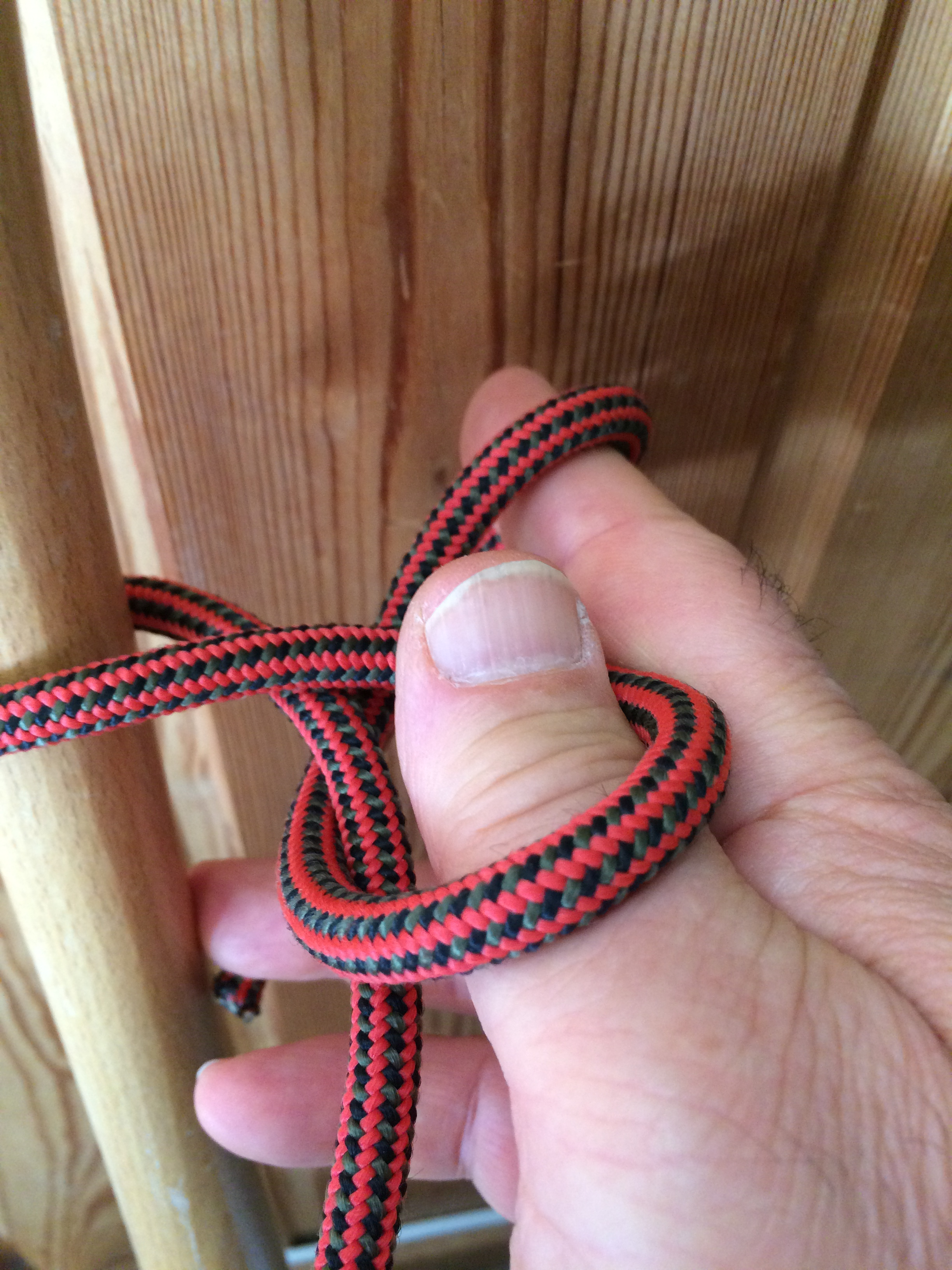
Falconer's knot 3 : End bight scissored between fingers to thumb loop

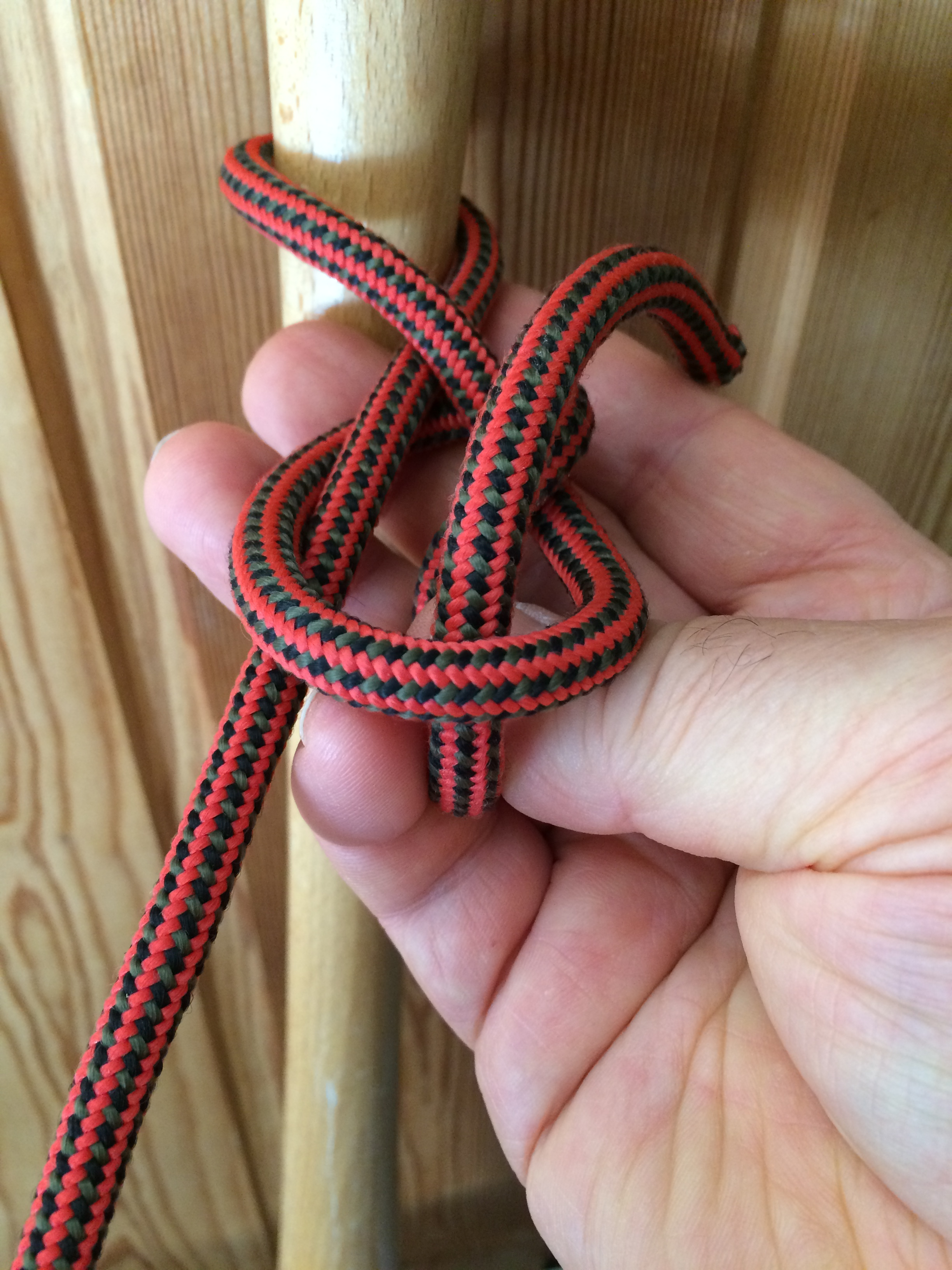
Falconer's knot 4 : End bight slipped through loop around thumb

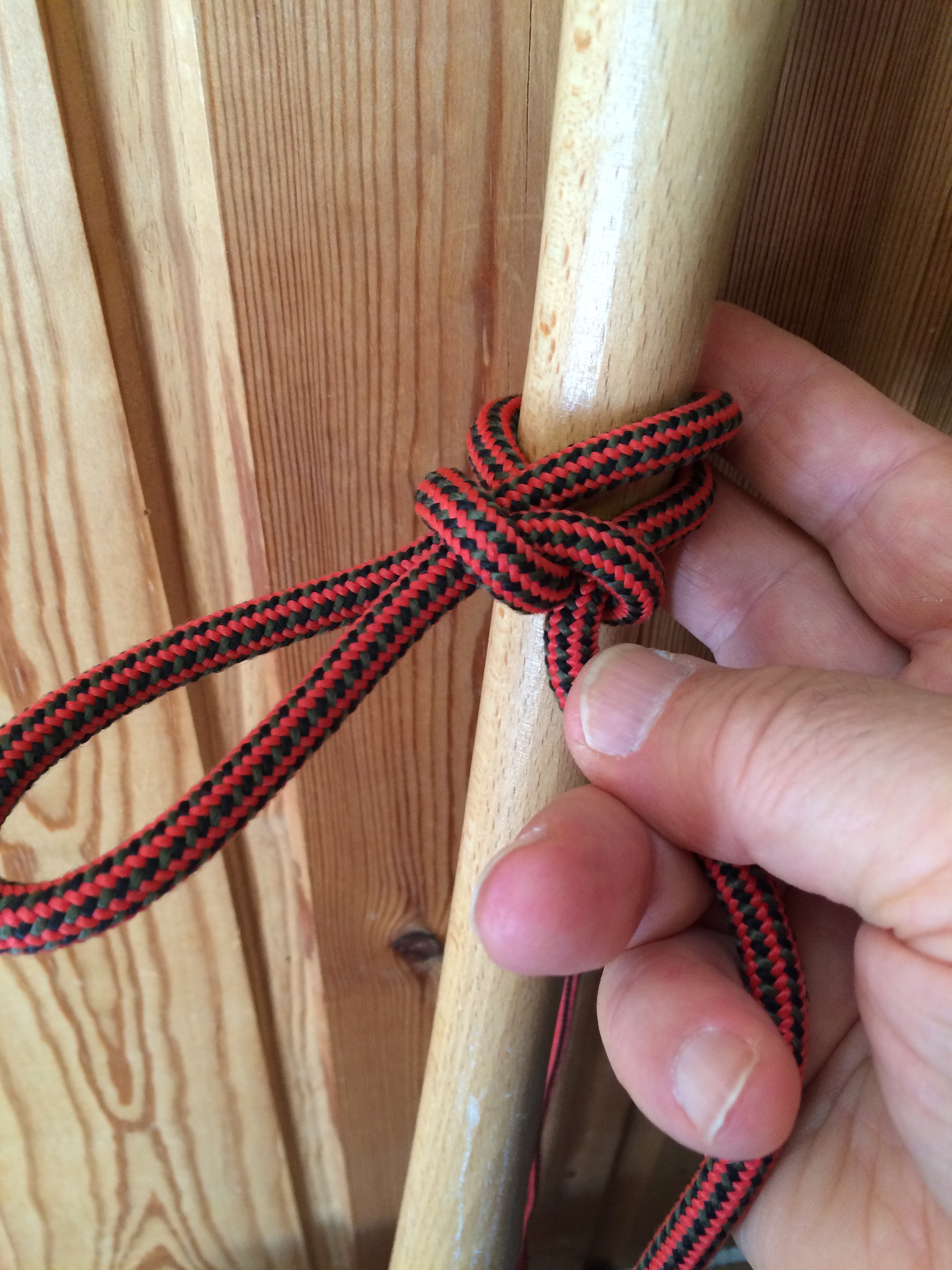
Falconer's knot 5 : Tightened by pulling main part, pushing the knot

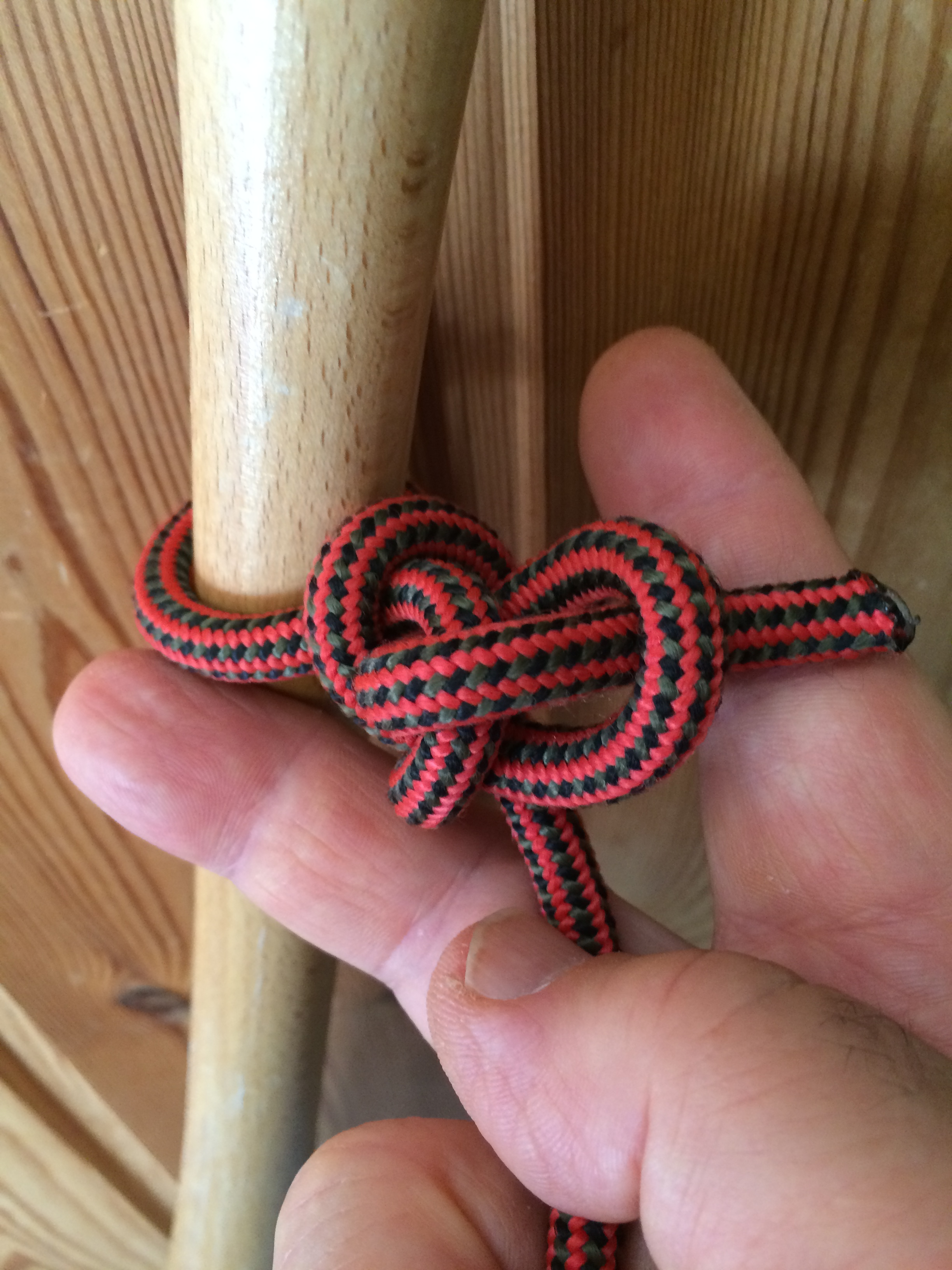
Falconer's knot 6 : Locked with free end through slip

The halter hitch is similar to other slipped hitches that wrap the main part with small differences:

- The Siberian hitch is one where the bight for the slip is twisted one more time i.e. a slipped Figure-eight knot around the main part. Stronger, traditionally used to tie a horse or reindeer by evenks in Siberia, tied with a method suitable for tying while wearing a glove.
- The Slippery hitch and Buntline hitch are essentially a slipped Clove hitch around the main part. Slippery hitch has the slip placed under the last turn away from the main part, while Buntline hitch has the slip placed under the last turn towards the main part. Easy to tie, secure, easy to untie, Slippery hitch is used several in a row on square-rigged ships for securing the gaskets that bind stowed sails to the yards on top, while Buntline hitch, stronger but more difficult to untie, is used slipped to secure the bottom of open sail.
- The half hitch with slip is one with no extra bight, no extra turn, just a slip inside the half hitch, much weaker than all of the above hitches.
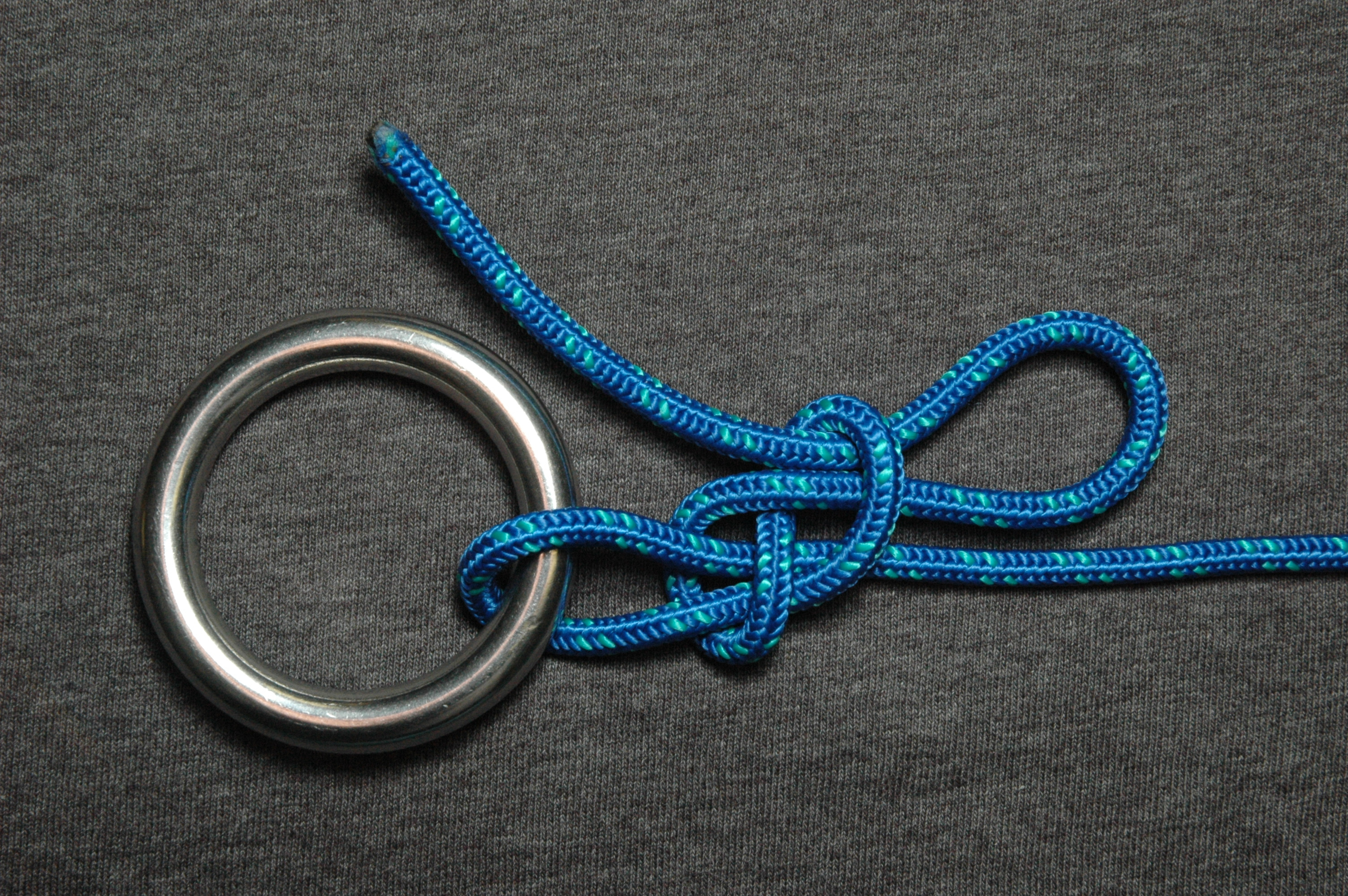
Siberian hitch

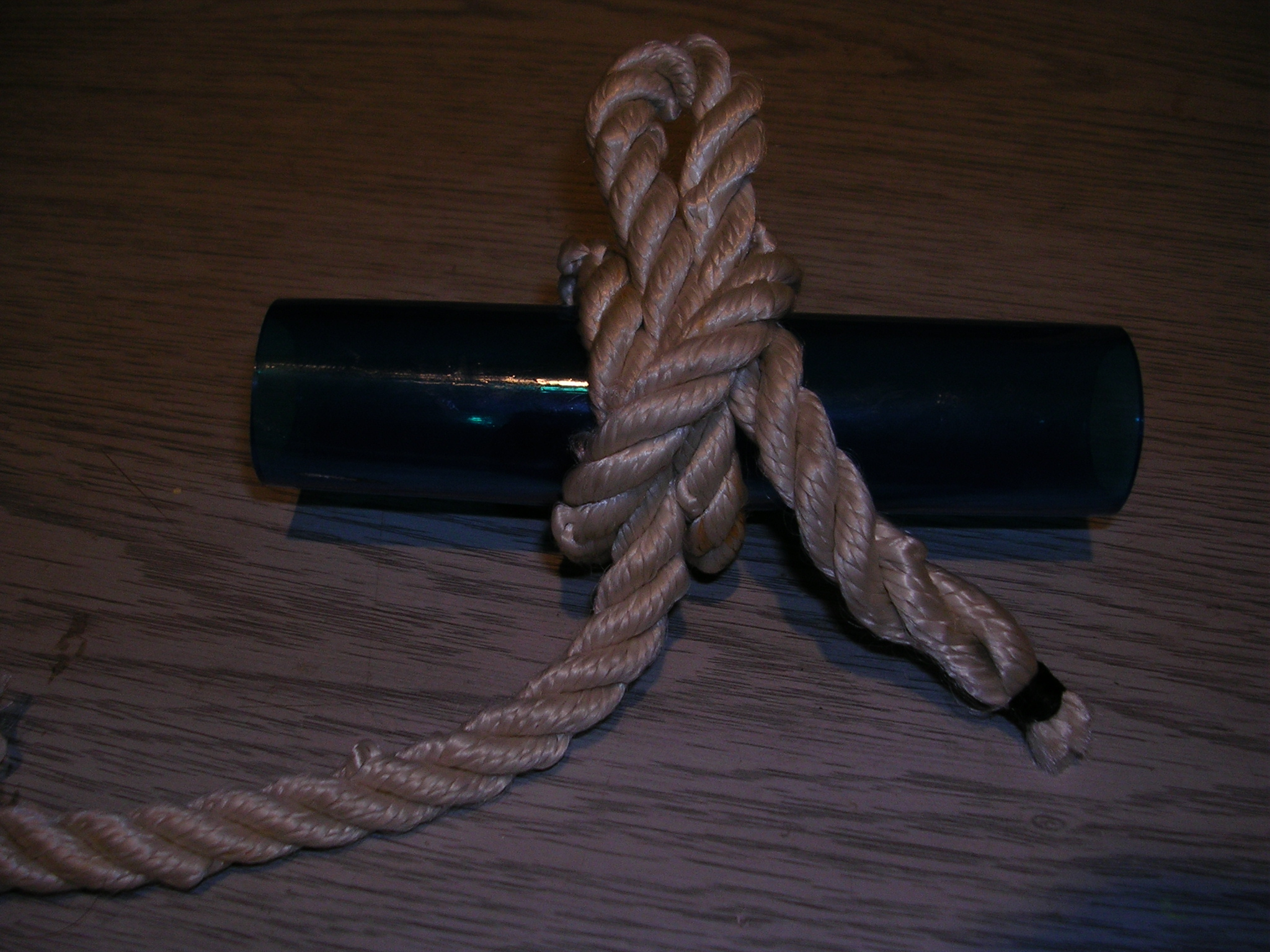
Slippery hitch

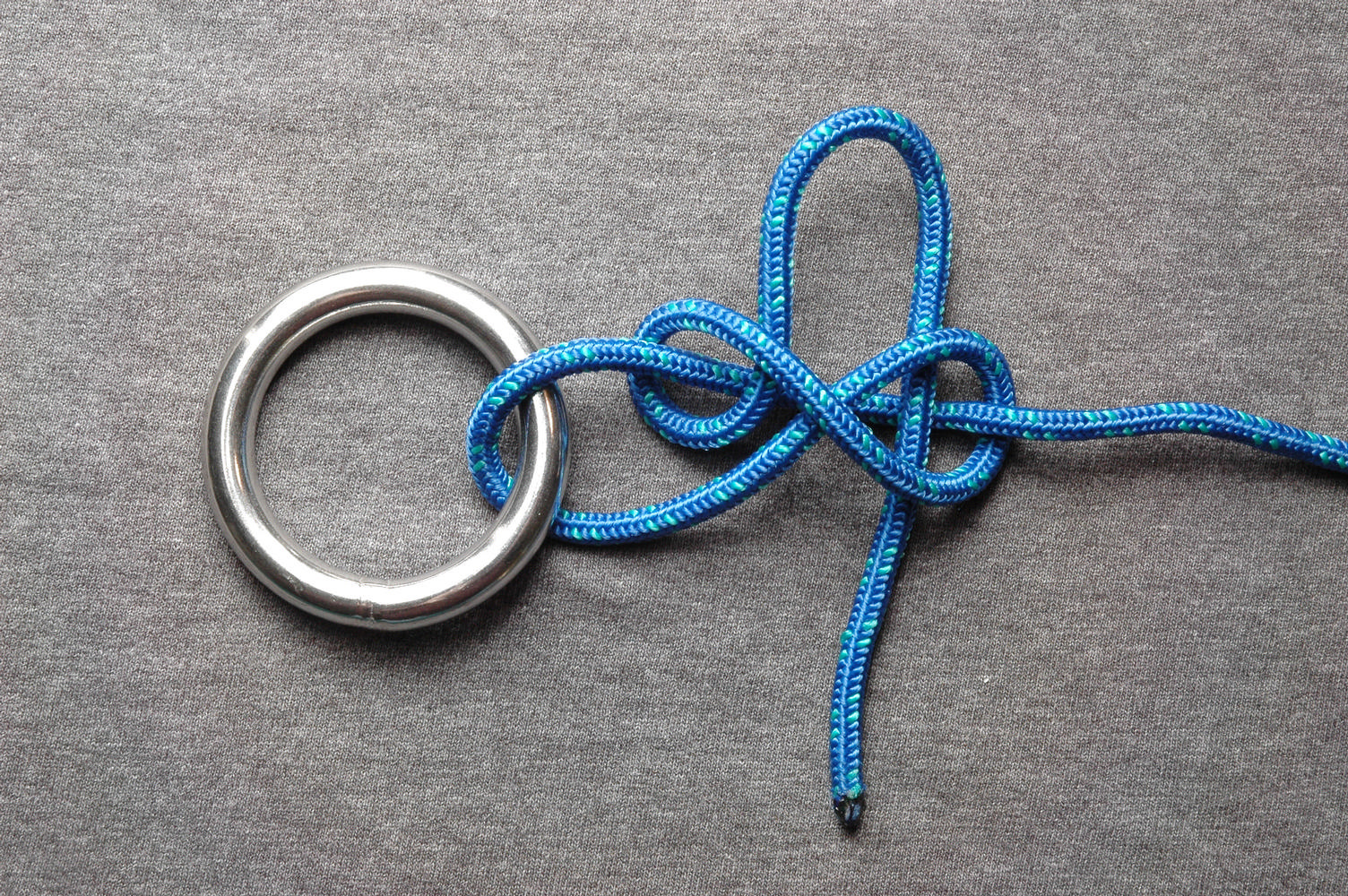
Untightened slipped buntline hitch

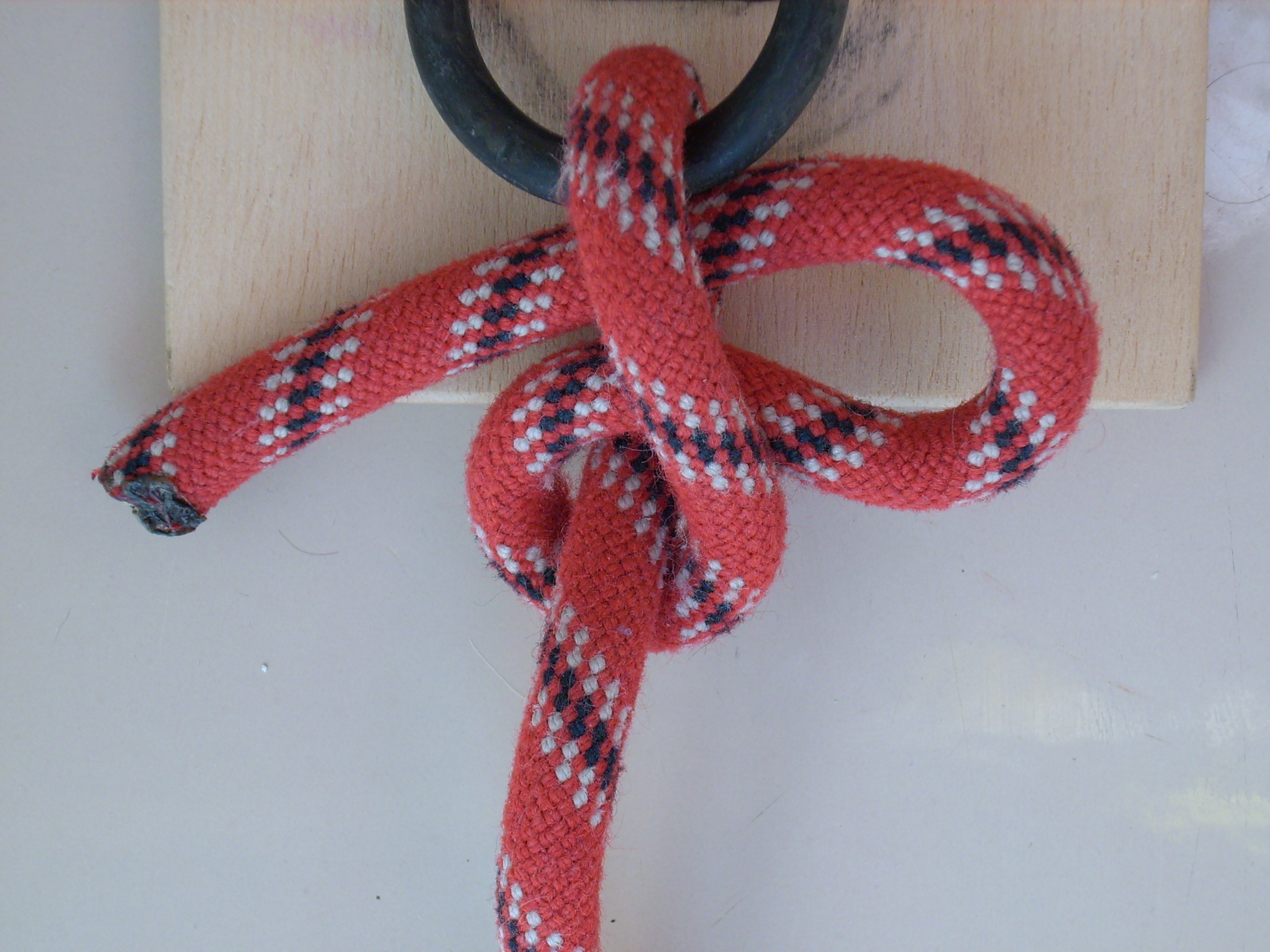
Half hitch with slip

== See also ==
- List of knots
