= Siberian hitch =

Type of knot

Siberian Hitch
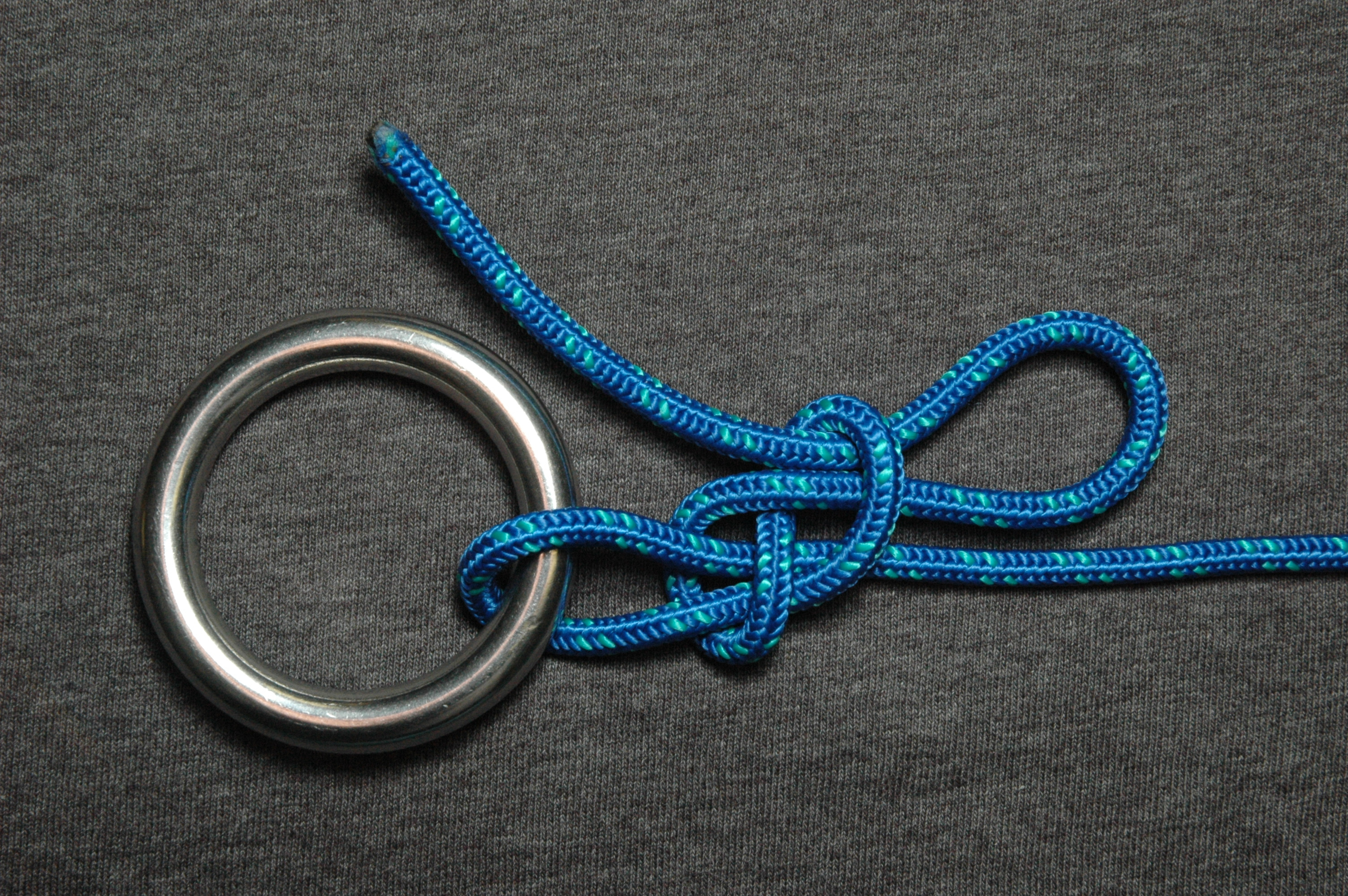
- Names: Siberian Hitch, Evenk knot, Evenk Slippery Figure of Eight Hitch
- Category: Hitch
- Related: Halter hitch, Slipped buntline hitch, Highwayman's hitch, Packer's knot, Figure-eight knot, Farrimond friction hitch
- Releasing: Quick release
- Typical use: Bushcraft

The Siberian hitch (or Evenk knot) is a hitch knot used to attach a rope to an object. It is a type of slipped figure-eight noose. The hitch is known for having a tying method suitable even while wearing heavy gloves or mittens in cold climates. As a slipped knot it can be released simply by pulling the working end of the rope.

== History ==
The hitch and its associated tying method were recorded in use among the Nenets people of northern Russia in the early 1990s. The knot's ease of tying and releasing while wearing cold weather gear was cited as a primary advantage.

It was also used by Ray Mears during his bushcraft television series.

== Tying ==
While it can be tied by other methods, it is associated with the one demonstrated in the following video.
