= Falconer's knot =

Type of knot

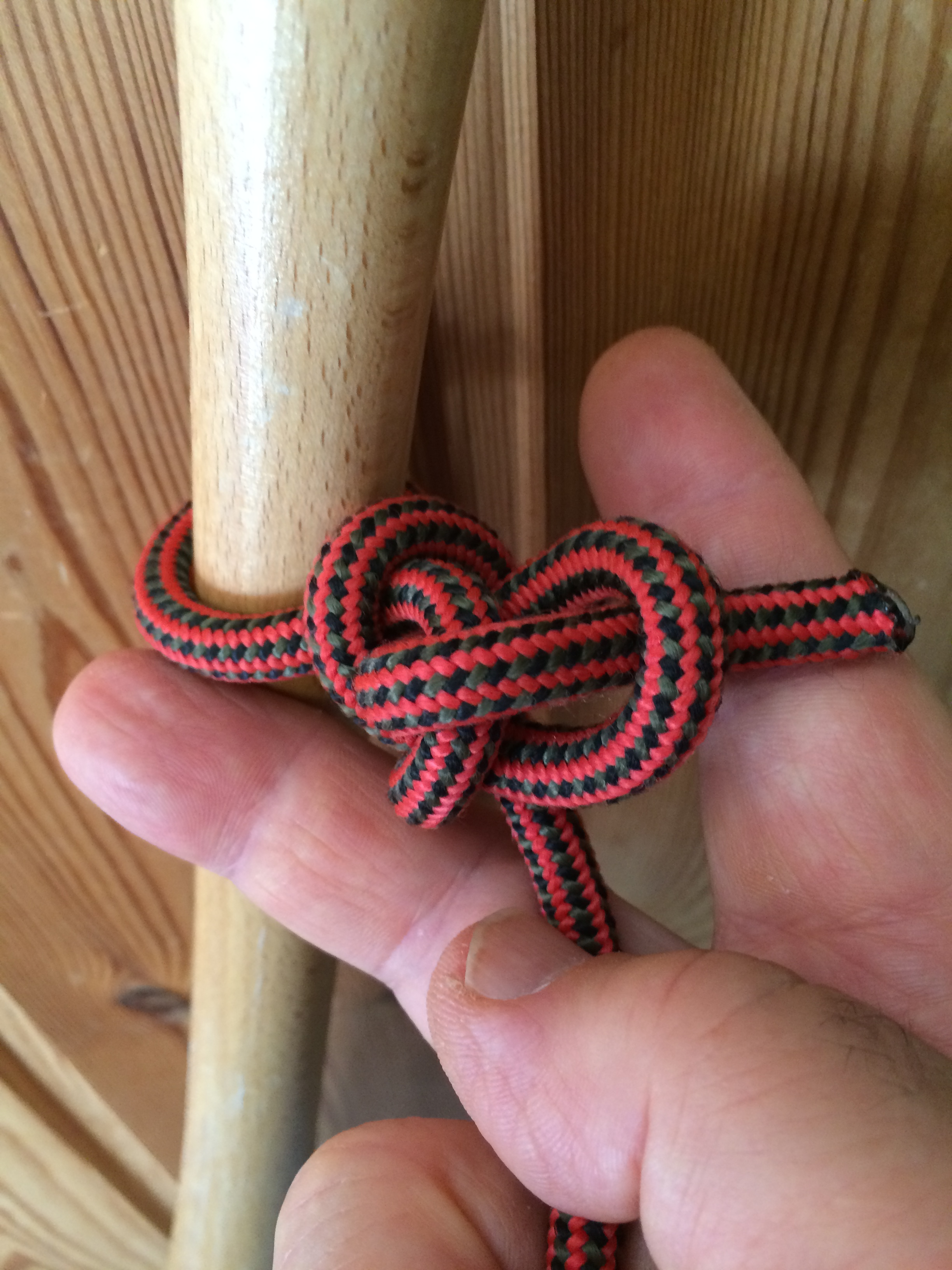
- Category: Hitch
- Related: Halter hitch
- Releasing: Non-jamming
- Typical use: Falconry

The falconer's knot is a knot used in falconry to tether a bird of prey to a perch. Some sources show this knot to be identical to the halter hitch, but with a specific method of single-handed tying needed when the other hand is occupied holding the bird, which makes this knot very useful.

== Tying ==
The falconer's knot is usually tied one handed with the right hand (using two fingers to hold the end, and the thumb to hook behind the end) as follows:

1. The rope is passed around the perch, with the tail end to the further side extending to the left.
2. The right hand, is placed palm up, underneath both pieces of rope and a middle point of the tail piece is pinch/gripped between the index and middle fingers, as if one were cutting the rope with scissors.
3. The thumb reaches over the main part, and over the "scissoring fingers", points first down to the right under the tail side, then upwards to hook the tail side rope with the back of the thumbnail,
4. Keeping the thumb in the same position hooking the tail side, the wrist with the pinched tail is then rotated to the right as if signalising "GO AWAY!" so that the back of the hand ends up facing up at the near side of both ropes while the scissoring fingers still hold the tail, and pulled now under the main part to the right.
5. Due to the rotation, the thumb (still over the main part) will have a loop of the tail side wrapped around. The "scissored" rope (still under the main part) is then to be put through the loop around the thumb, pushing with the fingers. The thumb may also help it through the loop.
6. The result is an Overhand knot of the tail, where the knot is around the main part, with a slip i.e. a Halter hitch. This is achieved without involving the left hand which usually is busy holding the animal attached to the main part. The knot is then tightened towards the perch, then the free tail end passed through the new slip loop, to secure (just in case the animal has learned to untie the slip knot by pulling the end).

To untie, one simply pulls out the free end, tugs hard, and it should untie. When securing birds of prey, two knots will often be used as birds can learn to untie them.

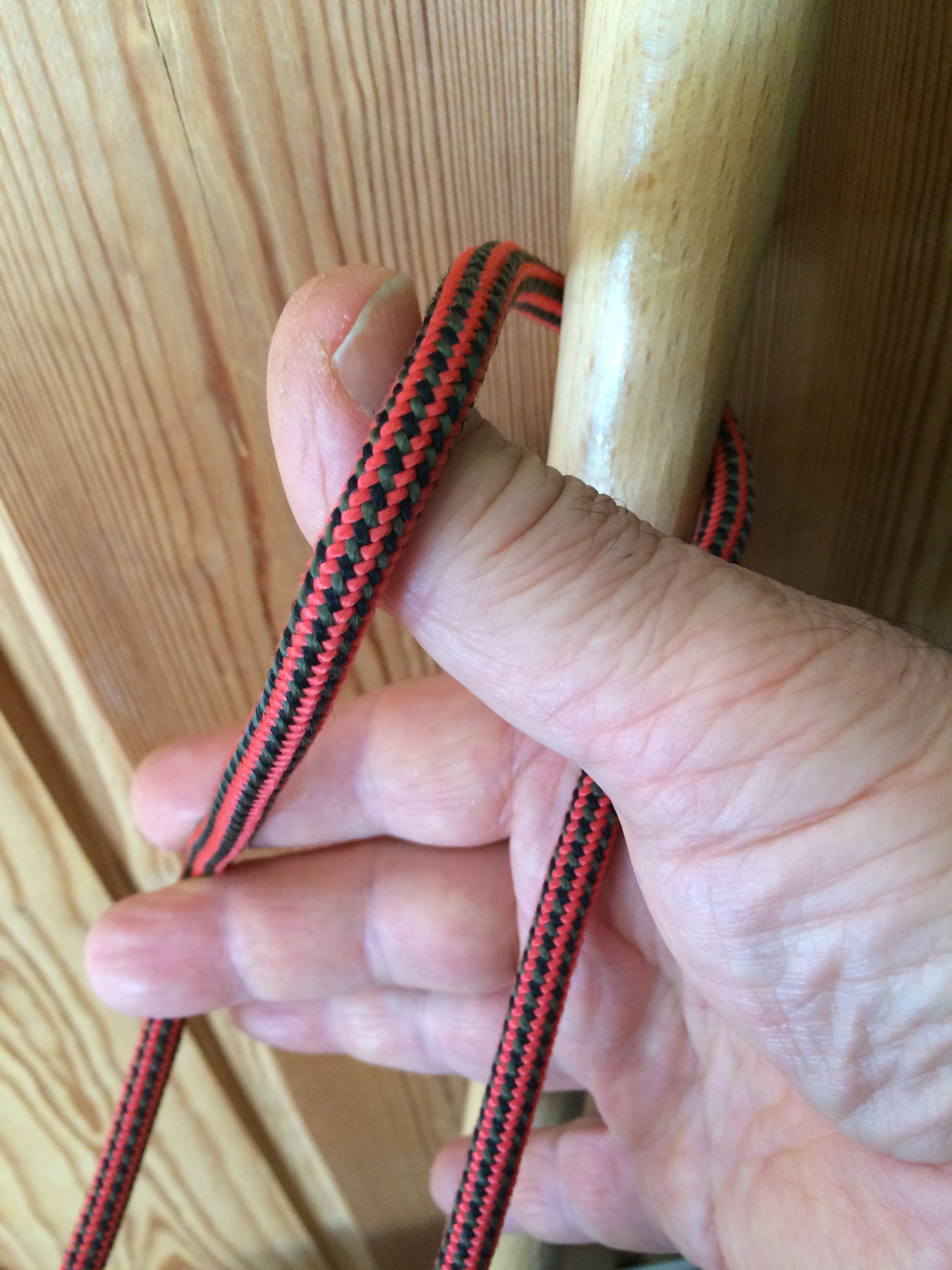
Falconer's knot 1 : pinching fingers from below, hooking thumb from above

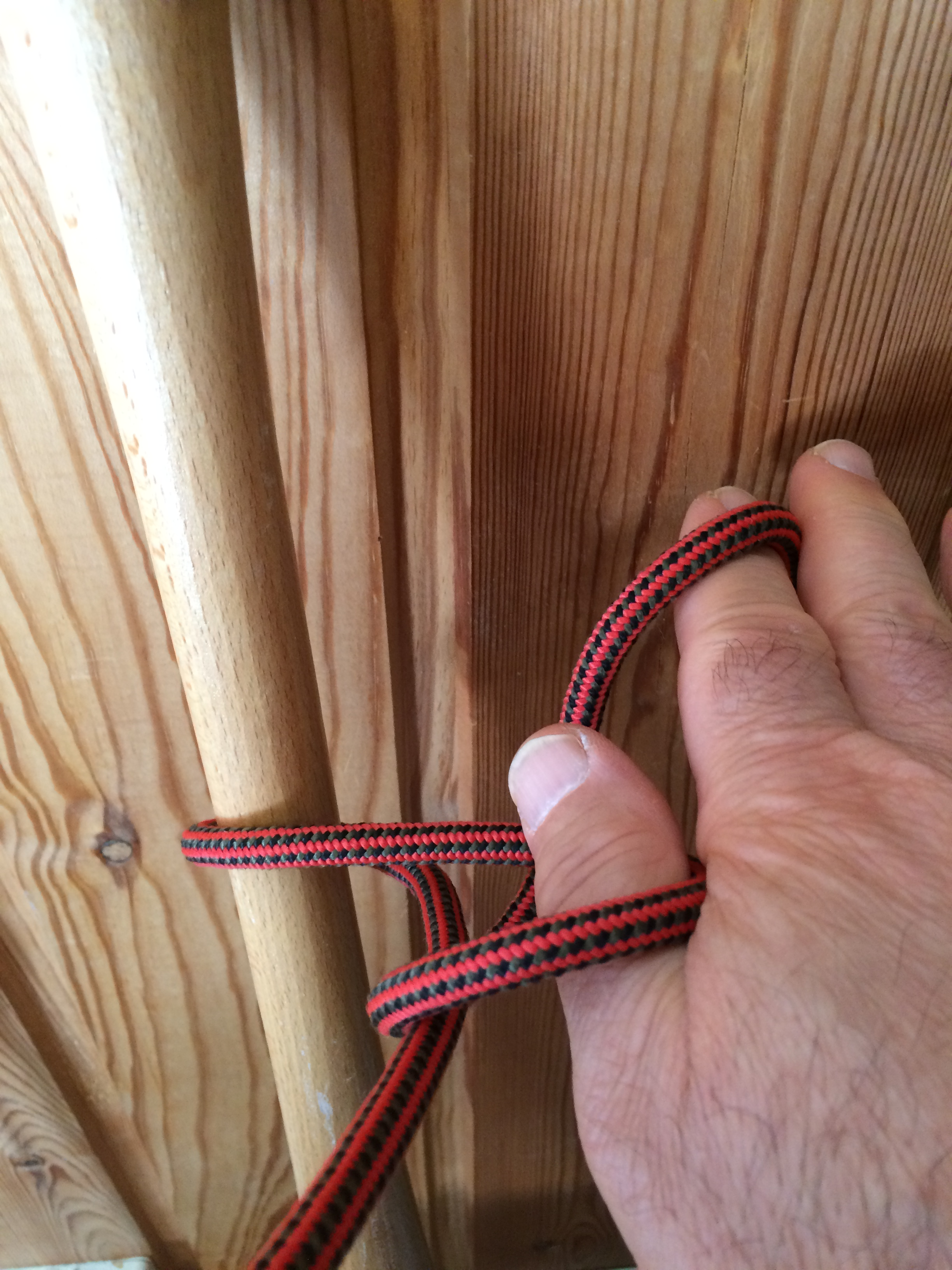
Falconer's knot 2 : hand rotated counterclockwise

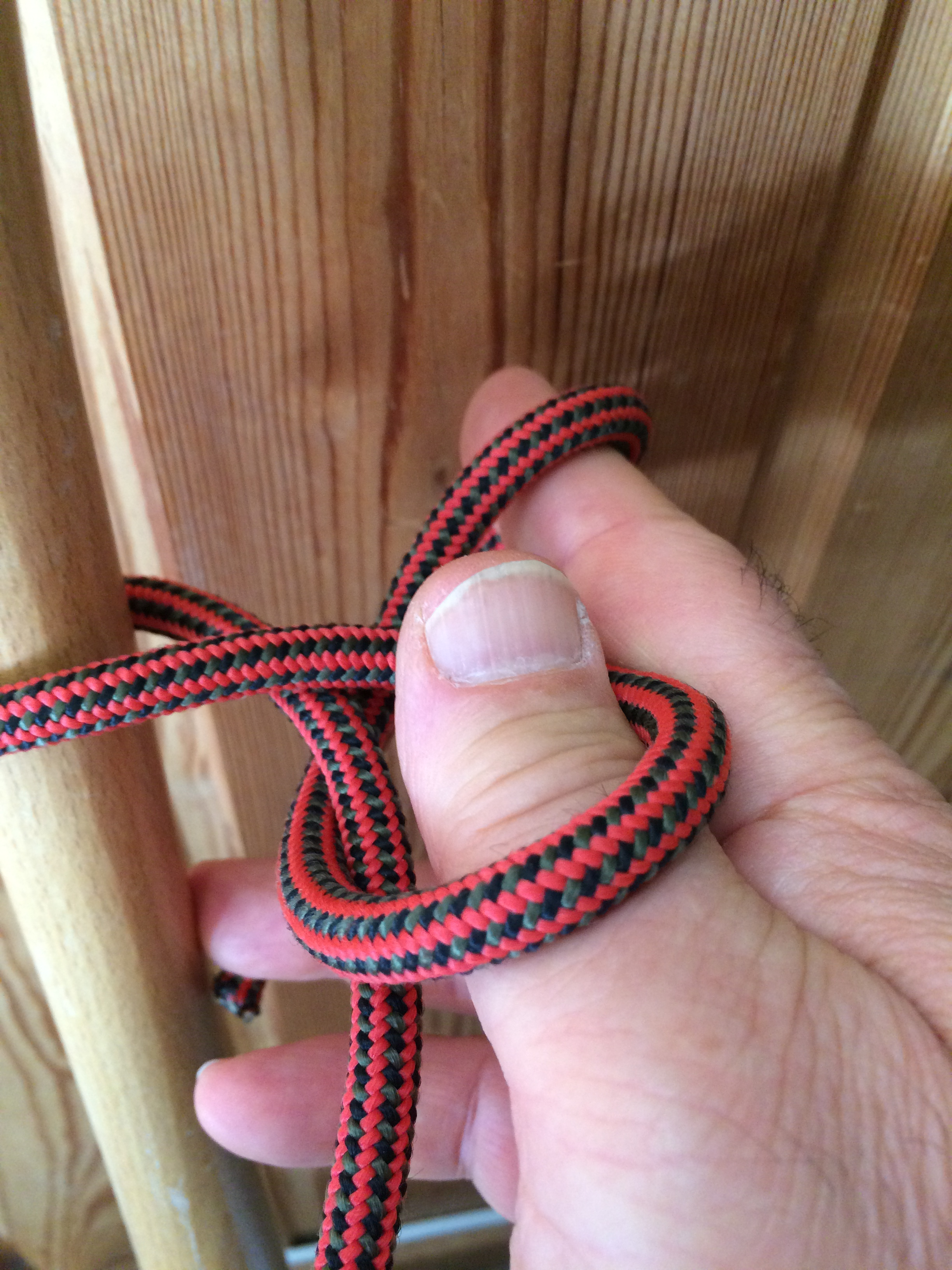
Falconer's knot 3 : Loop around the thumb, end between fingers

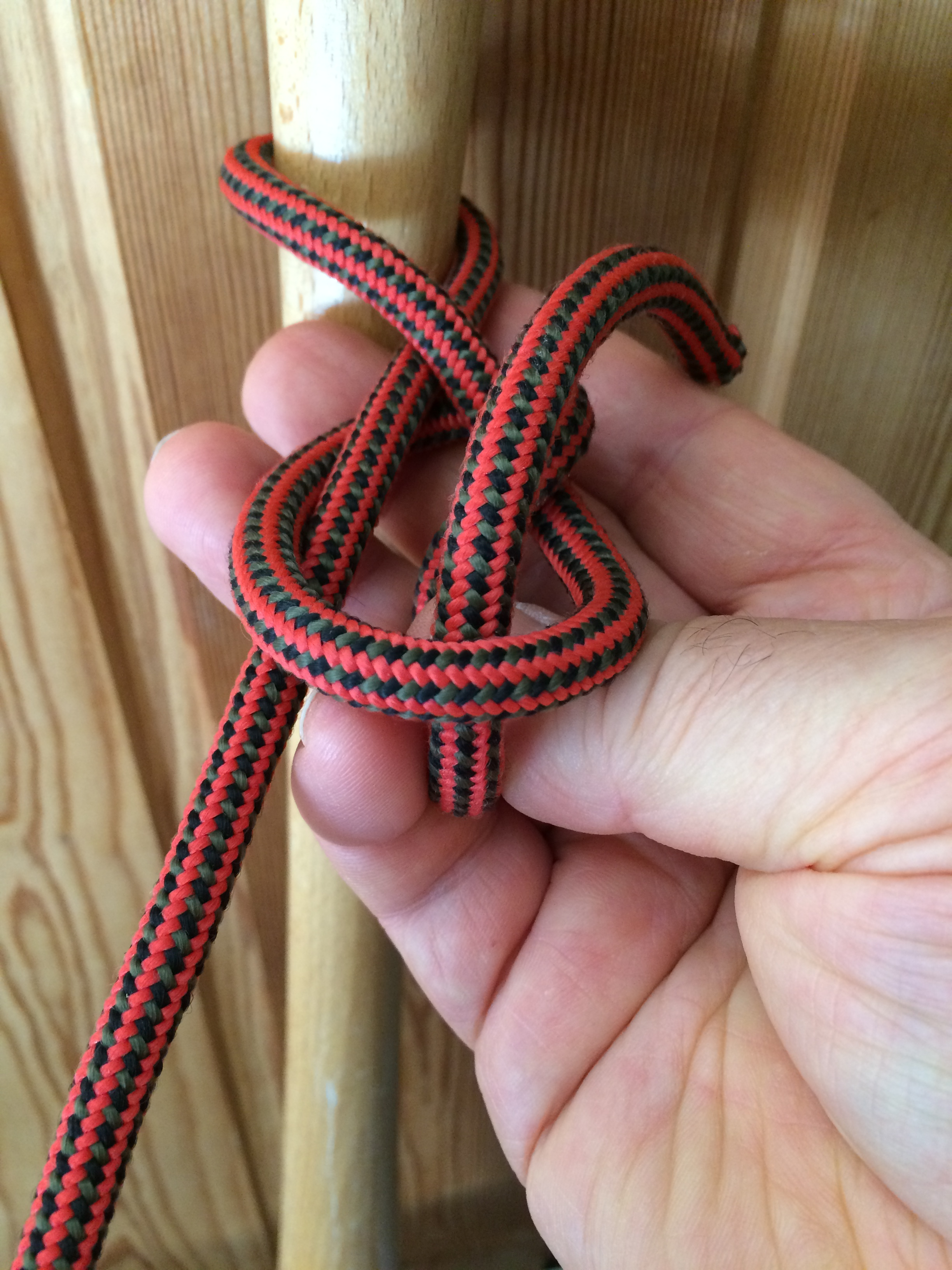
Falconer's knot 4 : End bight slipped through loop around thumb

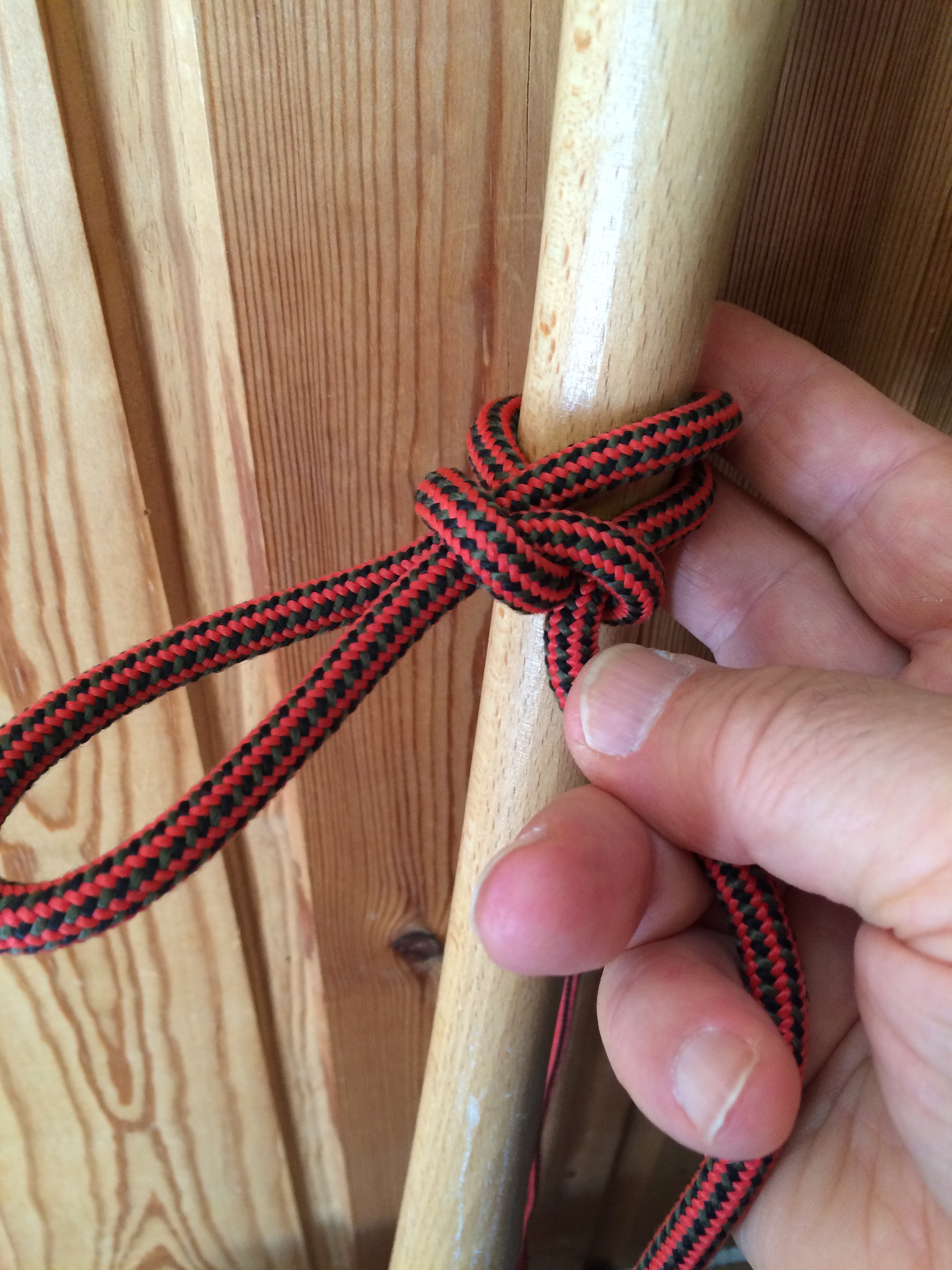
Falconer's knot 5 : Tightened

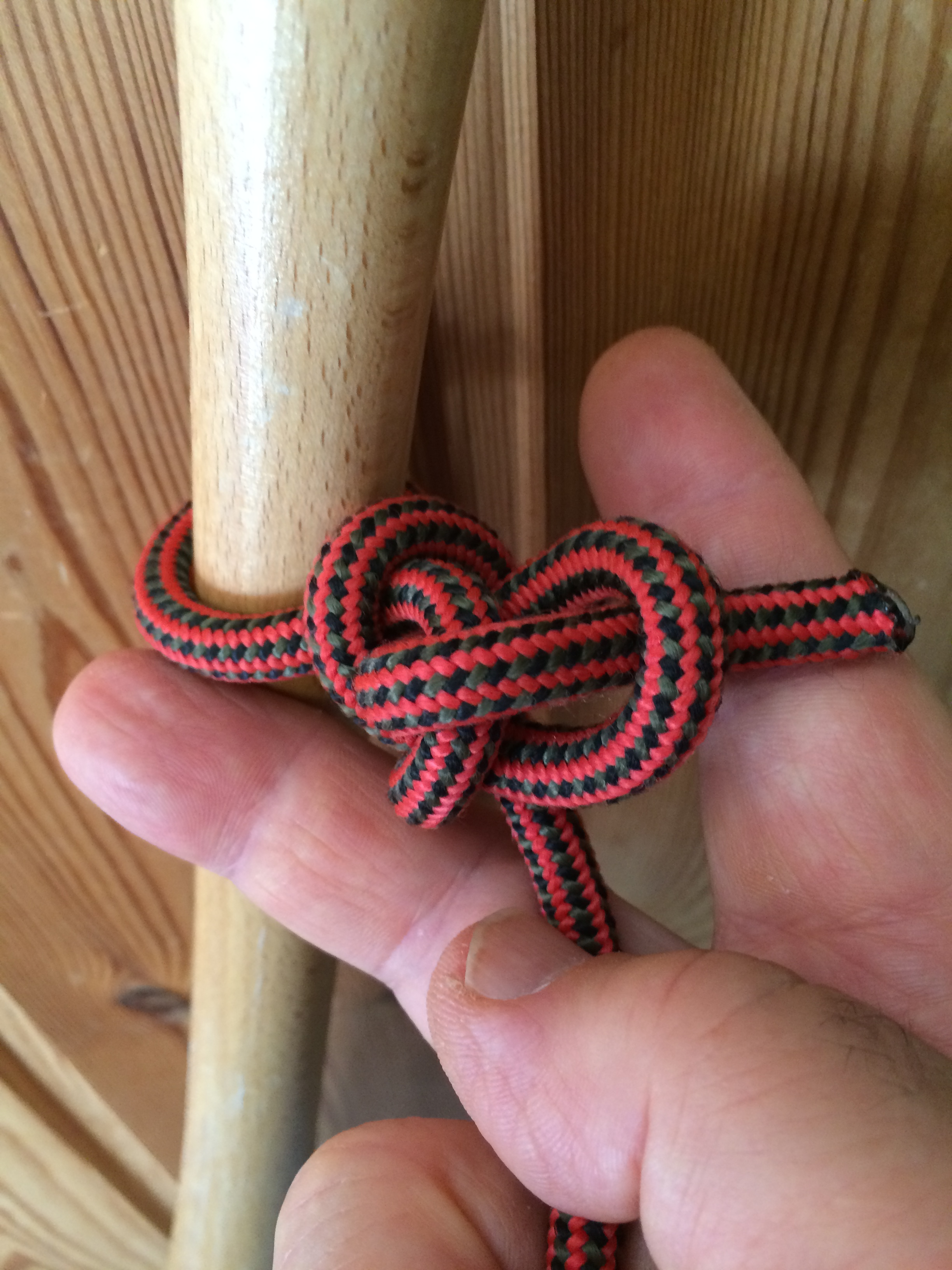
Falconer's knot 6 : Locked

== See also ==
- List of knots
