= Farrimond friction hitch =

Type of knot

Farrimond Friction Hitch
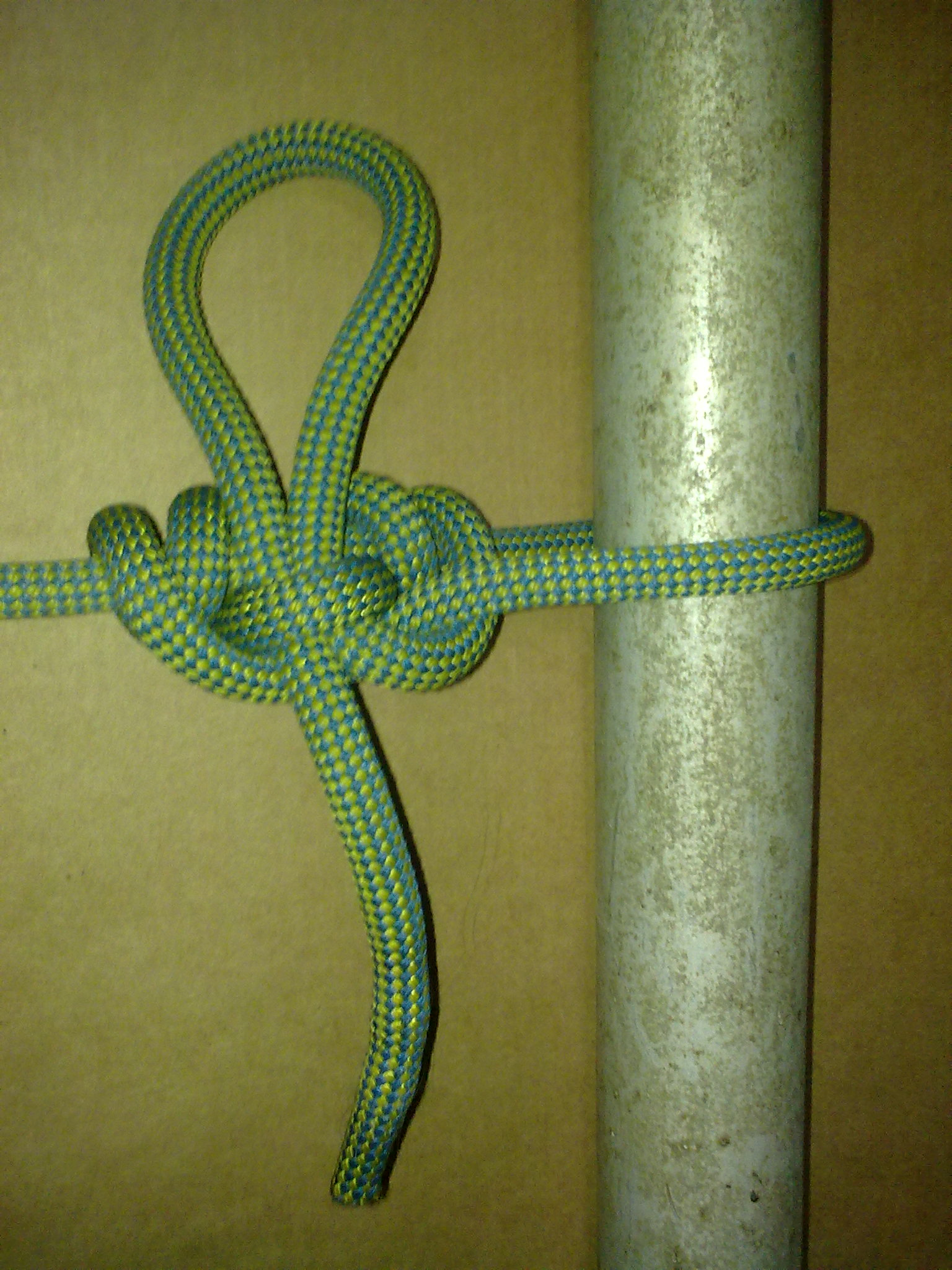
- Category: Hitch
- Origin: Barry Farrimond MBE 2008
- Related: Taut-line hitch, Prusik knot, Siberian hitch
- Releasing: Quick release
- Typical use: Camping, Adjusting line tension

The Farrimond friction hitch is a quick release adjustable friction hitch for use on lines under tension. It is useful when the length of a line will need to be periodically adjusted in order to maintain or adjust tension whilst remaining quick and easy to untie; such as when hanging the ridge line for a Basha. It can be used in very effective conjunction with the Siberian hitch for this purpose. It can also be used as a mooring knot.

== History ==
The first known presentation of this knot was made by British actor Barry Farrimond MBE in 2008 during a demonstration at the Yellow Wood Bush Camp, Wales.

== Tying ==
The diagram below is shown from a birds eye perspective with the green dot representing a fixed point such as a tree or post which a ridge line might be attached to. After passing the working end around the back of this fixed point, create a loop that is then placed on top of the ridge line as in fig 1. Once this has been done take the loop and wrap it around the ridge line (following the directions shown by the red arrows) until you reach fig 4. Next take the working end of the rope and create a bight in it. Follow the red arrow in fig 4 which shows the bight being passed under and through the hoop of rope to form the knot's quick release mechanism. Once the knot has been tightened up it should be able to resist considerable load on the ridge line whilst remaining easy to adjust and quick to release.

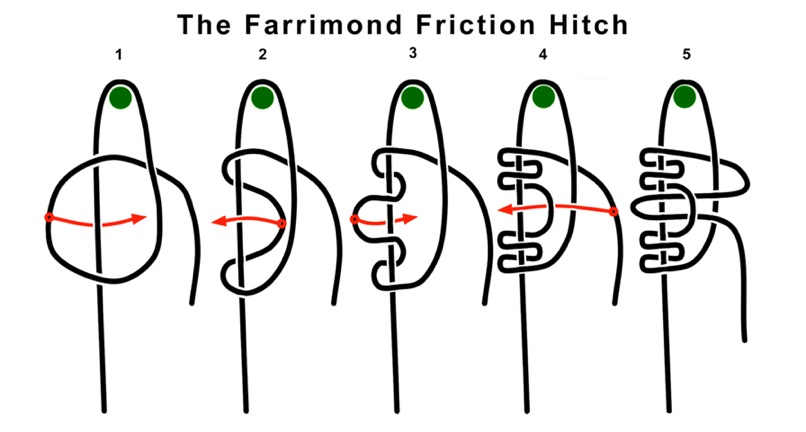

== See also ==
- List of friction hitch knots
- List of knots
- Prusik
- Siberian hitch
