= Slippery hitch =

Knot

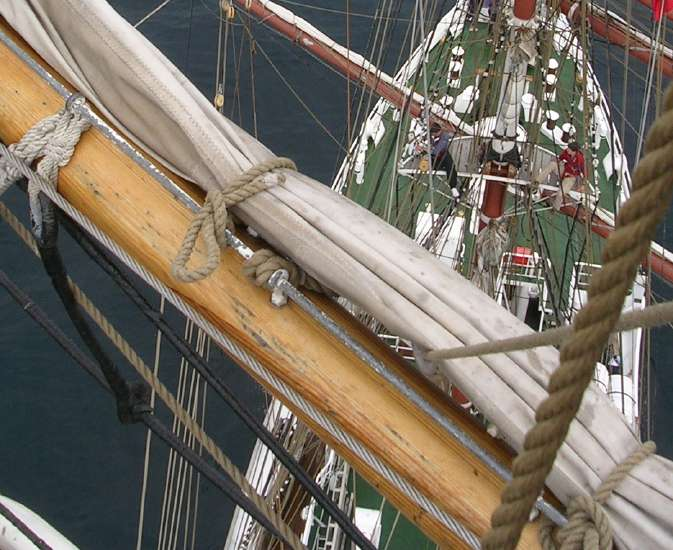
- Category: Hitch
- Related: clove hitch
- Typical use: To attach a line to a rod or bar.

A slippery hitch is a knot used to attach a line to a rod or bar. It does not provide great strength compared to some other knots, but it can be tied relatively quickly and released very easily. These characteristics mean that it is used on square-rigged ships for securing the gaskets that bind stowed sails to the yards.

The slippery hitch is effectively a clove hitch finished with a slipped loop. To tie one, begin as for a clove hitch, but instead of passing the end of the line through the loop in the final step, pass a bight instead, leaving the end on the original side. Pulling on this end will release the hitch. If tied in a gasket, this will quickly release the sail.

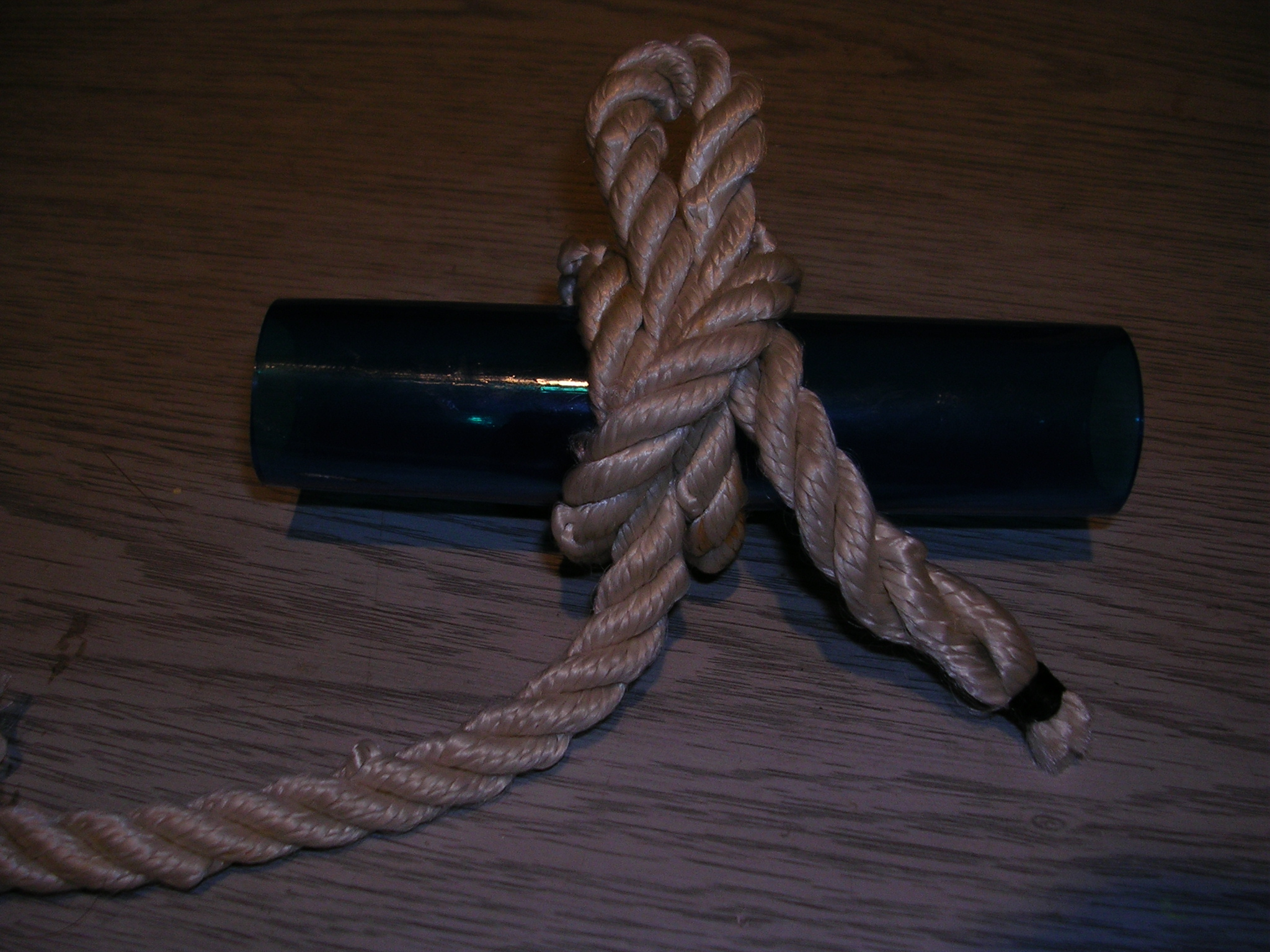
A slippery hitch – a clove hitch with a loop in the end.

== See also ==
- List of knots
