= List of knots =

This list of knots includes many alternative names for common knots and lashings. Knot names have evolved over time, and there are many conflicting or confusing naming issues. The overhand knot, for example, is also known as the thumb knot. The figure-eight knot is also known as the Savoy knot or the Flemish knot.

== A ==
- Aberdeen knot - preferred for closure of intradermal sutures
- Adjustable bend – can be easily lengthened or shortened
- Adjustable grip hitch – a simple hitch which may easily be shifted up and down the rope while slack
- Albright special – used to tie two different diameters of line together, for instance to tie monofilament to braid
- Alpine butterfly (also known as a butterfly loop) – a static loop mostly used by mountain climbers and rappellers for securing a carabiner to static rope
- Alternate ring hitching – covering a ring in hitching can prevent damage
- Anchor bend – attaching a rope to a ring or similar termination
- Angler's loop – knot which forms a fixed loop. Useful for fine or slippery line, it is one of the few loop knots which holds well in bungee cord
- Arbor knot – attach fishing line to the arbor of a fishing reel
- Artillery loop a.k.a. a Manharness knot – a knot with a loop on the bight for non-critical purposes
- Ashley's bend – used to securely join the ends of two ropes together
- Ashley's stopper knot – trefoil-faced stopper at the end of the rope
- Axle hitch – used to tie a hitch in a hard-to-reach place

== B ==
- Bachmann knot – friction hitch useful when the knot needs to be reset quickly/often
- Bag knot (miller's knot) – binding knot used to secure the opening of a sack or bag
- Bait loop (bumper knot) – secures soft or loose bait in fishing
- Bale sling hitch – continuous loop of strap to form a cow hitch around an object
- Barrel hitch (barrel sling) – suspends an object
- Barrel knot (blood knot) – joins sections of monofilament nylon line while maintaining much of the line's inherent strength
- Basket weave knot – a family of bend and lanyard knots with a regular pattern
- Becket hitch – any hitch made on an eye loop
- Beer knot – bend used in tubular webbing as in slings used in rock climbing
- Bimini twist – fishing knot used for offshore trolling and sportsfishing
- Blackwall hitch – temporary means of attaching a rope to a hook
- Blake's hitch – friction hitch commonly used by arborists and tree climbers as an ascending knot
- Blimp knot (Zeppelin bend)
- Blood knot (barrel knot) – joins sections of monofilament nylon line while maintaining much of the line's inherent strength
- Blood loop knot (dropper loop) – forms a loop which is off to the side of the line
- Boa knot – binding knot
- Boom hitch – attach a line to a fixed object like a pipe
- Bottle sling (jug sling) – used to create a handle for a container with a narrow tapering neck
- Bourchier knot – a variety of heraldic knot
- Bowen knot (heraldic knot) – not a true knot (an unknot), a continuous loop of rope laid out as an upright square shape with loops at each of the four corners
- Bowline – forms a fixed loop at the end of a rope
- Boling knot (archaic term for the Bowline) – forms a fixed loop at the end of a rope
- Bowline bend
- Bowline on a bight – makes a pair of fixed-size loops in the middle of a rope
- Bumper knot – secures soft or loose bait in fishing
- Bunny ears (double figure-eight loop)
- Buntline hitch – attach a rope to an object
- Butterfly bend – connects two ends of rope
- Butterfly coil – a method for storing and transporting a climbing rope
- Butterfly loop – forms a fixed loop in the middle of a rope

== C ==
- Carrick bend – joins two lines of heavy rope or cable
- Carrick bend loop – used to make a loop at the end of a rope
- Carrick mat – flat woven decorative knot which can be used as a mat or pad
- Cat's paw – connects a rope to an object
- Catshank – variant of the sheepshank, clinched by two overhand knots with the bights passed through the twists
- Celtic button knot – a spherical decorative knot
- Chain sinnet – method of shortening a rope or other cable
- Chain stitch – a sewing and embroidery technique in which a series of looped stitches form a chain-like pattern
- Chair knot (Fireman's chair knot) – knot tied in the bight forming two adjustable, lockable loops
- Chinese button knot – a decorative knot
- Cleat hitch
- Clove hitch – two successive half-hitches around an object
- Common whipping – series of knots intended to stop a rope from unraveling
- Constrictor knot – one of the most effective binding knots
- Continuous ring hitching (Ringbolt hitching) – series of identical hitches made around a ring
- Corned beef knot – binding knot often used for binding the meat of the same name while it is being cooked
- Cow hitch – hitch knot used to attach a rope to an object
- Cow hitch and bowline (bale sling hitch or strap hitch) – uses a continuous loop of strap to form a cow hitch around an object in order to hoist or lower it
- Cross constrictor knot – a variant of the Constrictor knot
- Crown knot – a knot made in the strands of the end of a rope – the start of a back splice
- Cowboy bowline – variation of the bowline loop knot

== D ==
- Diagonal lashing – lashing to bind spars or poles together to prevent racking
- Diamond hitch – lashing technique used mainly in the field of equine packing, to secure a set of objects
- Diamond knot (knife lanyard knot) – for forming a decorative loop on the end of a cord
- Directional figure eight (inline figure-eight loop) – loop knot that can be made on the bight
- Distel hitch – secure friction hitch used for rope climbing
- Dogshank – variant of the sheepshank where the eyes formed at each end have the ends of the rope passed through
- Donkey’s bane – variation on the diamond knot
- Double anchorman knot – two or more pieces of rope joined together
- Double bowline (round turn bowline) – loop knot that uses a round turn
- Double carrick bend – join two lines together
- Double constrictor knot – binding knot that can be difficult to untie once tightened
- Double Englishman's knot (double fisherman's knot) – joins two lengths of rope
- Double figure eight knot
- Double figure eight bend (Flemish bend) – joins two ropes of roughly similar size
- Double figure-eight loop – forms two parallel loops
- Double figure eight (stevedore knot) – bulky stopper knot often tied near the end of a rope that is secure-when-slack
- Double fisherman's knot (grapevine knot) – joins two lengths of rope
- Double loop (surgeon's loop) – for making loops at the end of lines similar to the Surgeon's knot, but with a double strand
- Double overhand knot – extension of the regular overhand knot, made with one additional pass
- Double overhand noose – hitch knot used to bind a rope to a carabiner
- Double pile hitch – attaches a rope to a pole or other structure
- Double ring knot
- Double sheet bend – doubles a sheet bend by making an additional round turn below the first and again bringing the working end back under itself
- Double windsor (for use in neckties) – method of tying a necktie around one's neck and collar
- Dropper loop – forms a loop which is off to the side of the line
- Dutch bend, useful for tying multiple lines together
- Dutch marine bowline (cowboy bowline) – variation of the bowline loop knot

== E ==
- Egg loop a.k.a. bumper knot – secures soft or loose bait in fishing applications
- Elusive knot
- Englishman's knot (fisherman's knot) – a bend consisting of two overhand knots, each tied around the standing part of the other
- Eskimo bowline – places a loop in the end of a rope
- Eskimo bowstring loop knot
- European death knot (one-sided overhand bend) – joins two ropes together
- Eye splice – creates a permanent loop in the end of multi stranded rope by means of rope splicing

== F ==
- Falconer's knot – used in falconry to tether a bird of prey to a perch
- Farmer's loop – midline loop knot made with a bight
- Farrimond friction hitch – quick release adjustable friction hitch for use on lines under tension
- Fiador knot – decorative, symmetrical knot used in equine applications
- Figure-eight knot a.k.a. savoy knot, Flemish knot – type of knot created by a loop on the bight
- Figure-eight loop – type of knot created by a loop on the bight
- Figure-of-nine loop – forms a fixed loop in a rope
- Fireman's chair knot – knot tied in the bight forming two adjustable, lockable loops
- Firm knot - Knots that hold firm under a variety of adverse conditions are said to be more secure than those that do not
- Fisherman's bend (anchor bend) – used for attaching a rope to a ring or similar termination
- Fisherman's knot – knot for joining two lines with a symmetrical structure consisting of two overhand knots, each tied around the standing part of the other
- Fisherman's loop
- Flemish bend – knot for joining two ropes of roughly similar size
- Flemish knot a.k.a. figure-eight knot, savoy knot – knot for joining two ropes of roughly similar size
- French bowline – variant of the bowline with two loops
- French Machard knot – see Klemheist knot
- Friendship knot – decorative square knot used to tie a neckerchief and in Chinese knotting
- Friendship knot loop – a knot to tie a loop at the end of a rope

== G ==
- Garda hitch (alpine clutch) climbing knot that lets the rope move in only one direction
- Girth hitch (cow hitch)
- Good luck knot
- Gordian knot – (mythical knot) an inextricable/complicated knot, tied by King Gordius of Phrygia, that Alexander the Great cut with a sword
- Grantchester knot – a method of tying a necktie
- Granny knot – secures a rope or line around an object
- Grief knot – (what knot) combines features of granny knot and thief knot
- Gripping sailor's hitch – used to tie one rope to another, or a rope to a pole, when the pull is lengthwise along the object
- Ground-line hitch – attaches a rope to an object

== H ==
- Half blood knot (clinch knot) – for securing a fishing line to a fishing lure, snap or swivel
- Half hitch – simple overhand knot, where the working end of a line is brought over and under the standing part
- Half-Windsor knot – knot used for tying neckties
- Halter hitch – connects a rope to an object
- Halyard bend – a way to attach the end of a rope at right angle to a cylindrical object
- Hammock hitch
- Handcuff knot – tied in the bight, having two adjustable loops in opposing directions
- Hangman's noose (hangman's knot) – well-known knot most often associated with its use in hanging a person
- Harness bend – used to join two ropes together
- Harness hitch (artillery loop) – knot with a loop on the bight for non-critical purposes
- Heaving line knot
- Heaving line bend – used to attach playing strings to the thick silk eyes of the anchorage knot
- Highpoint hitch – used to attach a rope to an object
- Highwayman's hitch – insecure, quick-release, draw loop hitch for trivial use
- Hitching tie – simple knot used to tie off drawstring bags that allows quick access
- Honda knot a.k.a. lariat loop – loop knot commonly used in a lasso
- Hoxton knot – a method of arranging a scarf about the neck
- Hunter's bend a.k.a. rigger's bend – joins two lines

== I ==
- Icicle hitch – excellent for connecting to a post when weight is applied to an end running parallel to the post in a specific direction
- Improved clinch knot – used for securing a fishing line to the fishing lure
- In-line figure-eight loop (directional figure eight) – loop knot that can be made on the bight
- Italian hitch (Munter hitch) – simple knot commonly used by climbers and cavers as part of a life-lining or belay system

== J ==
- Jack Ketch's knot (hangman's knot) – well-known knot most often associated with its use in hanging a person
- Jamming knot – for constricting a bundle of objects
- Jug sling a.k.a. bottle sling – used to create a handle for a glass or ceramic container with a slippery, narrow, tapering neck
- Jury mast knot – for jury rigging a temporary mast on a sailboat or ship

== K ==
- Karash double loop – A knot used to form leg loops as a makeshift harness
- Killick hitch – hitch knot used to attach a rope to oddly shaped objects
- Klemheist knot – a.k.a French Machard knot or just Machard knot. Friction hitch that grips a rope when weight is applied, and is free to move when the weight is released
- Knot of isis – ancient Egyptian symbol of the goddess Isis; similar to a knot used to secure the garments that the Egyptian gods wore
- Knotless knot
- Knute hitch

== L ==
- Lariat loop a.k.a. honda knot – loop knot commonly used in a lasso
- Lark's foot (Lark's head, cow hitch) used to attach a rope to an object
- Lapp knot
- Left-hand bowline (cowboy bowline) – variation of the bowline loop knot
- Ligature knot a.k.a. surgeon's knot – simple modification to the reef knot that adds an extra twist when tying the first throw
- Lighterman's hitch (tugboat hitch) – ideal for heavy towing, or making fast to a post, bollard, or winch
- Lineman's loop (butterfly loop) – used to form a fixed loop in the middle of a rope
- Lissajous knot – knot defined by parametric equations
- Lobster buoy hitch – similar to the buntline hitch, but made with a cow hitch around the standing part rather than a clove hitch

== M ==
- Machard knot – see Klemheist knot
- Magnus hitch (rolling hitch) – used to attach a rope to a rod, pole, or other rope
- Manharness knot (artillery loop) – knot with a loop on the bight for non-critical purposes
- Matthew Walker knot – decorative knot that is used to keep the end of a rope from fraying
- Marlinespike hitch – temporary knot used to attach a rod to a rope in order to form a handle
- Marline hitching
- Midshipman's hitch – similar to the (taut-line hitch) – adjustable loop knot for use on lines under tension
- Miller's knot – binding knot used to secure the opening of a sack or bag
- Monkey's fist – looks somewhat like a small bunched fist/paw, most often used as the weight in a heaving line
- Mountaineer's coil – method used by climbers for carrying a rope
- Munter hitch – simple knot commonly used by climbers and cavers as part of a life-lining or belay system

== N ==
- Nail knot – used in fly fishing to attach the leader to the fly line
- Nicky knot – a method of tying a necktie
- Noose – loop at the end of a rope in which the knot slides to make the loop collapsible

== O ==
- Offset figure-eight bend – a poor knot that has been implicated in the deaths of several rock climbers
- One-sided overhand bend – used to join two ropes together
- Ossel hitch – used to attach a rope or line to an object
- Overhand bend – used to join two ropes together
- Overhand knot a.k.a. thumb knot – fundamental knot that forms the basis of many others
- Overhand knot with draw-loop – knot in which the weight of the load depresses the loop to keep it in place
- Overhand loop – forms a fixed loop in a rope
- Overhand noose
- Oysterman's stopper knot (Ashley's stopper knot) – trefoil-faced stopper at the end of the rope

== P ==
- Packer's knot – binding knot which is easily pulled taut and quickly locked in position
- Palomar knot – used for securing a fishing line to a fishing lure, snap or swivel
- Pan Chang knot
- Pile hitch – used for attaching rope to a pole or other structure
- Pipe hitch – hitch-type knot used to secure pipes/poles
- Plafond knot
- Poldo tackle – an instant tension-applying and tension-releasing mechanism in rope
- Pratt knot – a method of tying a tie around one's neck and collar
- Pretzel link knot – in knot theory, a branch of mathematics, a pretzel link is a special kind of link
- Prusik knot – friction hitch or knot used to put a loop of cord around a rope
- Portuguese bowline a.k.a. French bowline – variant of the bowline with two loops that are adjustable in size
- Portuguese whipping – a type of whipping knot
- Power cinch (trucker's hitch) – commonly used for securing loads on trucks or trailers
- Purcell prusik

== Q ==
- Quick-release knot (Highwayman's hitch) – insecure, quick-release, draw loop hitch for trivial use

== R ==
- Racking bend – knot for joining two ropes of different diameter
- Radium release hitch
- Reef knot – simple binding knot used to secure a rope or line around an object
- Reever Knot – a secure and compact bend for joining two lines
- Rigger's bend a.k.a. Hunter's bend – used to join two lines
- Rigid double splayed loop in the bight – knot that contains two parallel loops
- Ringbolt hitching
- Ring bend (water knot) – for joining two ends of webbing together
- Ring hitch (cow hitch) – used to attach a rope to an object
- Rolling hitch – knot used to attach a rope to a rod, pole, or other rope
- Rose knot – decorative stopper knot
- Rosendahl bend (Zeppelin bend) – general purpose bend knot unique in the ease with which it is untied, even after heavy loading
- Round lashing
- Round turn and two half-hitches – hitch used to secure the end of a rope to a fixed object
- Round turn
- Running bowline
- Running highwayman's hitch
- Running knot (slip knot) – knots which attach a line to an object and tighten when tension is applied to the free end of the line

== S ==
- Sailor's hitch – a secure, jam-proof hitch
- Sailor's knot a.k.a. carrick bend – used for joining two lines
- San Diego Jam knot – a common fishing knot
- Savoy knot a.k.a. figure-eight knot, Flemish knot – decorative, heraldic knot
- Shear lashing
- Sheepshank – used to shorten or store rope
- Sheet bend – joins two ropes together
- Shoelace knot – commonly used for tying shoelaces and bow-ties
- Shroud knot – a multi-strand bend knot used to join two ends of laid (or twisted) rope together
- Siberian hitch – used to attach a rope to an object
- Simple knot – (four-in-hand knot) a method of tying a necktie
- Simple Simon over – used for joining two lines
- Simple Simon under – used for joining two lines. It is more secure than the similar Simple Simon over.
- Single carrick bend – refers to different knots similar to the Carrick bend
- Single hitch – an overhand knot tied around or through an object
- Slack line hitch
- Slip knot – knots which attach a line to an object and tighten when tension is applied; a type of knot designed to bind one end of a rope to the middle of another
- Slipped buntline hitch – used for attaching a rope to an object
- Slipped half hitch – temporary attachment of rope to object
- Slippery eight loop – adjustable loop knot
- Slippery hitch – used to attach a line to a rod or bar
- Snell knot – a hitch knot used to attach an eyed fishing hook to fishing line
- Snuggle hitch – a modification of the clove hitch
- Span loop – non-jamming loop that can be tied in the middle of a rope
- Spanish bowline – double loop knot
- Splice – the forming of a semi-permanent joint between two ropes
- Square knot (American usage) or reef knot (British usage) – used to secure a rope or line around an object
- Square lashing – used to bind poles together
- Square Turk's head – decorative knot with a variable number of interwoven strands, forming a closed loop
- Stein knot – variation of the Figure-eight knot
- Stevedore knot – a stopper knot often tied near the end of a rope
- Strangle knot – a simple binding knot
- Strap hitch (bale sling hitch) – uses a continuous loop of strap to form a cow hitch around an object
- Surgeon's knot a.k.a. ligature knot – modification to the reef knot
- Surgeon's loop – similar to the surgeon's knot but with a double strand
- Swing hitch

== T ==
- Tack knot
- Tape knot (water knot) – frequently used in climbing for joining two ends of webbing together
- Tarbuck knot – used by climbers and was primarily used with stranded nylon rope
- Taut-line hitch – adjustable loop knot for use on lines under tension
- Tensionless hitch – an anchor knot used for rappelling or rope rescue.
- Tent hitch (taut-line hitch) – adjustable loop knot for use on lines under tension
- Thief knot – resembles the reef knot except that the free, or working, ends are on opposite sides
- Threefoil knot – another term for a trefoil knot
- Thumb knot a.k.a. overhand knot – one of the most fundamental knots and forms the basis of many others
- Timber hitch – used to attach a single length of rope to a cylindrical object
- Tom fool's knot – good knot with which to commence a slightly fancy sheepshank
- Transom knot – to secure two linear objects, such as spars, at right angles to each other
- Trefoil knot – simplest example of a nontrivial knot in mathematics
- Trident loop – fixed loop knot
- Trilene knot – a multi purpose fishing knot
- Triple bowline – variation of the bowline knot that is used to create three loops on one knot simultaneously
- Triple crown knot – non-communicating double loop knot. It is secure and symmetrical, but can jam when tightened.
- Triple fisherman's knot – a bend knot used to join two ends of rope together
- Trucker's hitch – used for securing loads on trucks or trailers
- True lover's knot – a name which has been used for many distinct knots
- Tugboat hitch – ideal for heavy towing, or making fast to a post, bollard, or winch
- Turle knot – used while fishing for tying a hook or fly to a leader
- Twined Turk's head – decorative knot with a variable number of interwoven strands forming a closed loop
- Tumble hitch
- Two half-hitches – an overhand knot tied around a post, followed by a half-hitch
- Two strand overhand knot (one-sided overhand bend) – used to join two ropes together

== U ==
- Underhand knot – another name for a trefoil knot
- Underwriter's knot
- Uni knot – fishing knot used to attach fishing line to the arbor of a reel

== V ==
- Versatackle knot – simulates a block and tackle without actual pulleys or deadeyes
- Vibration-proof hitch – used for fastening a line or rope to a solid object

== W ==
- Wagoner's hitch – compound knot commonly used for securing loads on trucks or trailers
- Wall knot
- Wall and crown knot – used at the end of the ropes on either side of a gangway leading onto a ship
- Water bowline – type of knot designed for use in wet conditions where other knots may slip or jam
- Water knot – frequently used in climbing for joining two ends of webbing together
- Waterman's knot – a bend with a symmetrical structure consisting of two overhand knots, each tied around the standing part of the other
- West Country whipping – uses twine to secure the end of a rope to prevent it fraying
- Windsor knot – a symmetrical knot used for tying a necktie around one's neck and collar

== Y ==
- Yosemite bowline – a medium security loop knot

== Z ==
- Zeppelin bend – a secure, easily tied, and a jam-proof way to connect two ropes
- Zeppelin loop – (Rosendahl Loop) a secure, jam-resistant end loop
- Zigzag knot

== Sub-lists, by type ==
- List of bend knots
- List of binding knots
- List of climbing knots
- List of coil knots
- List of decorative knots
- List of friction hitch knots
- List of hitch knots
- List of loop knots
- List of slip knots
- List of splices
- List of stopper knots
- List of trick knots

== See also ==
- The Ashley Book of Knots
- List of knot terminology
- List of mathematical knots and links
