= Poldo tackle =

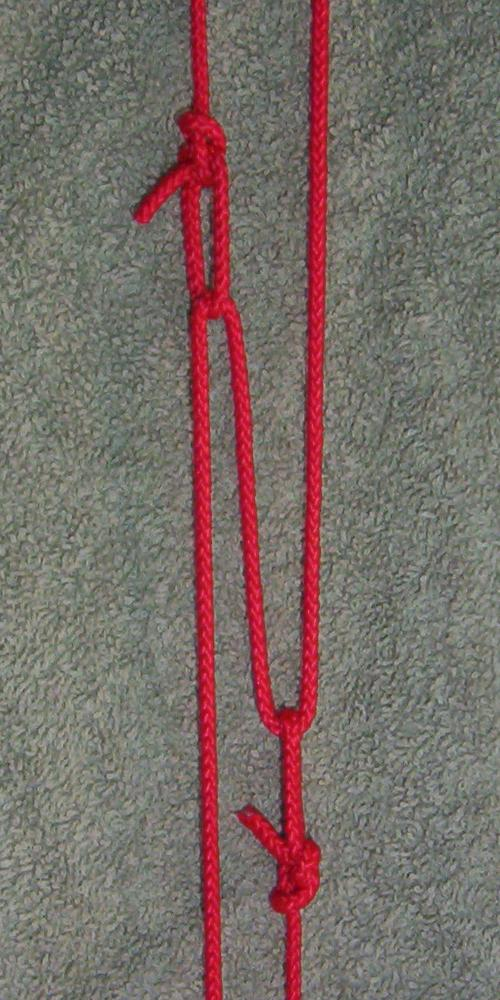

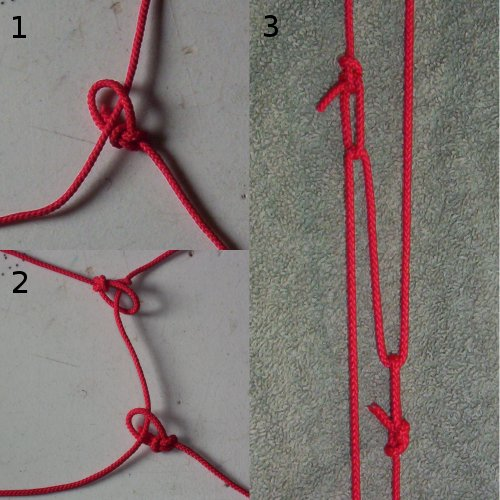
How to make a poldo tackle.

The poldo tackle is a peculiar tension-applying and tension-releasing mechanism.

== See also ==
- List of knots
- Versatackle knot
