= Surgeon's loop =

Type of knot

- Names: Surgeon's loop, Gut Knot
- ABoK: 292

The Surgeon's loop (a.k.a. Double Loop) is tied the same way as the surgeon's knot but with a double strand. Therefore, this knot does use more line than most. It is a bit bulky but is great for making quick, strong loops at the end of lines and leaders for connecting to other loops.

== See also ==
- List of knots
