= Tarbuck knot =

Obsolete climbing knot

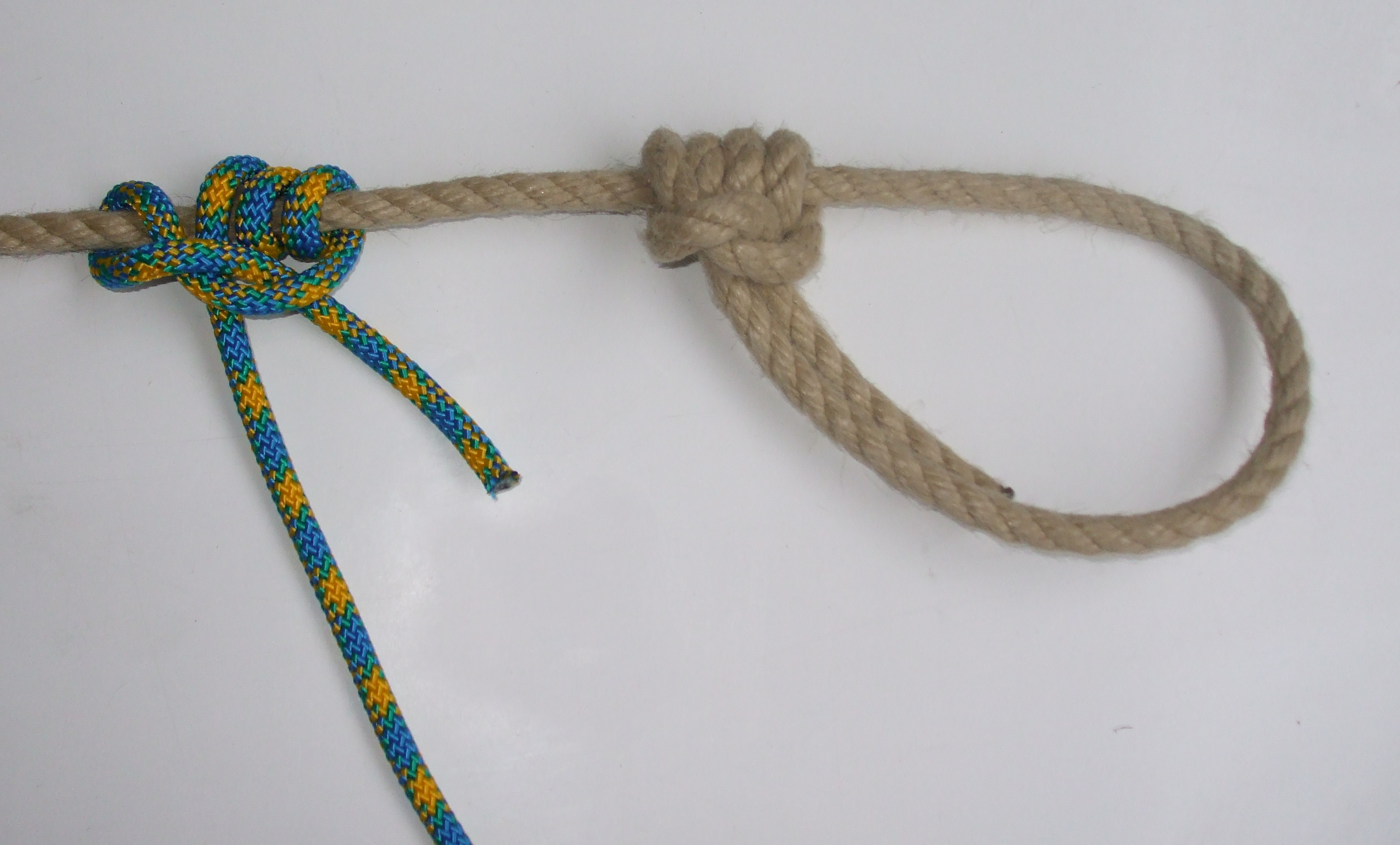
- Category: Running
- Efficiency: 32%
- Origin: Kenneth Tarbuck
- Releasing: Non-jamming
- Typical use: Climbing (obsolete)
- Caveat: The knot grips adequately, but under sudden stress will slide to a limited extent thus reducing shock loading.

The Tarbuck knot is a now-obsolete knot that was made popular around 1952 by Kenneth Tarbuck, a climber and skier, for use by climbers, and was primarily used with stranded nylon ropes, before the advent of kernmantle ropes made this use both unnecessary and unsafe. It was used when the rope is subject to heavy or sudden loads, as it will slide to a limited extent thus reducing shock (but with kernmantle ropes it can strip the outer sheath). The knot was already employed by 1946 as "the knot" by American tree trimmers.

== See also ==
- List of knots
