= Halyard bend =

Type of knot

Studding-Sail Bend
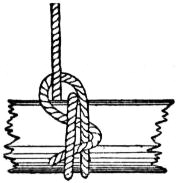
- Names: Studding-Sail Bend, Studding-sail Halyard Bend
- Category: Hitch
- ABoK: #1678

Studding-Sail Bend is a way to attach the end of a rope at right angle to a cylindrical object such as a beam.

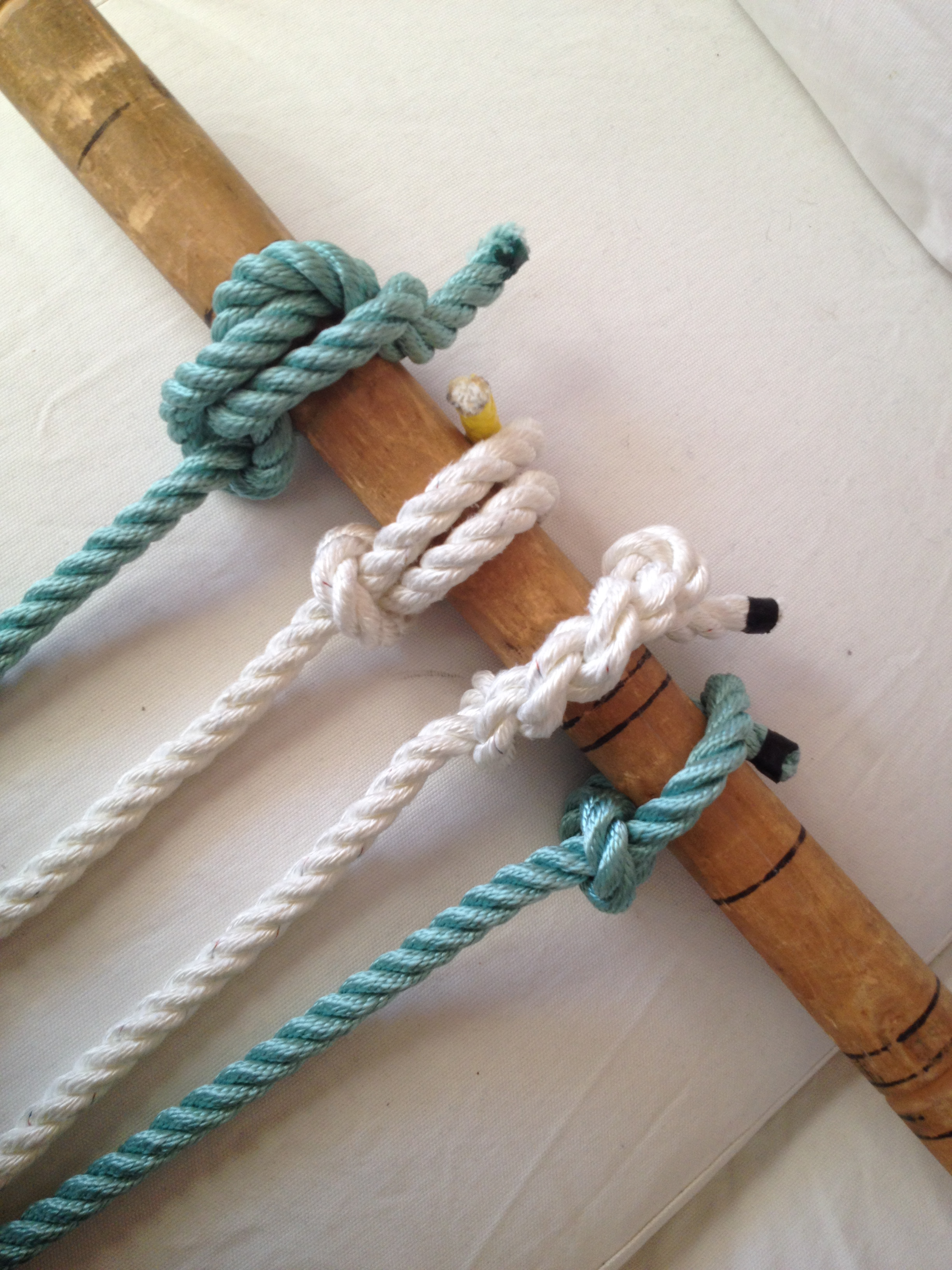
Halyard bend (upper left), timber hitch (lower right)

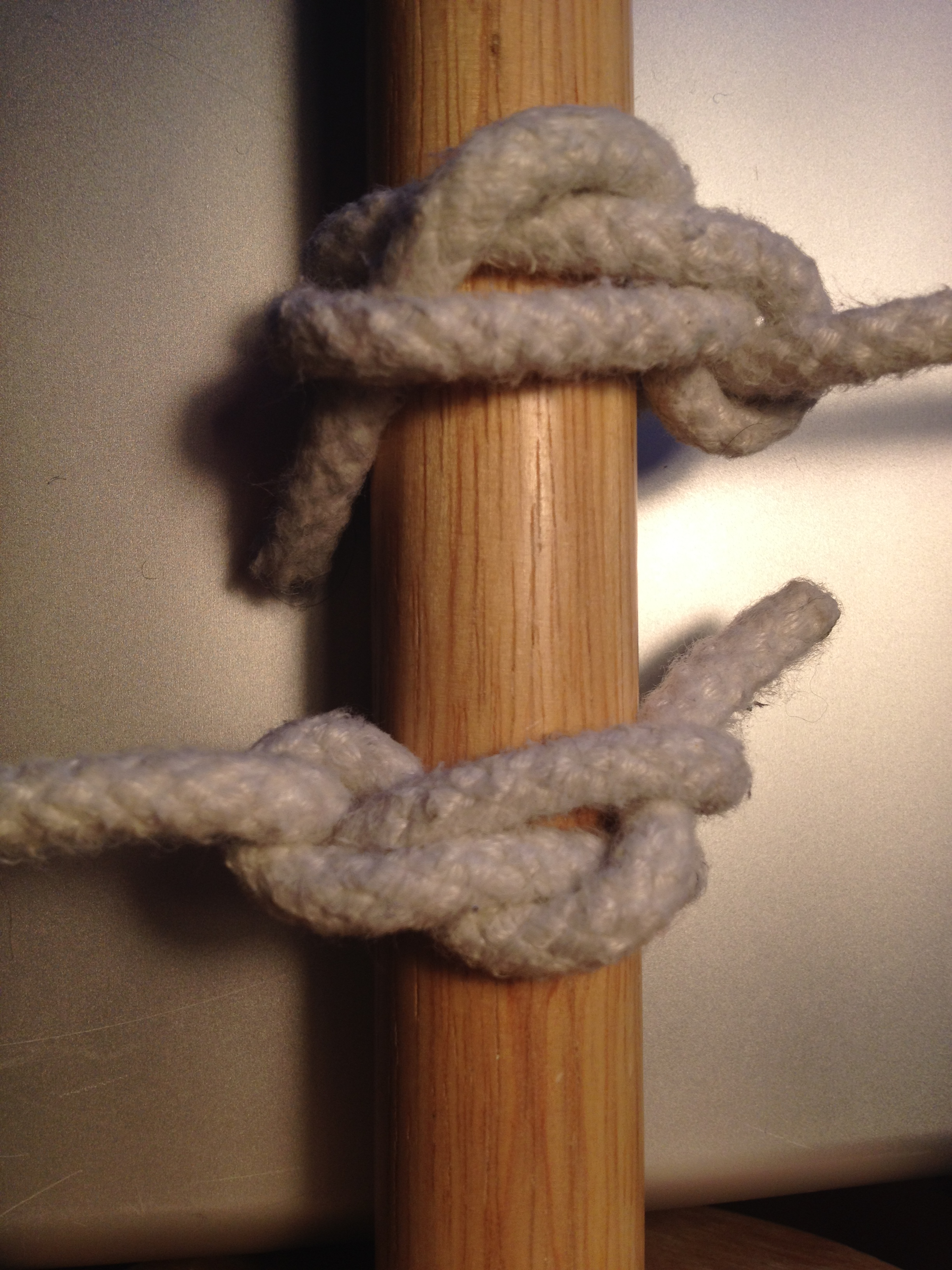
Halyard bend

== Tying ==
1. wrap the end two or more times around the object
2. make the end hook around the standing part and under all wrappings, to come out by the last wrap
3. make the end turn back and cross over the wrappings, to tuck/pass it under the first wrap

Halyard bend may be considered to be the "double-loop-around, and single-tuck-under" version of timber hitch which itself is usually tied as "single-loop-around, and double-tuck-under".

== See also ==
- List of knots
- Topsail Halyard Bend
- Gaff Topsail Halyard Bend
