= Dropper loop =

Type of loop knot

Dropper loop knot
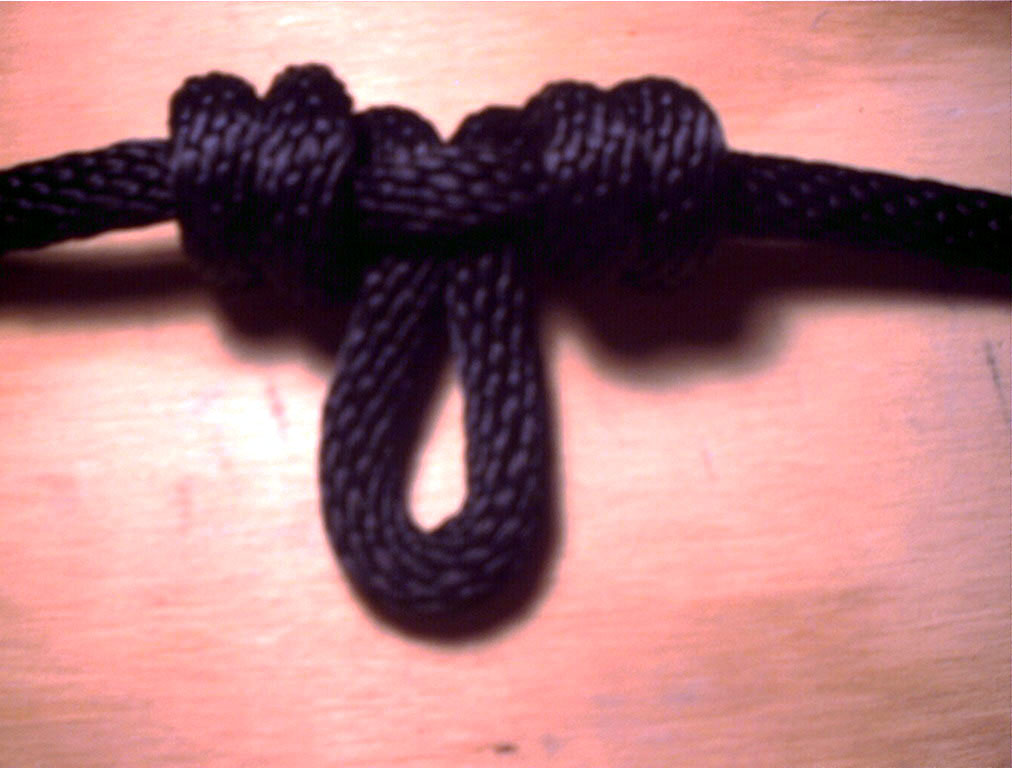
- Names: Dropper loop knot, blood dropper loop blood loop dropper knot
- Category: Loop
- Typical use: Fishing
- ABoK: -
- Instructions

The dropper loop is a type of loop knot often used on multi-hook fishing lines. It can be created in the middle of a long line and forms a loop which is off to the side of the line.

== Techniques ==
There are two main methods of tying the dropper loop.

1. Gather a loop and then twist it around the overlap a few times
2. Form the loop and then use a matchstick to twist up the overlap.

Finally drop the loop through the central twist.

Dropper Loop being formed

== See also ==
- List of knots
