= Slippery eight loop =

Knot

- Category: Loop
- Origin: Dave Poston
- Releasing: Non-jamming

The slippery eight loop is an adjustable loop knot discovered by Dave Poston in 2002.

== Information ==
The slippery eight loop is known — despite the name — to have an extraordinary ability to not slip and it is extremely secure when the legs are at less than a 90-degree angle. The man who created this knot, Dave Poston, requests that the name of the knot include "HFP" in order to honor his father, who originally introduced him to knots. So the whole name of the knot would be the "HFP Slippery 8 Loop."

== Instructions ==
The instructions on how to create a slippery eight loop is as follows:

1. Begin by creating a figure eight knot with one end long enough to be looped through it again
2. Make sure that the figure eight loop is not tight, but rather quite loose with obvious gaps
3. Bring the long, working end to the top of the knot
4. Pass the working end behind the standing line in the knot and feed the end through the Eight
5. After the working end has been threaded through the knot, pull the knot tight
6. Adjust the size of the loop by alternately pulling the different ends or one side of the loop

== See also ==
- List of knots
