= Pile hitch =

Type of knot

Pile Hitch
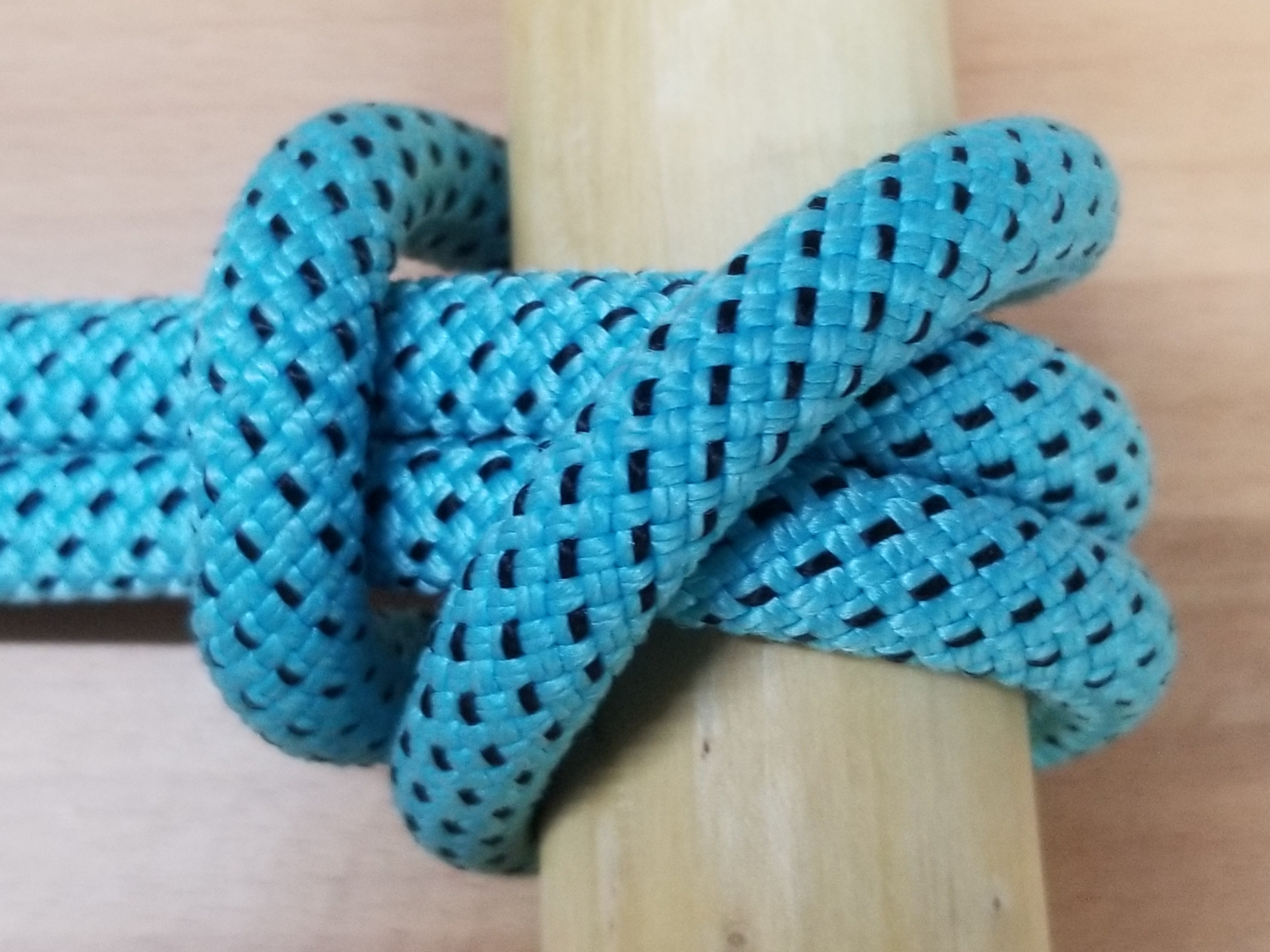
- Category: Hitch
- Related: Marlinspike Hitch, Icicle Hitch
- Releasing: Non jamming
- Typical use: Used as a mooring hitch to attach a line to a dock or post.
- ABoK: #1815

The pile hitch is a kind of hitch, which is a knot used for attaching rope to a pole or other structure. The pile hitch is very easy to tie and can be tied in the bight, without access to either end of the rope, making it a valuable tool.

A pile hitch may be easily and quickly tied either in the end or bight of a heavy line. It is remarkably secure and is easy to cast off when the left bight has been loosened by a single well-aimed kick. Recommended for medium and heavy lines.

— The Ashley Book of Knots

== Tying ==
To tie, form a loop in the bight, and wrap both strands of this loop around the pole near the pole's end. Pull the loop around and under the rope, then finish by putting the loop itself around the end of the pole.

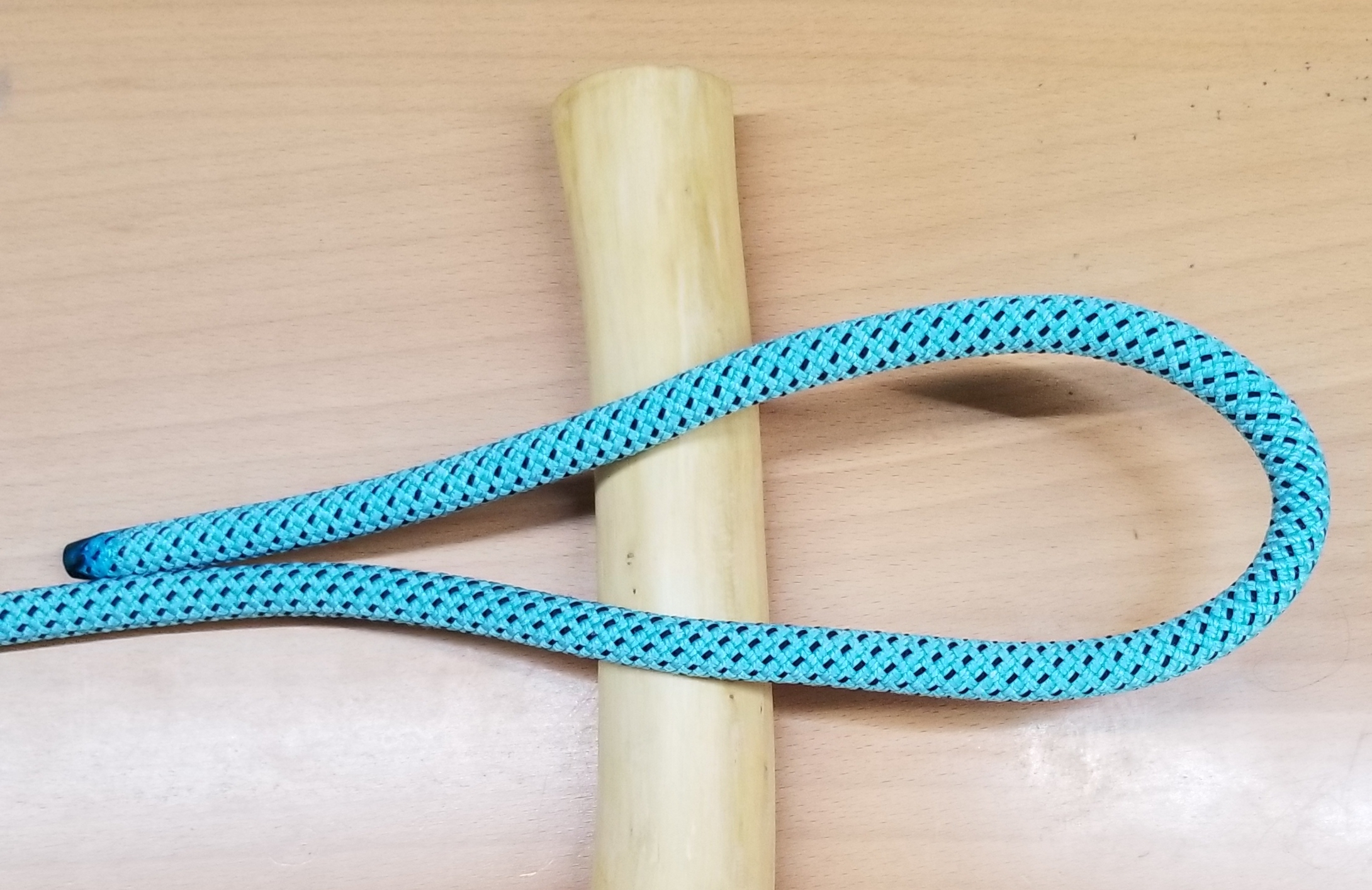
Form a bight and

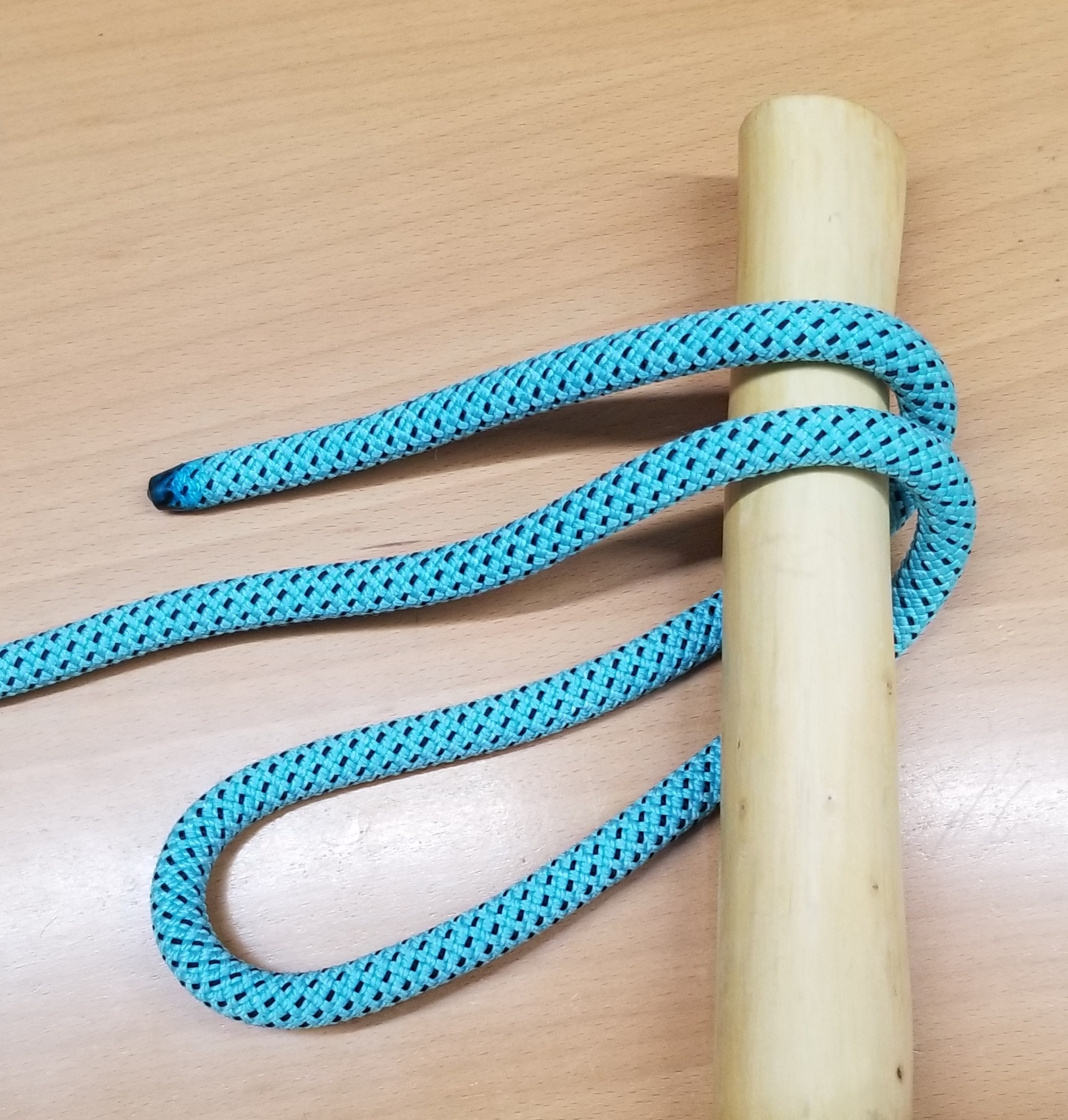
wrap the bight around the pole and under the rope.

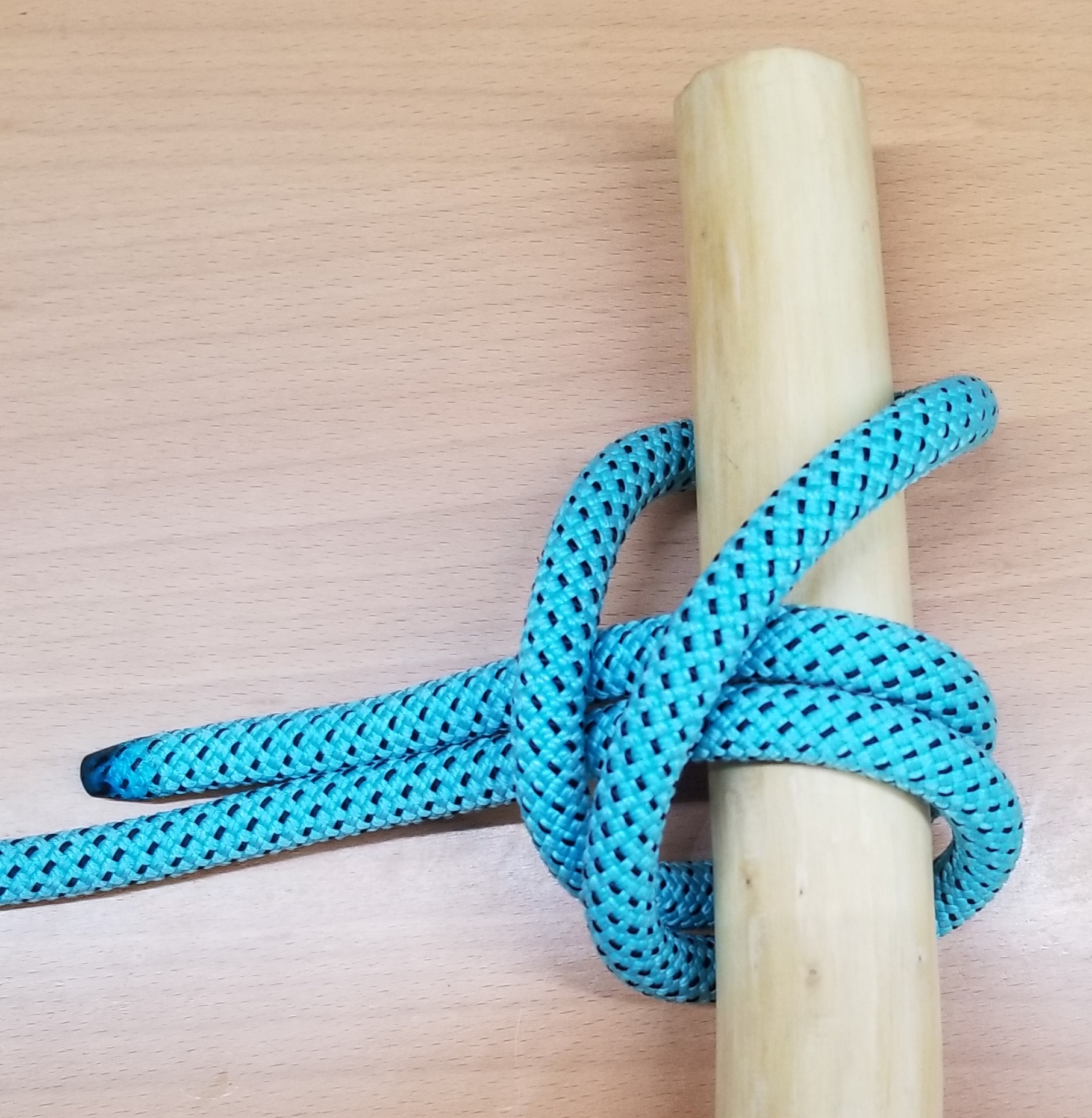
Put the bight itself around the end of the pole.

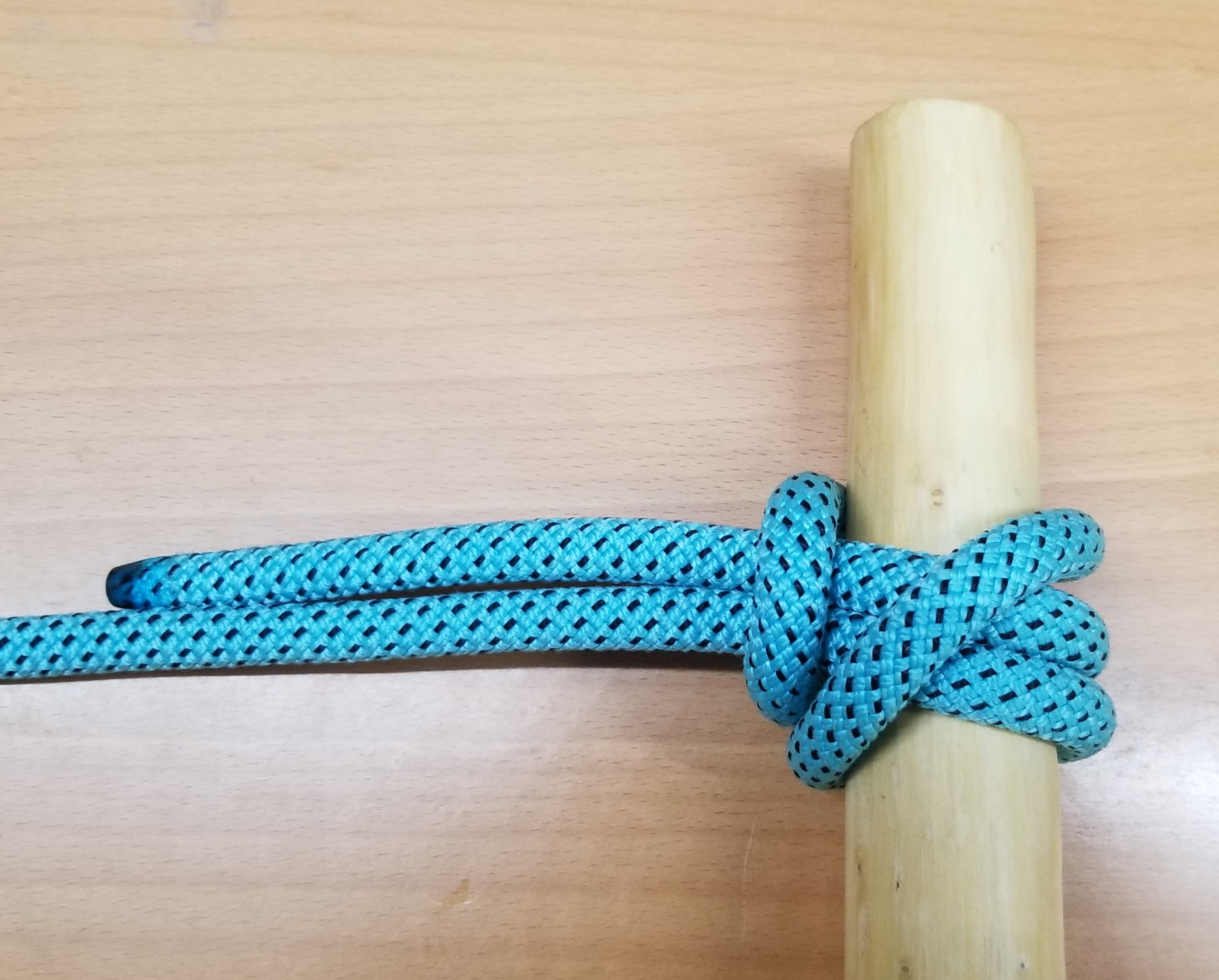
Tighten the hitch and ready.

== See also ==
- List of knots
