= Ringbolt hitching =

Series of protective knots around a heavy ring

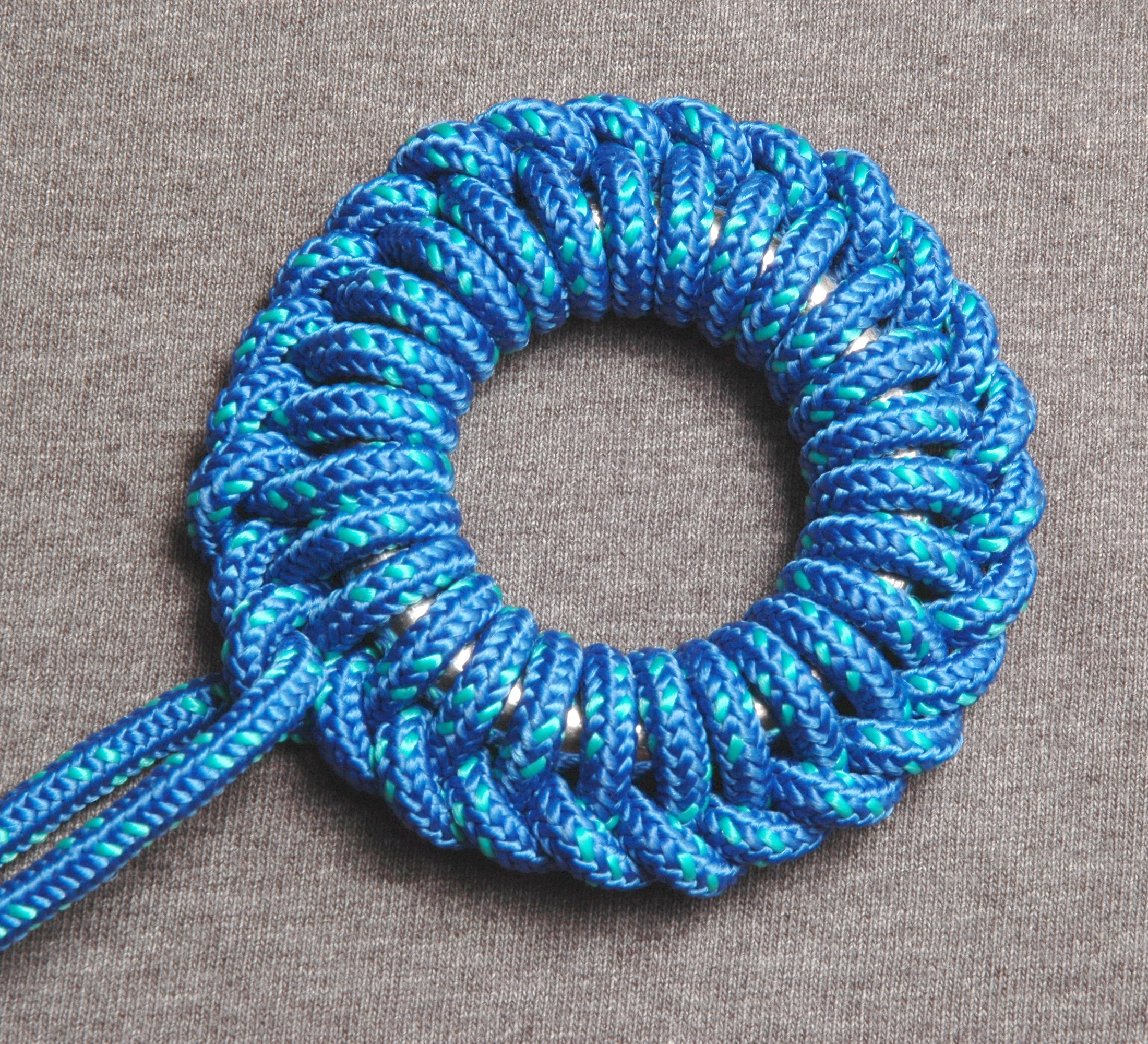
- Continuous ring hitching
- Names: Ringbolt hitching, Continuous ring hitching, Single ringbolt hitching, Kackling, Keckling, Hog backing
- Category: Hitch
- Typical use: To prevent damage from the ring
- ABoK: #3602, #3604, #3613

Ringbolt hitching is a series of hitches made around a ring. Covering a ring in hitching can prevent damage if the ring is likely to chafe or strike against something, such as a mooring line or mast.

== Continuous ==
Continuous ring hitching, also known as single ringbolt hitching, is a series of identical hitches made around a ring. This is considered the simplest form of ringbolt hitching.

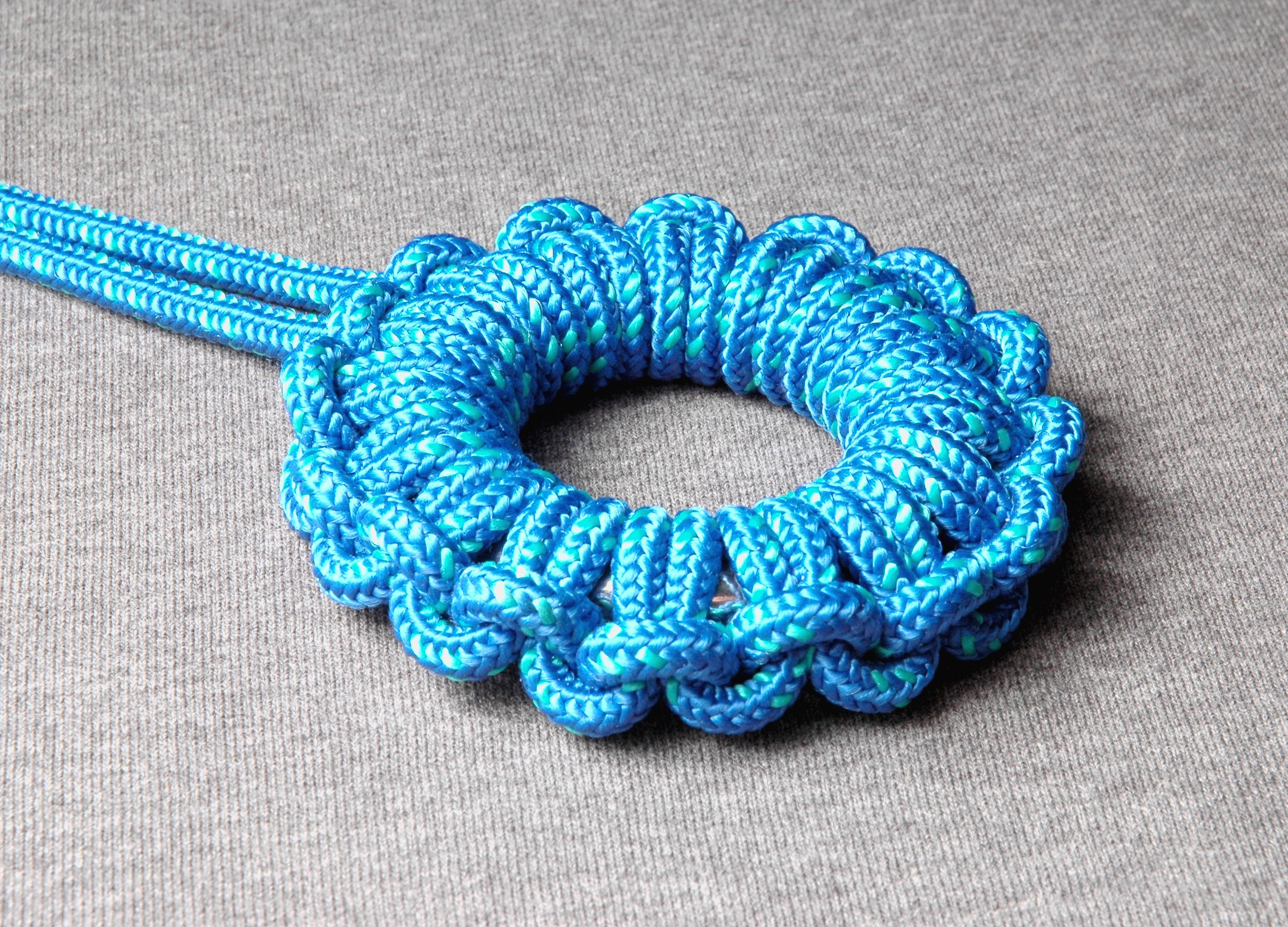
Alternate ring hitching (ABOK 3604)

== Alternate ==
Alternate ring hitching, also known as kackling or keckling, is a type of ringbolt hitching formed with a series of alternate left and right hitches made around a ring.

As a means of dampening sound in row boats when a covert night operation was being undertaken, oar handles were wrapped in keckling knots to prevent wood rubbing on wood.

== More Ringbolt hitches ==
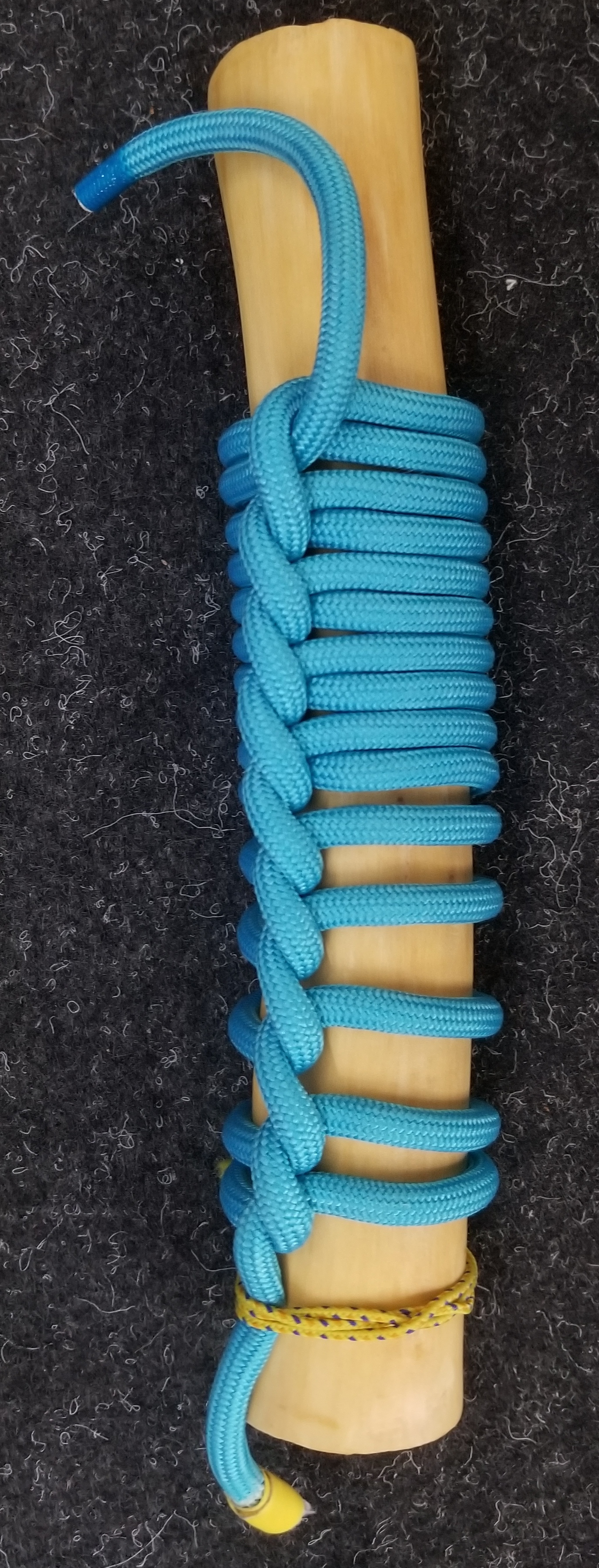
Clifford W. Ashley shows two versions of ABOK 3602. Below is without, above with additional turn.

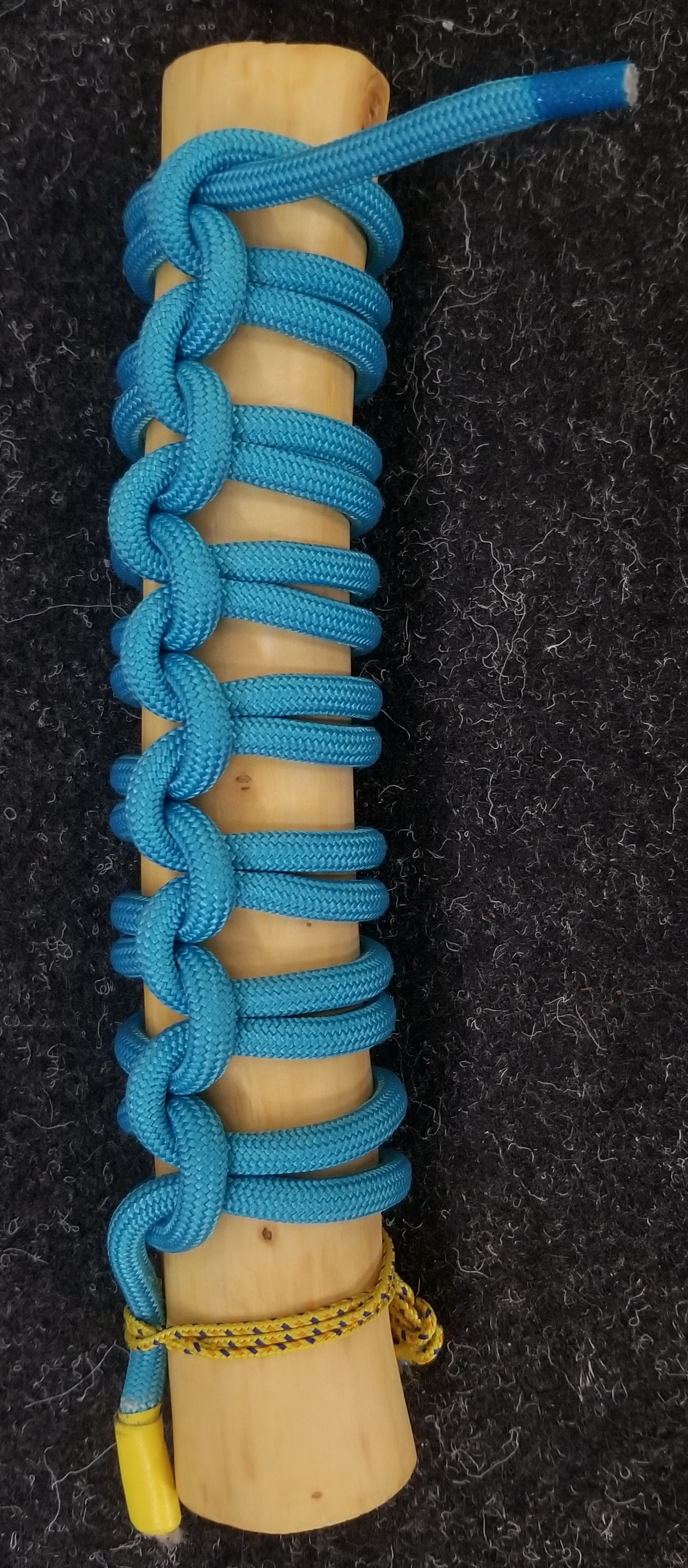
Single-Strand Ringbolt hitch (ABOK 3604). Alternating.

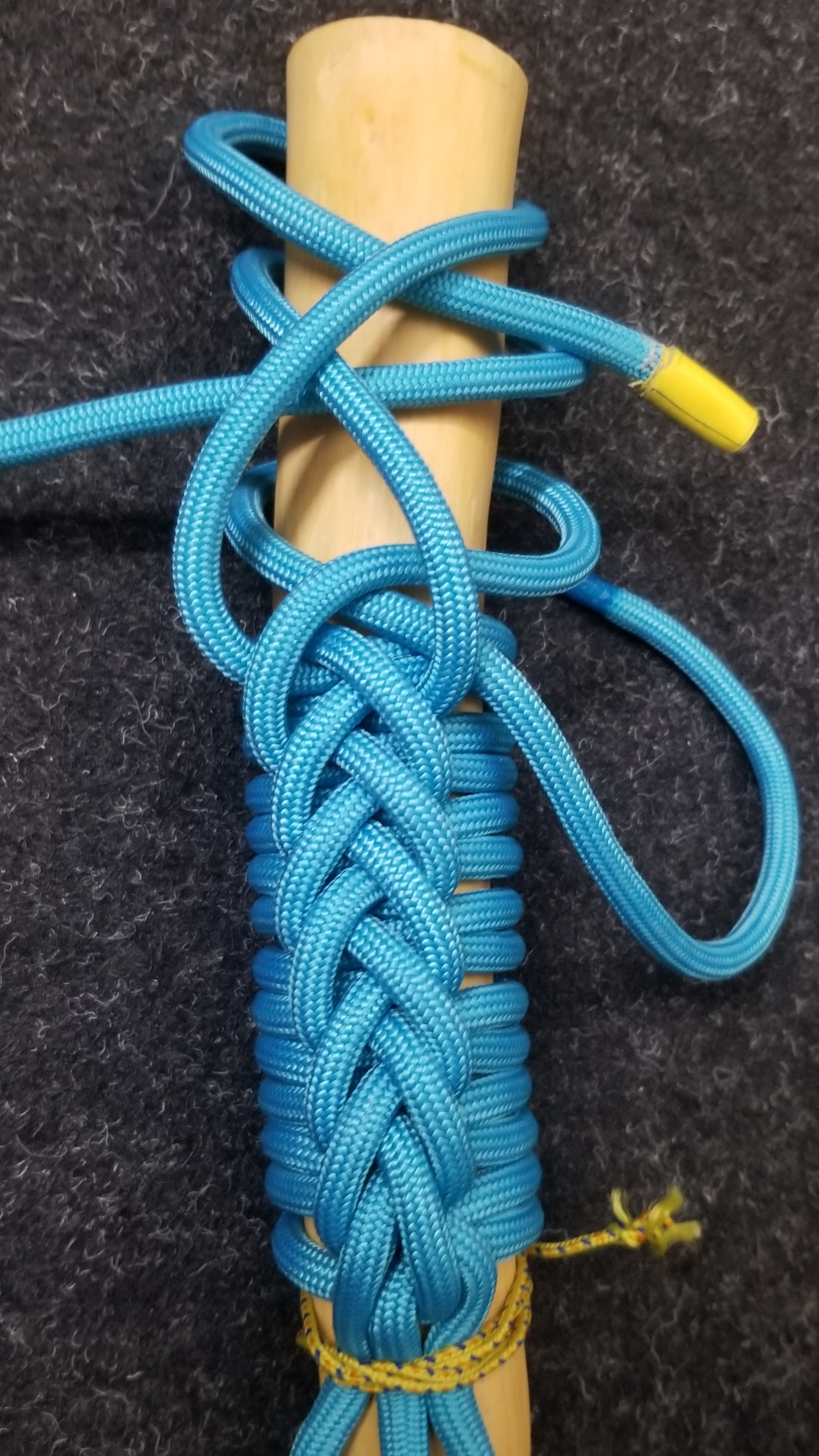
Three-strand Ringbolt hitch (ABOK 3605)

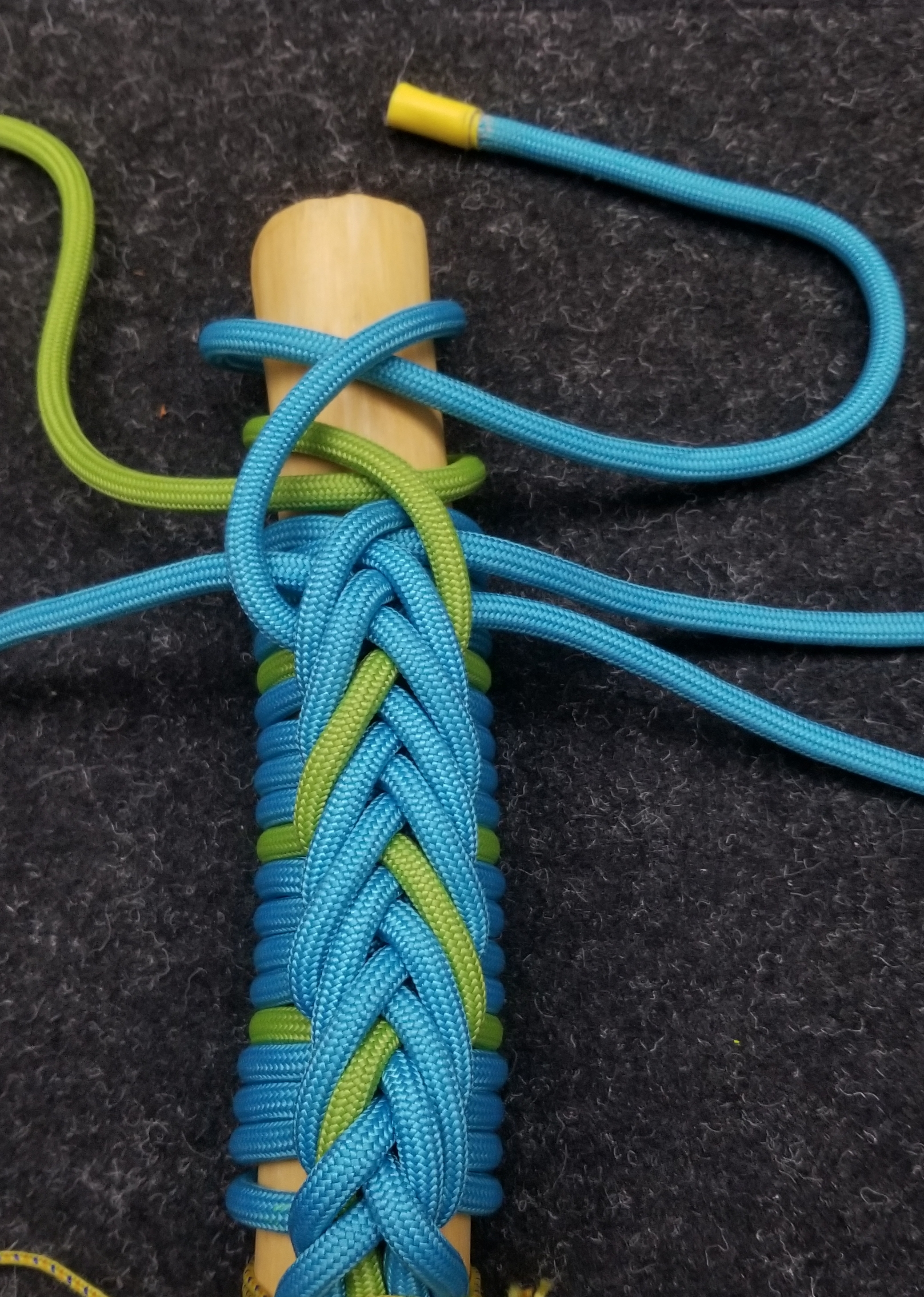
Five-strand Ringbolt hitch (ABOK 3606)

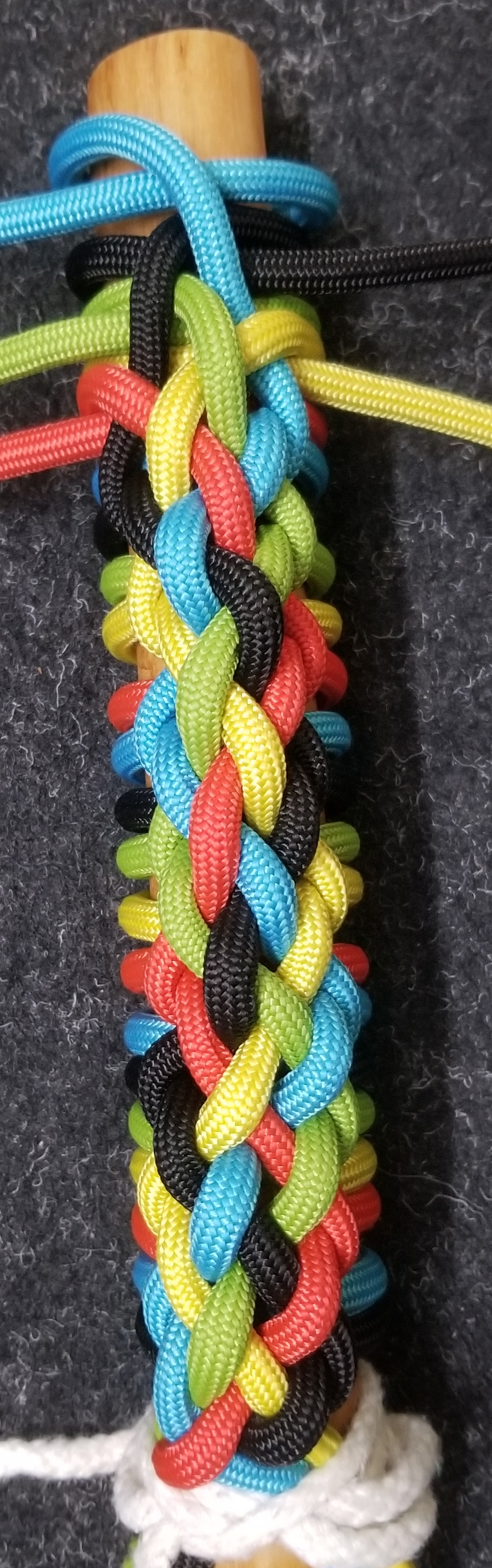
Five-strand Ringbolt hitch (ABOK 3607) in style of a French sinnet.

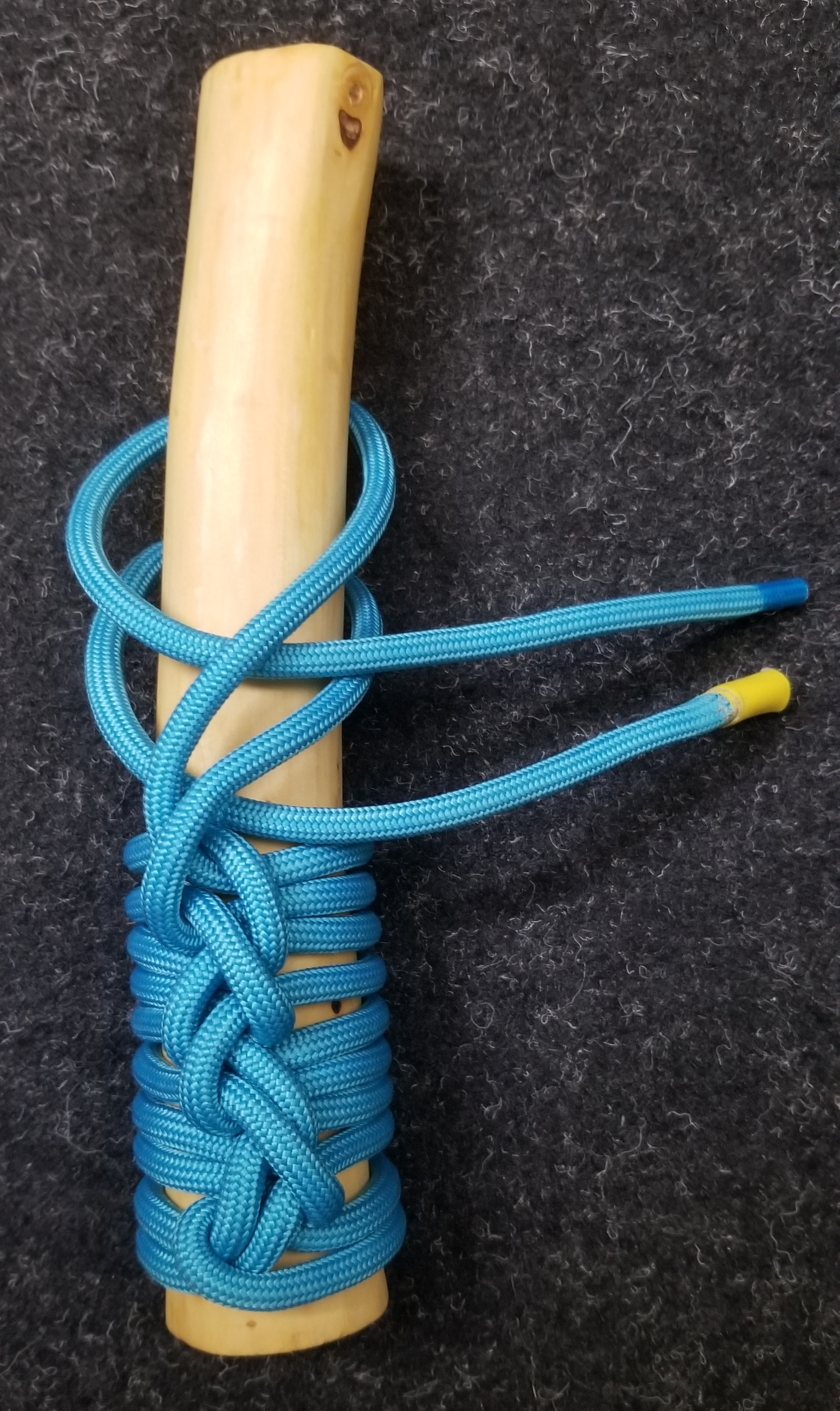
Two-strand Ringbolt hitch (ABOK 3608)

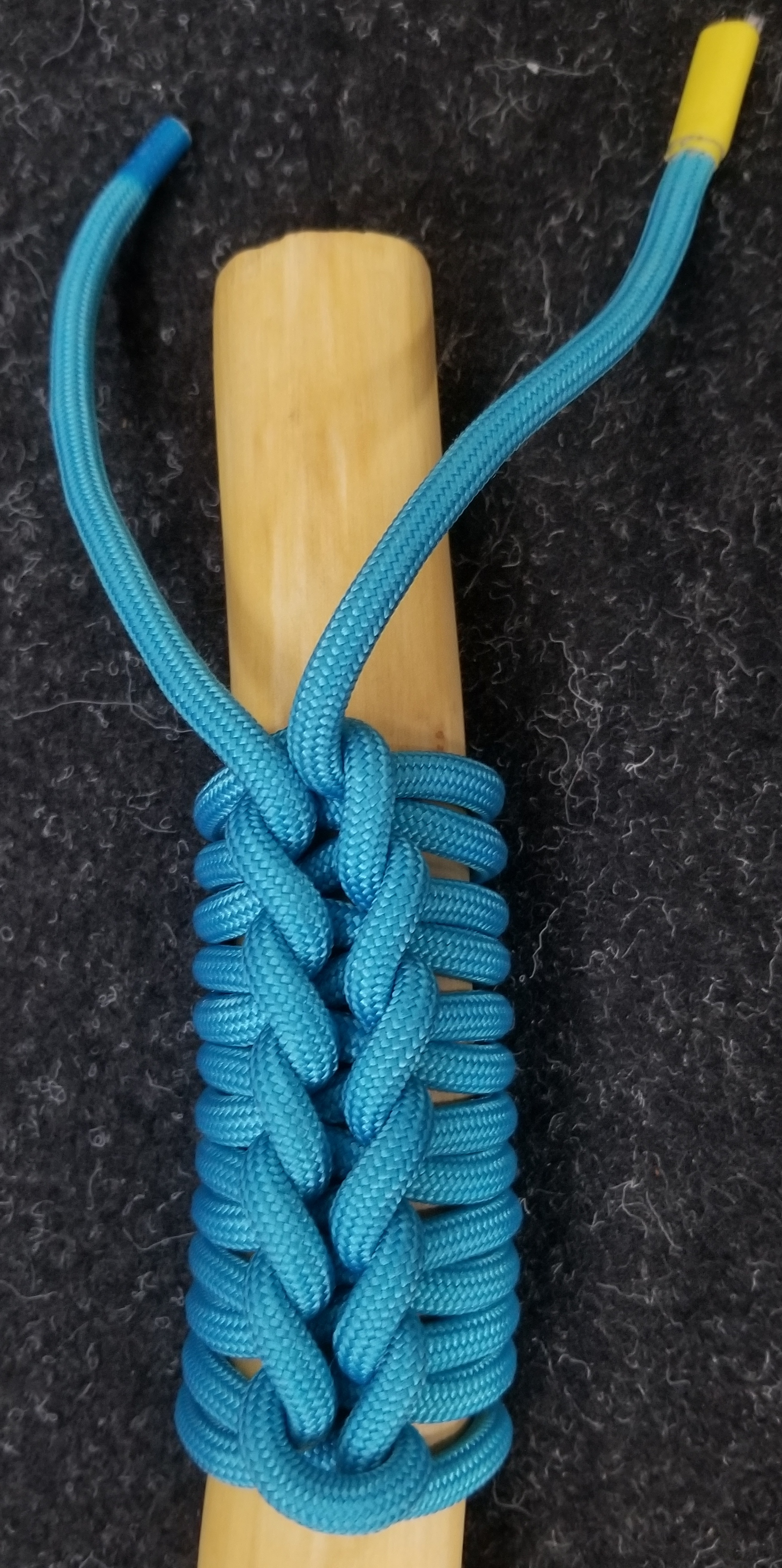
Two-strand Ringbolt hitch (ABOK 3609)

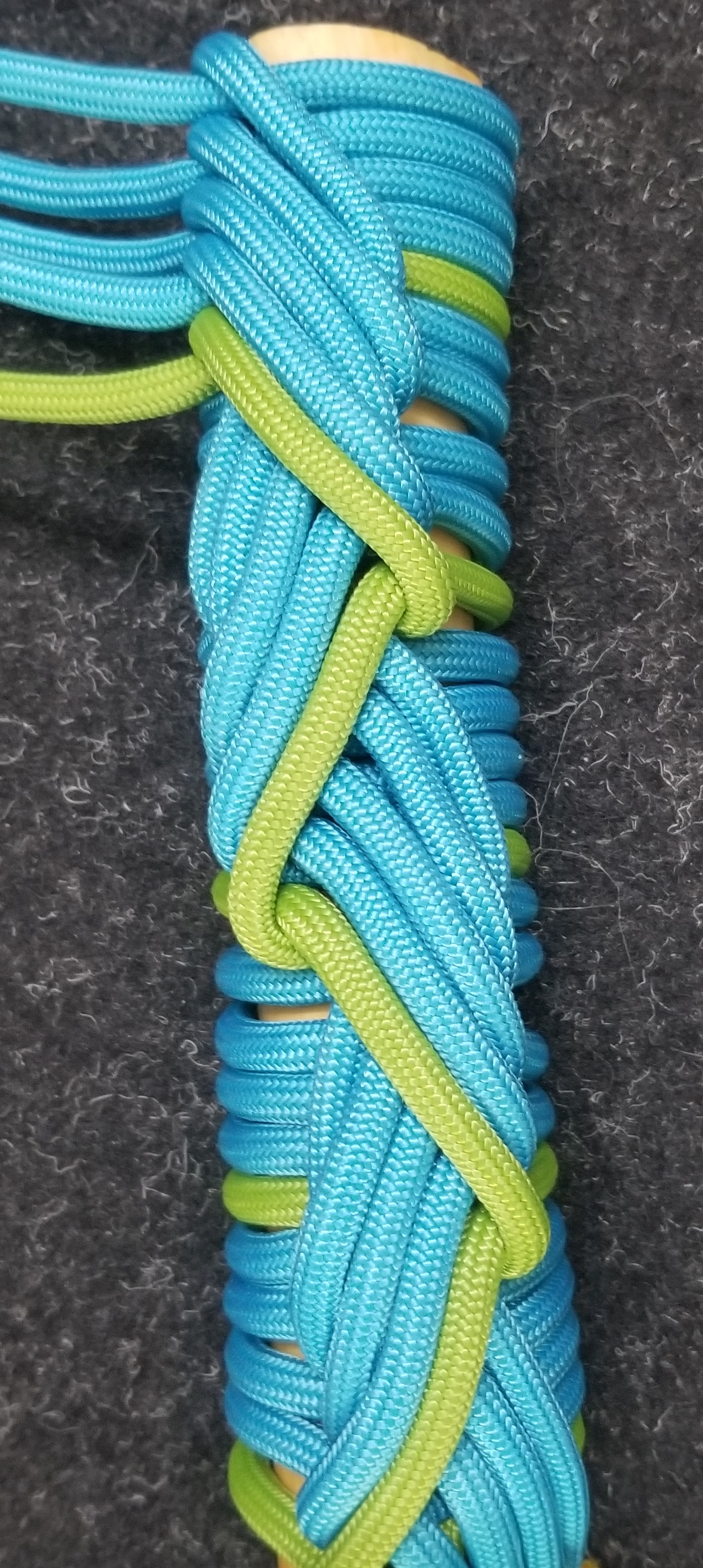
Five-strand Zigzag Ringbolt hitch (ABOK 3610)

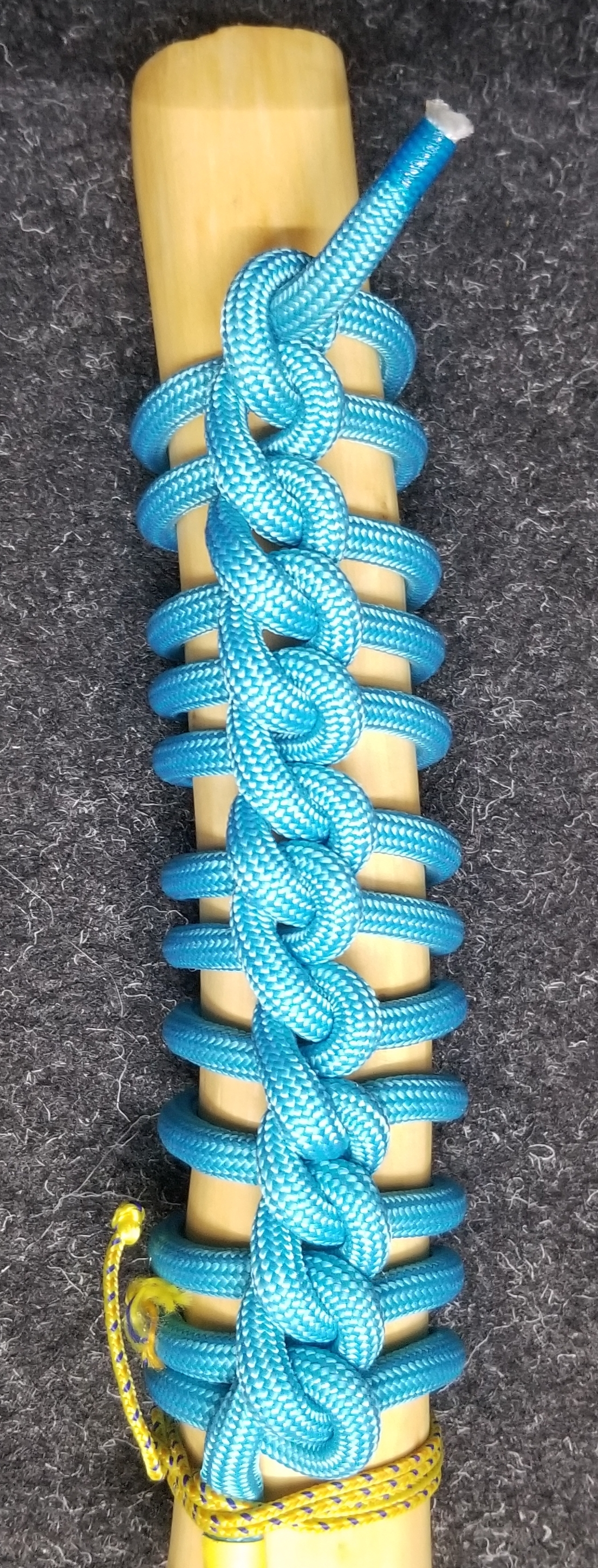
Single-Strand Ringbolt hitch (ABOK 3611). Buttonholing-style

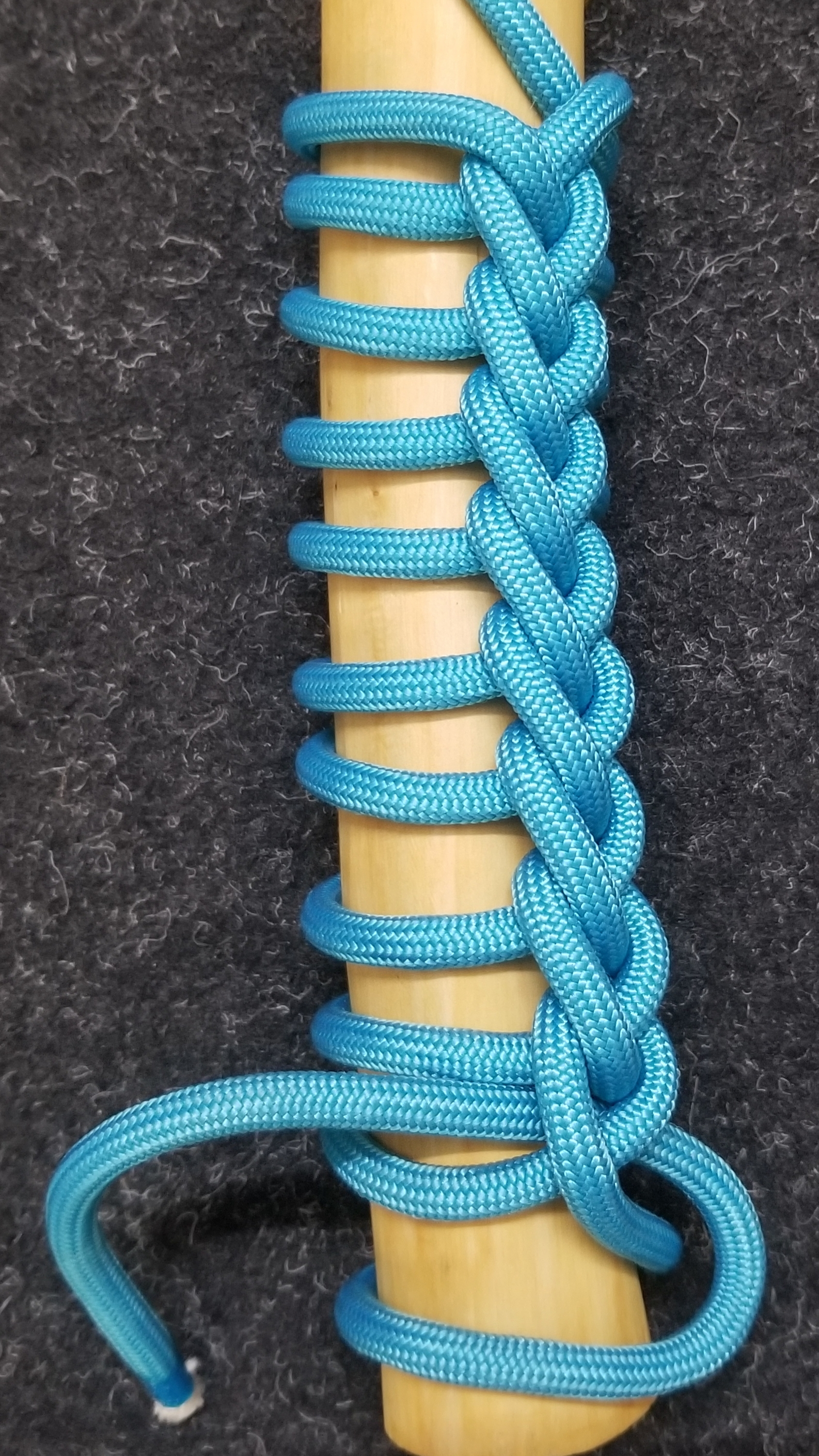
Single-Strand Ringbolt hitch (ABOK 3612). Buttonholing-style

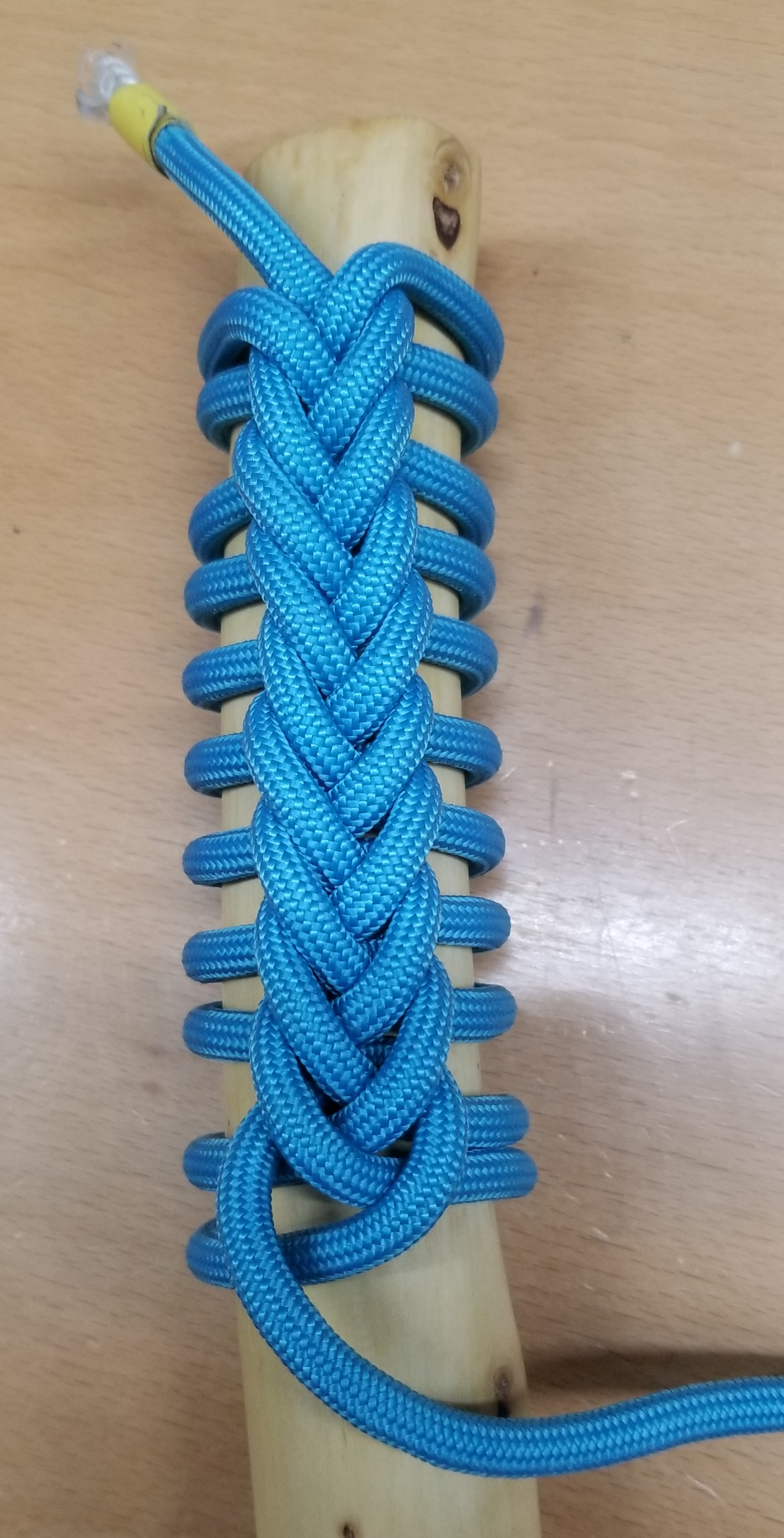
Single-Strand Ringbolt hitch (ABOK 3613)

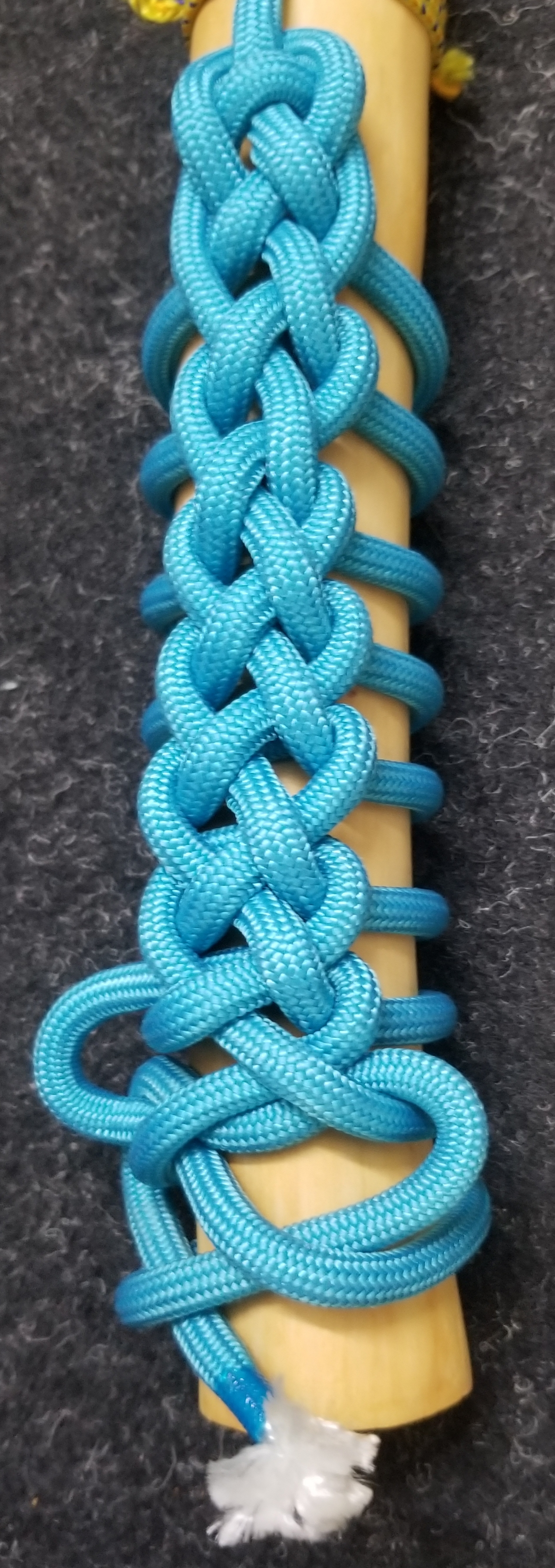
Single-Strand Ringbolt hitch (ABOK 3614)

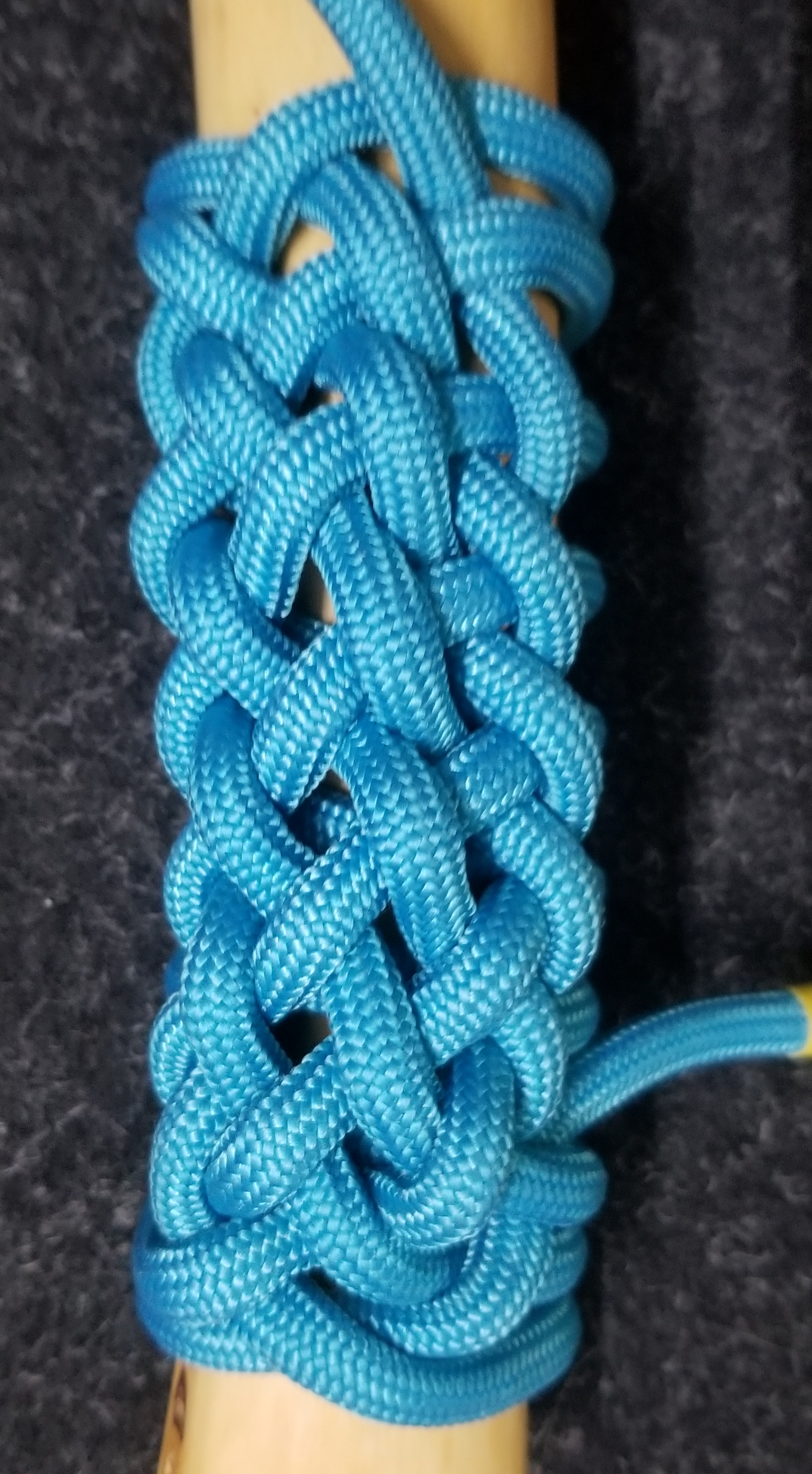
Single-Strand Ringbolt hitch (ABOK 3615)

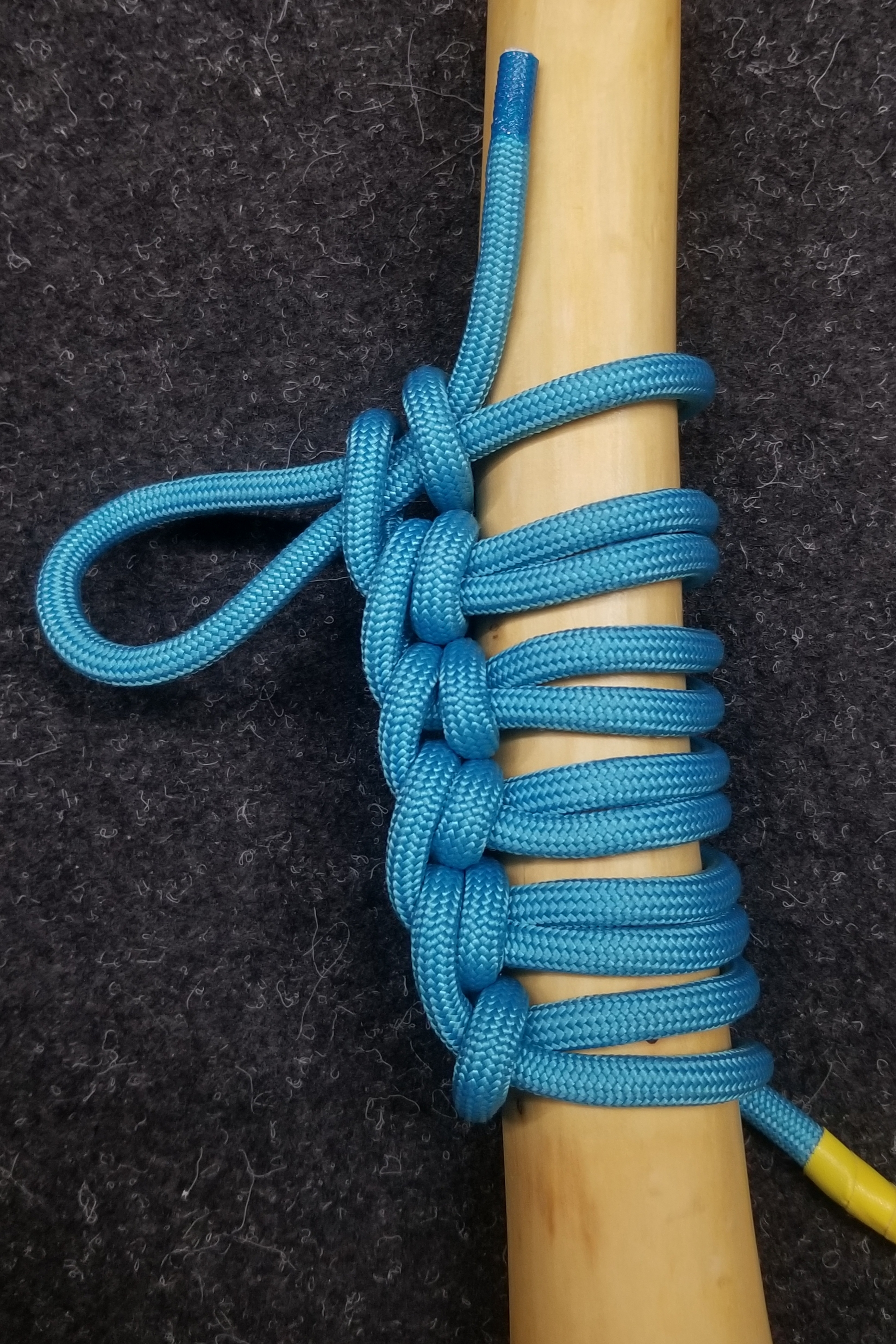
Single-Strand Ringbolt hitch (ABOK 3616)

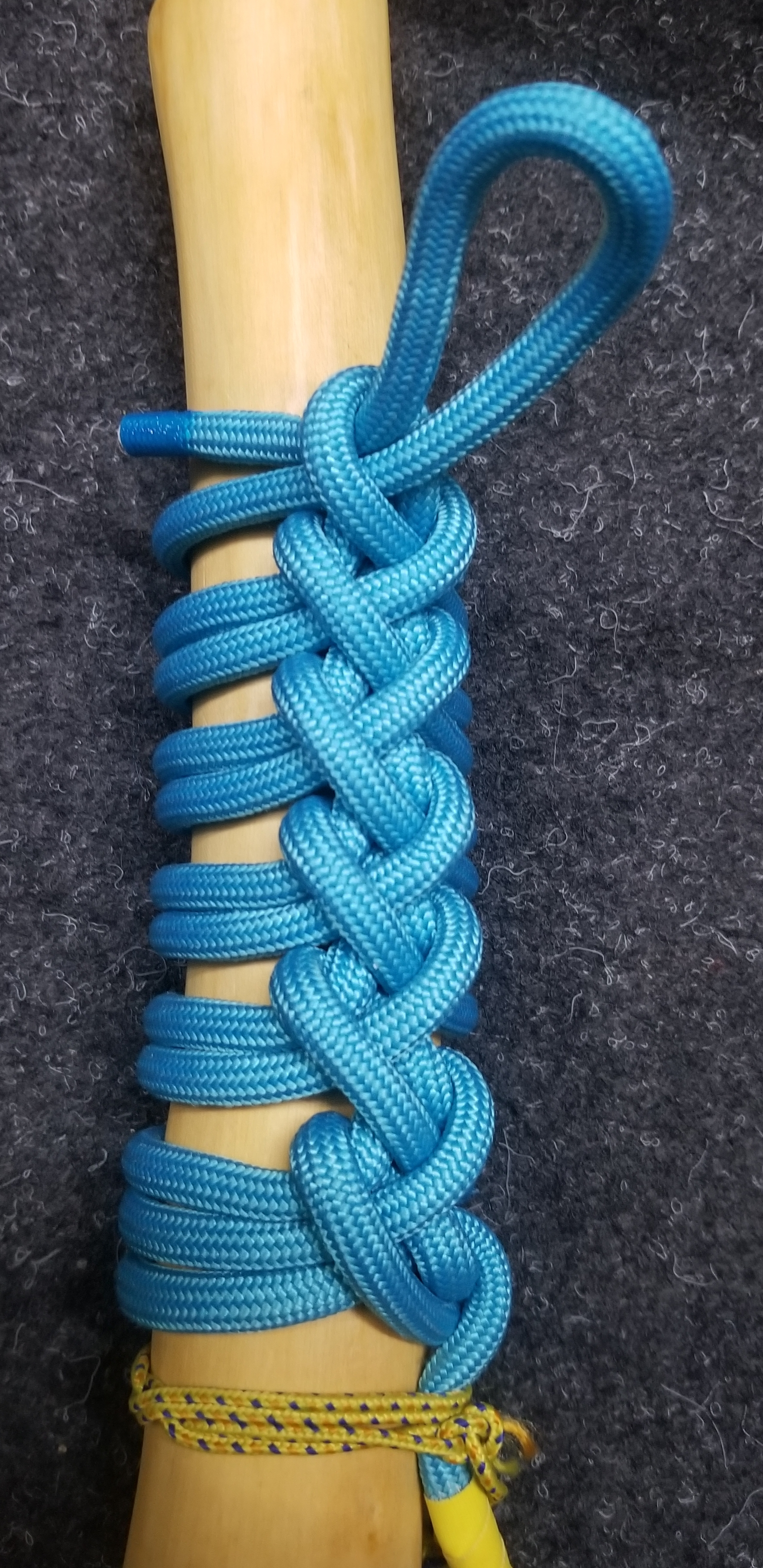
Single-Strand Ringbolt hitch (ABOK 3617)

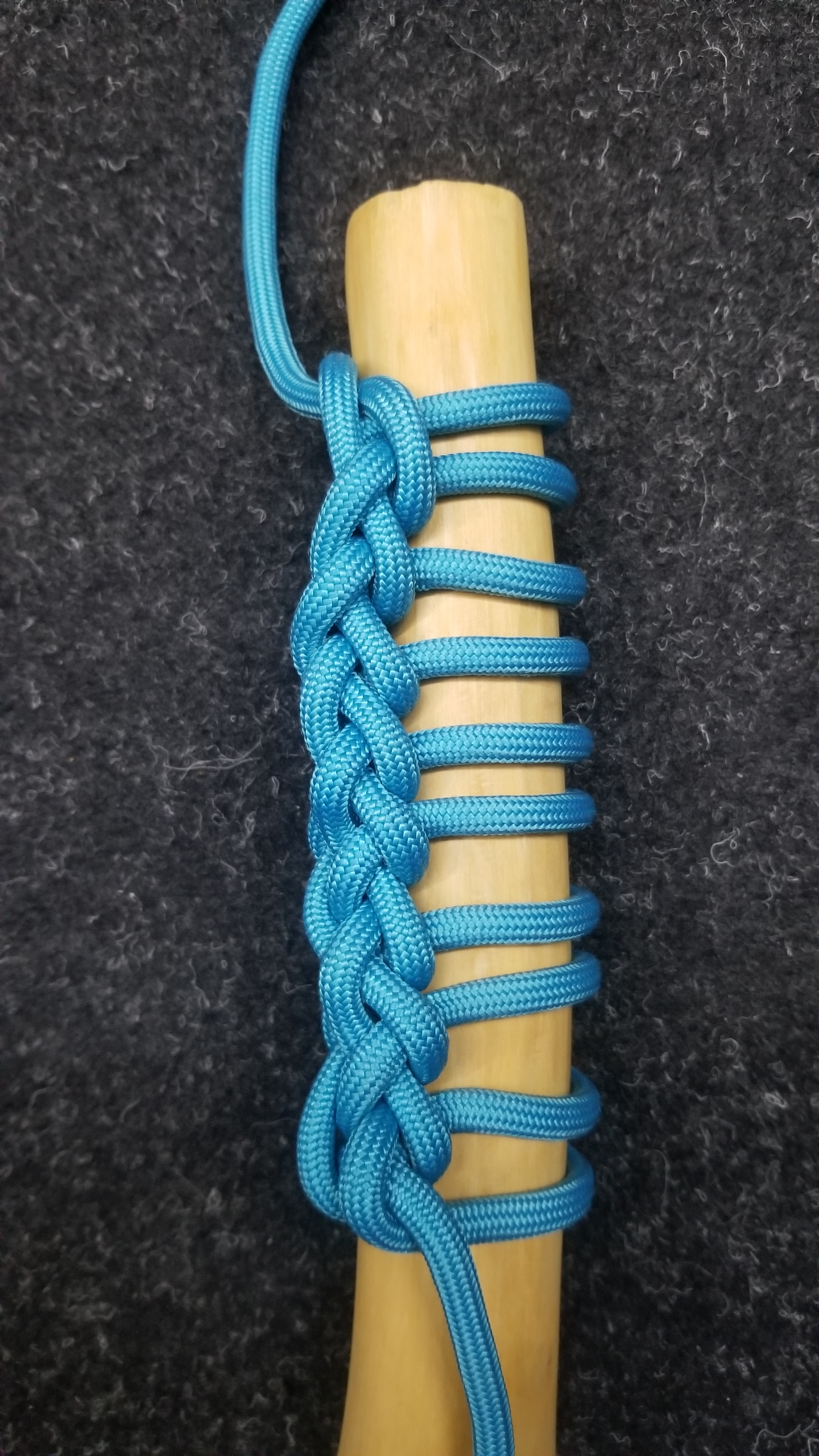
Single-Strand Ringbolt hitch (ABOK 3618)

== See also ==
- Chirality (mathematics)
- List of knots
- List of hitch knots
