= Axle hitch =

Knot

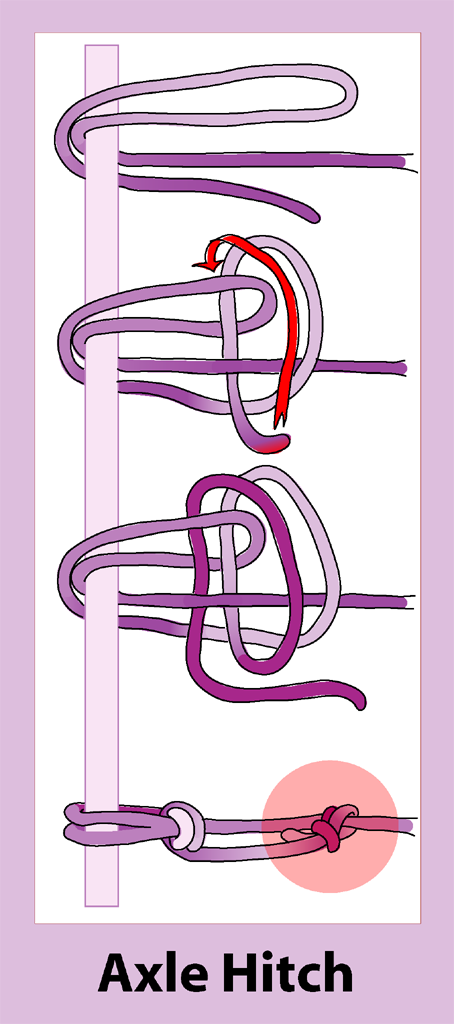
- Category: Hitch
- Related: Bowline
- Typical use: attaching a line to a relatively inaccessible object, such as a vehicle axle
- ABoK: #162, #1850

The axle hitch is used to tie a hitch in a hard-to-reach place, or for extra security by having a double hold on an object. When the initial bight is passed around the object, the rest of the knot can be completed out away from the cramped location. The knot is finished with a bowline knot or other reliable knot that connects the working end to the standing part.

It provides distributed strength and is useful when a shock load needs to be spread along an anchor point, since it provides four lines distributed across two points, in which case a double bowline or water bowline should be used as the security knot.

== See also ==
- List of knots
