= Carrick bend loop =

Knot

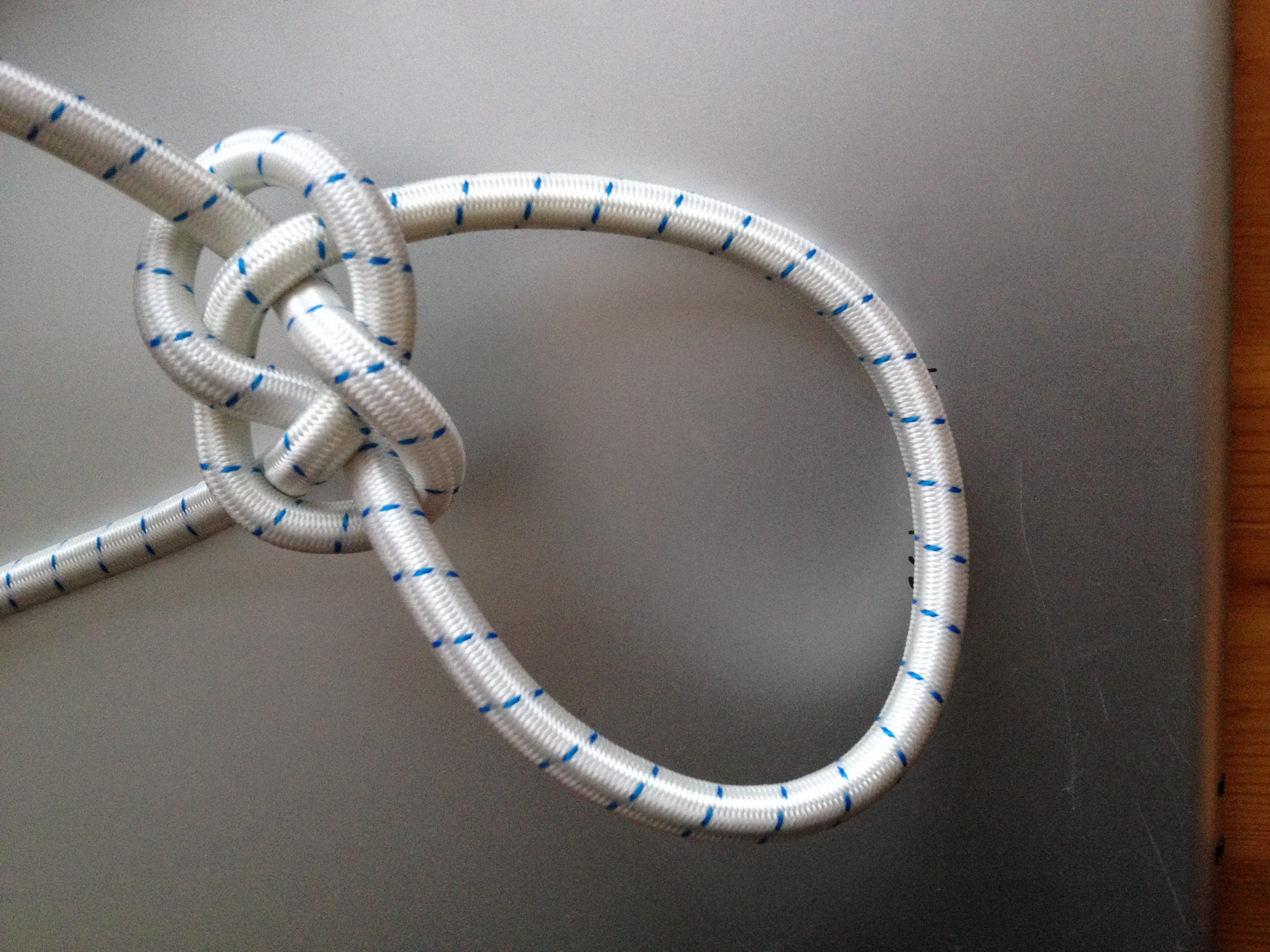
- Names: Carrick bend loop, bollard loop
- ABoK: #1033

A carrick loop is a knot used to make a reliable and stable loop at the end of a rope formed by the tail turned around and attached to the main part using a carrick bend.

== Tying ==
The carrick bend knot closing the carrick bend loop will consist of

- a simple closed loop of the main part and
- a small closed loop of the rope tail
- woven together in a basket weave pattern and then
- tightened.

The knot will have 8 crossing points, 7 holes, the central hole with 4 straight edges, and the 6 others with 2 straight and one external curved edge. The main part, the end, and the two loop edges will enter the knot from the four corners of the knot when tied flat; If the ones that will carry the heaviest loads are placed at opposite corners the knot will hold better.

The carrick loop is reliable, and easy to untie, but there are no advantages over other loops that are easier to tie.

== Variations ==
There are two possible variations depending on the loop ends angle of entry to the knot relative to each other, roughly 90 degrees, or 180 degrees; The former giving a more flat and decorative knot and the latter, double coin knot, being more secure.

== See also ==
- List of knots
