= Bumper knot =

Type of fishing knot

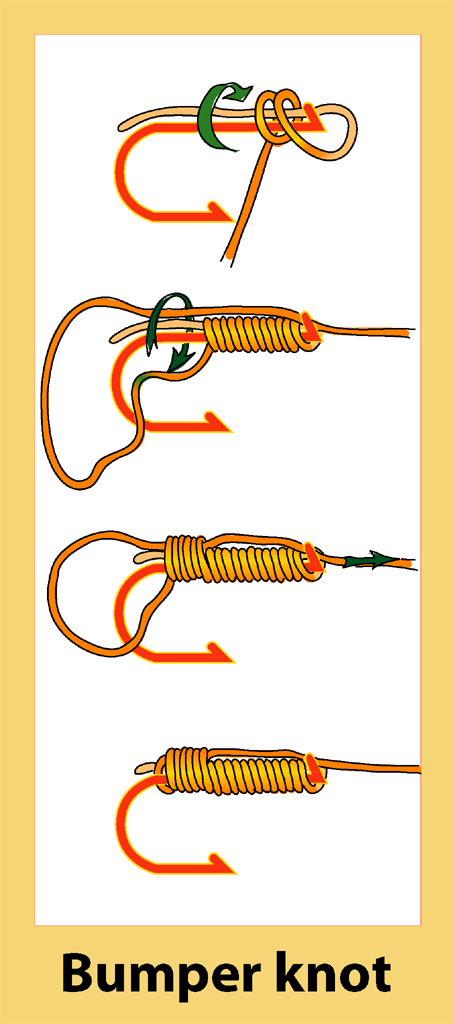
- Names: Bumper knot, Bait loop, Egg loop
- Category: Loop
- Releasing: Non-jamming
- Typical use: fishing

In fishing, a bumper knot (also known as a bait loop or egg loop) can be used to secure soft or loose bait, including clusters of eggs, to a hook.

== Instructions ==
The first suggestion for tying the bumper knot is to always keep the loops tight. If the loops become loose at all the knot will not work. The initial string used for the lead usually consumes about 8 inches when tying. To start tying the knot, hold the bend of the hook, and start feeding one end of the line through the eye of the hook. Do this until it is possible to grasp it with the same fingers holding the hook. After that, start to wrap the line around the shank of the hook in a clockwise direction. It is known that the first loop is also the toughest to make. Altogether, about 18-20 loops will be adequate. It needs to be tight and there needs to be a lot of pressure on the line. Then place the opposite end of the leader in a parallel direction to the shank of the hook and put it through the eye. All this needs to be done so that the previous loops do not come undone. Wrap over the line that is put through the eye, and make these wraps clockwise. On this set, it is recommended to only wrap with medium pressure. For about four or five wraps, continue to work with this process and make sure that they do not overlap. Then grasp all of the wraps on the hook to hold them tightly. Then pull the line hanging out of the eye and pull it through the wraps. The final step is to make everything snug and in place.

== See also ==
- List of knots
