= Hitching tie =

Type of knot

A diagram of how to tie the hitching tie knot

The hitching tie is a simple knot used to tie off stuff sacks that allows quick access as it unties quickly. To untie the knot, just pull hard on the free end of the rope and the knot will fall open. This is simply a noose or slip knot, with the loop tightened around an object. This is not a very strong knot for climbing or other extreme activities.

== Related knots ==
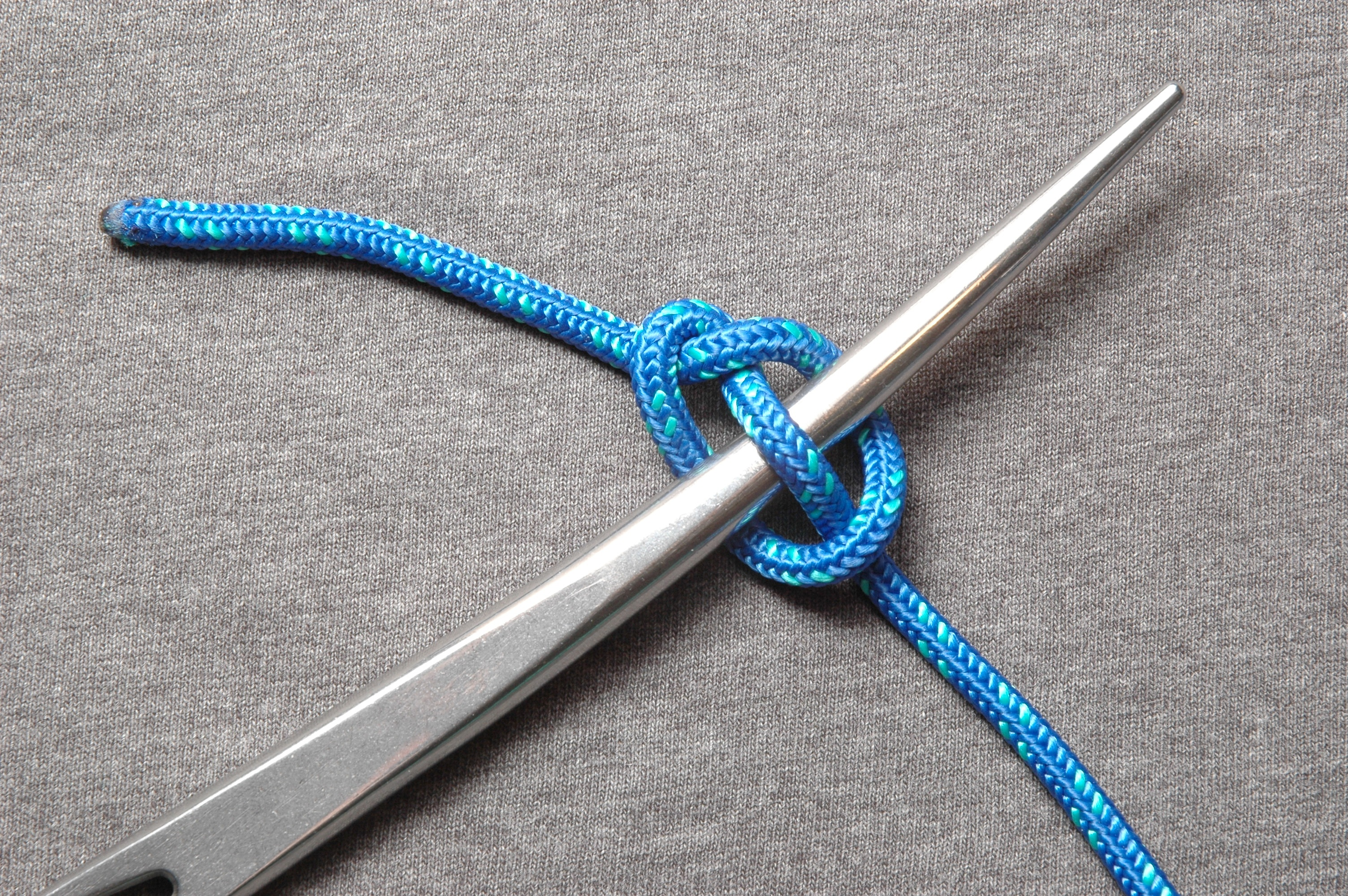
Marlinespike hitch

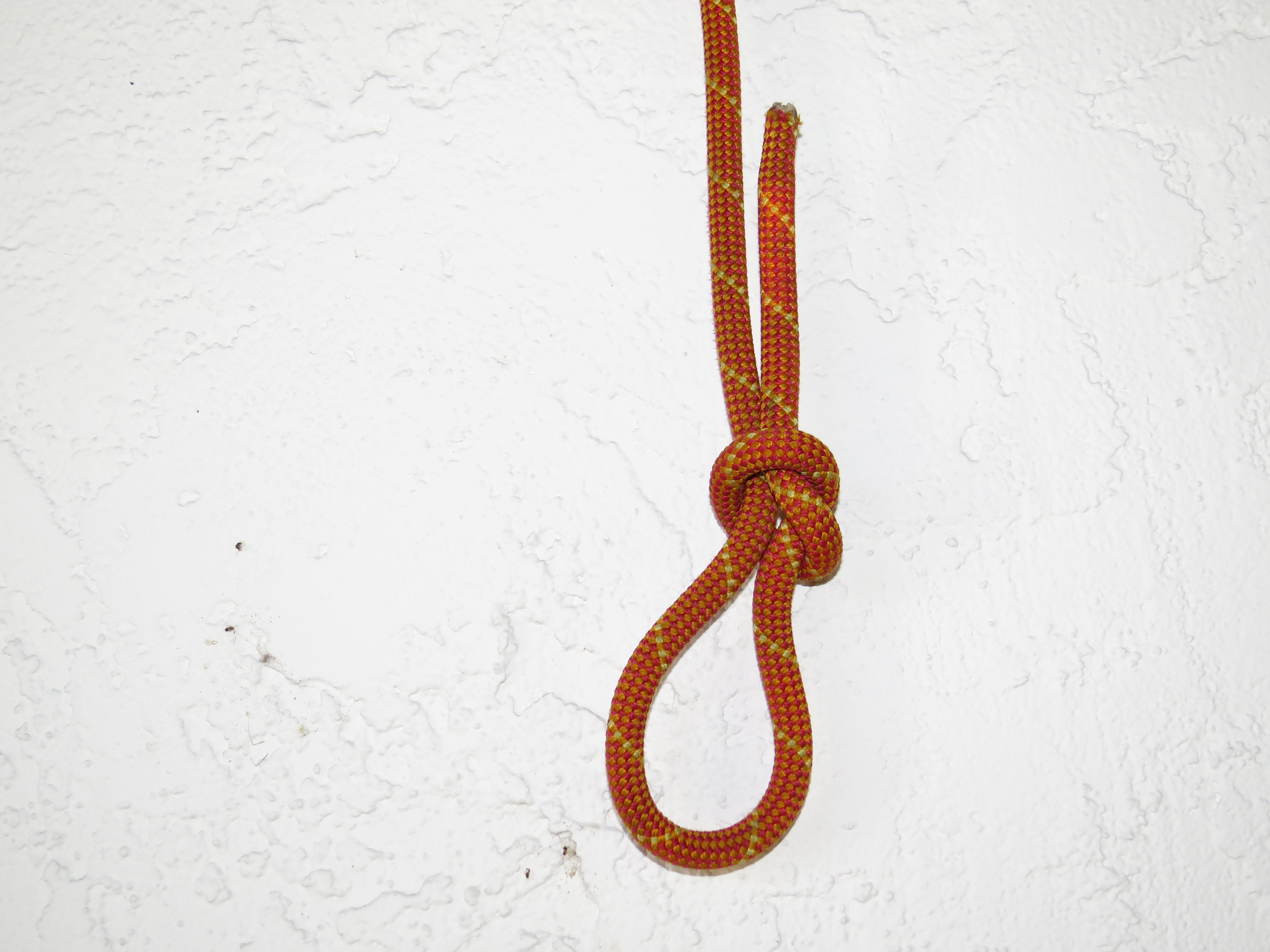
Noose

== See also ==
- List of knots
