= Double figure-eight loop =

Type of knot

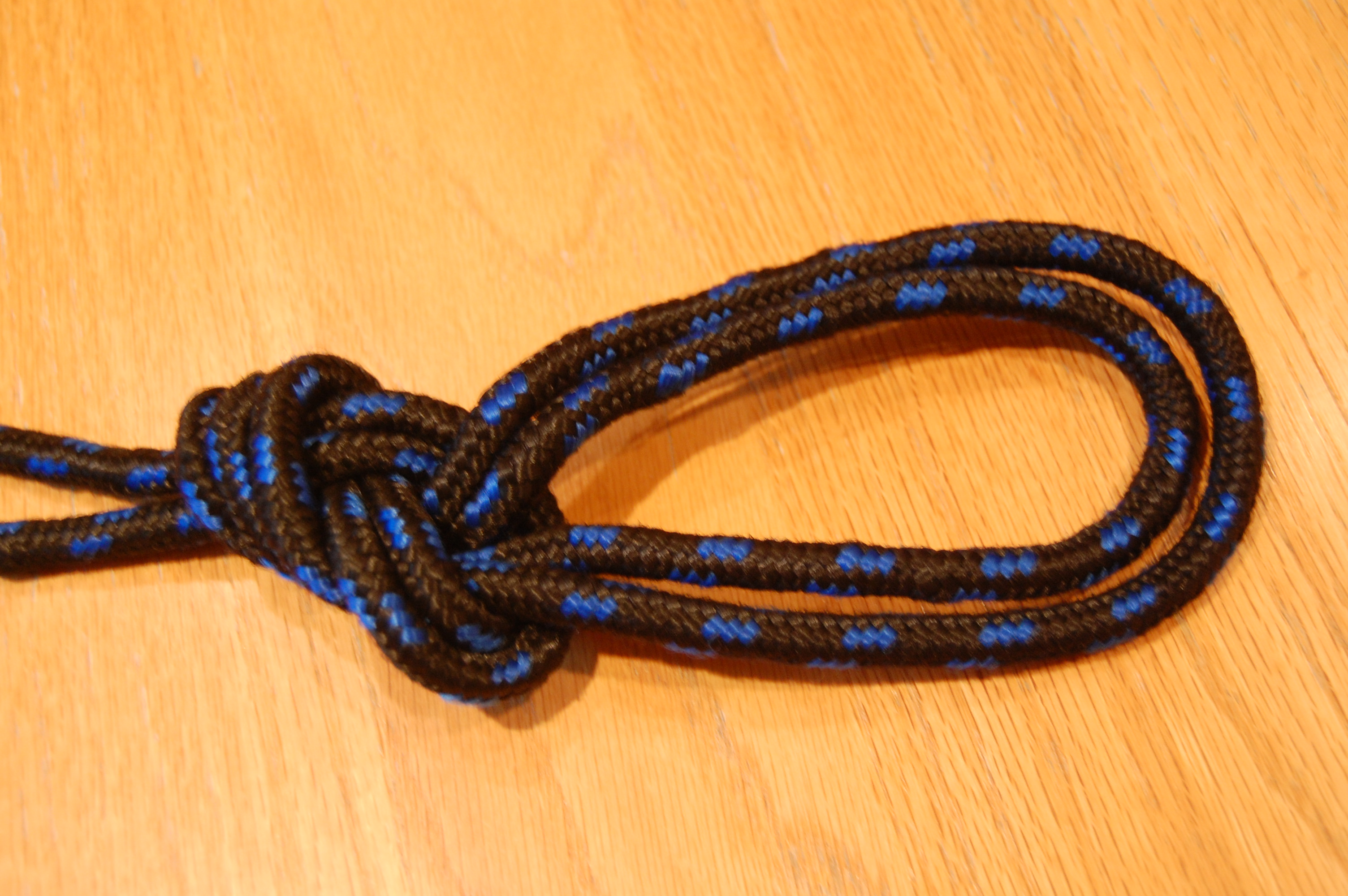
- Names: Double figure-eight loop, double Flemish loop, bunny ears
- Category: Loop
- Related: Figure-eight loop
- Typical use: climbing, equalizing anchors
- ABoK: #1085

A double figure-eight loop, (also known as a bunny ears, or a dog eared loop) is a type of knot that forms two parallel loops, and resembles the figure-eight loop.

It is frequently used in climbing and caving as an easily untie-able knot that is capable of being attached to two bolts and equalised.

A variation of this knot exists, known as the double figure-eight follow through that creates another loop below the bulk of the knot, a feature that is useful for clipping safety ropes into.
