= Versatackle knot =

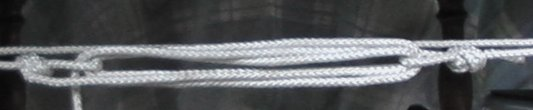

A versatackle is a self-locking tensioning structure implemented in cordage. It consists of two loops with the rope passed back and forth between them. It is functionally similar to the trucker's hitch; however, unlike the trucker's hitch, the versatackle is self-locking under tension.

The pressure, friction, and heat that may be generated by the running end moving through the loops can accelerate wear at the loops.

== Step-by-step images ==
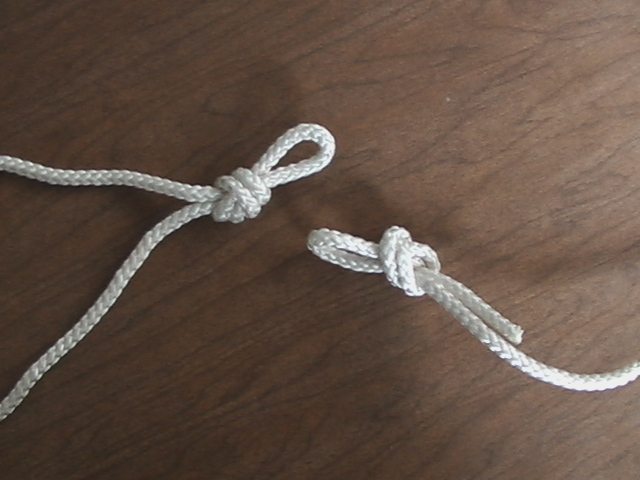
Make a loop knot on one end of the rope and another loop knot in the middle, just shorter than the area to be bound. (An overhand loop knot can be used here, but a Butterfly Knot works better because it doesn't jam when strained and it's easy to untie.)

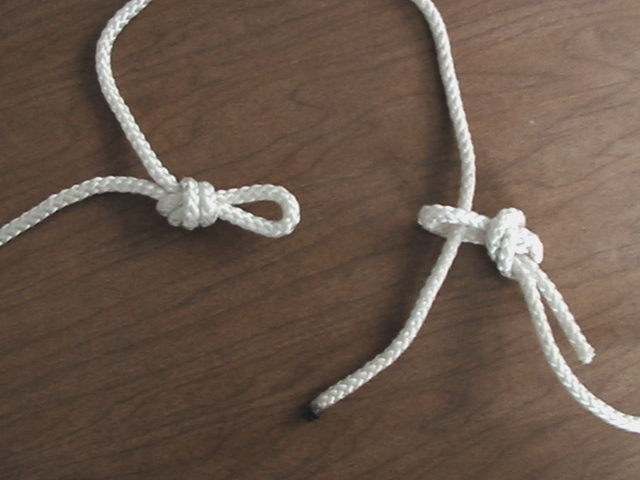
Pass the second working end through the loop knot in the first working end.

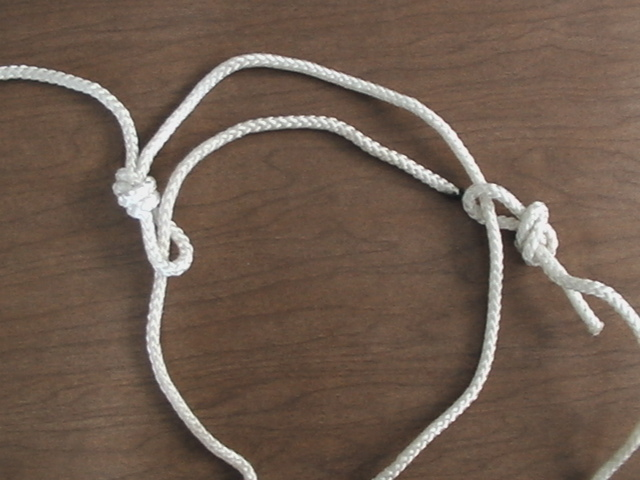
Bring the second working end up through the loop knot tied in the middle of the rope.

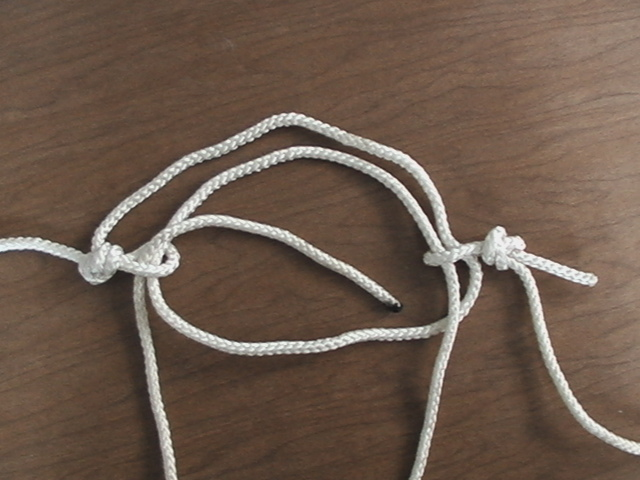
Repeat until there are two or three complete passes (two or three ropes in each loop).

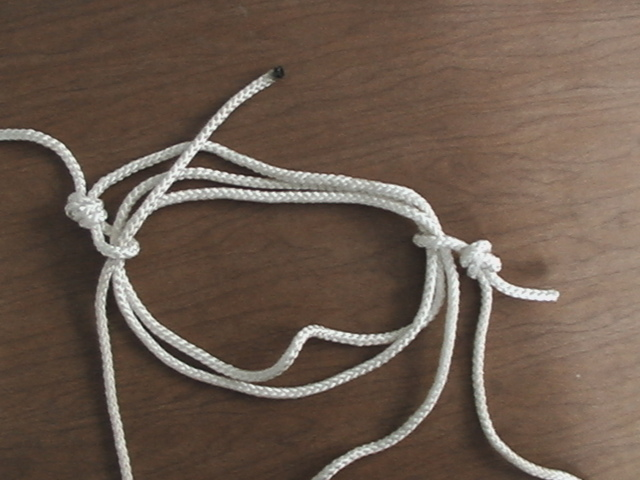
Pull on the second working end, and work out the slack to tighten.

== See also ==
- List of knots
