= Magnus hitch =

- Names: Magnus hitch, Adjustable hitch
- Category: Hitch
- Related: Taut-line hitch, Rolling hitch, Two half-hitches, Trucker's hitch, Adjustable grip hitch
- ABoK: #1736, #1857

The magnus hitch is a knot similar to a rolling hitch or clove hitch, used to tie a rope or line to a pole, spar, or another line. It is tied similarly to a rolling hitch but with the final hitch in the opposite direction. It can be more tricky to snug up, since both lines emerge from the same side of the hitch, but it has less tendency to twist under load.

== Tying ==
To tie a magnus hitch:

1. Start with a turn around the object. Bring the working end towards the direction of pull and between the standing part and the object.
2. Make another wrap around the object, completing a round turn. The wraps of the round turn should progress towards the desired direction of pull. Bring the working end out over the standing part away from the direction of pull.
3. Complete with a half hitch, moving around the object in the opposite direction as the first turns, as for a cow hitch.
4. Dress by snugging the hitch around the object before applying load, away from the tail of the hitch.

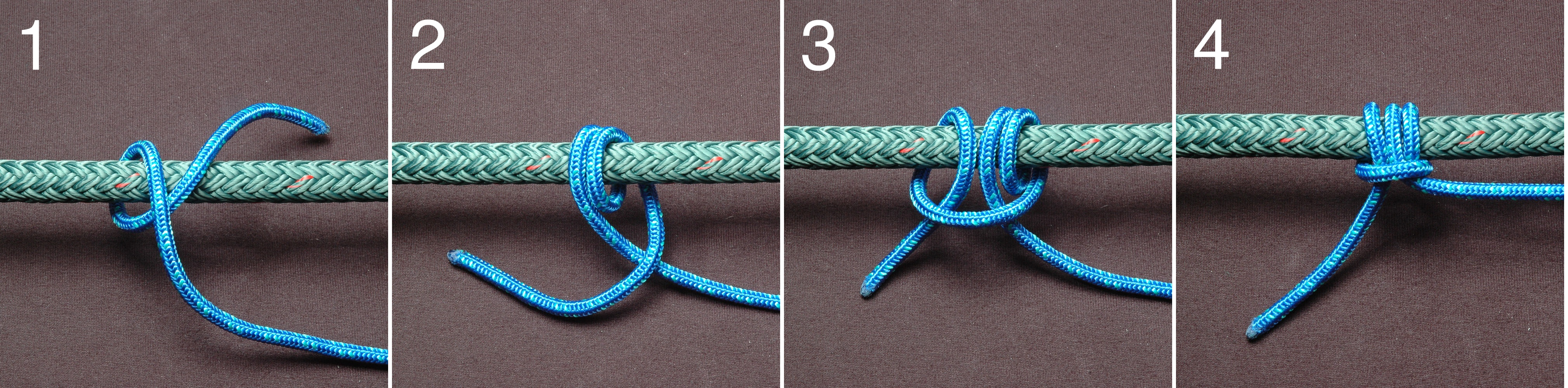

== See also ==
- List of knots
- Taut-line hitch
