= Overhand knot with draw-loop =

Type of knot

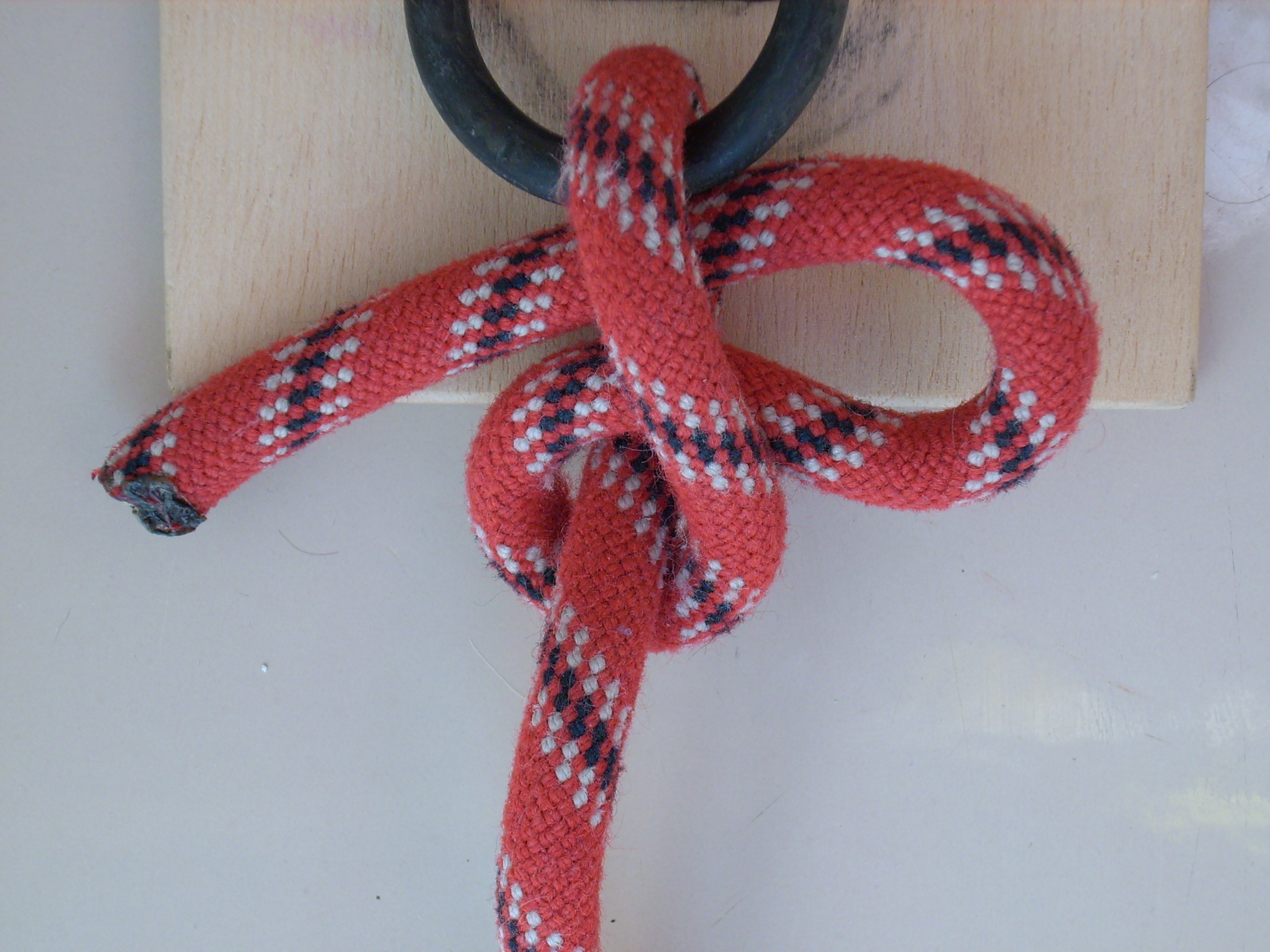
- Category: Hitch
- ABoK: 52

A slipped half hitch is a knot in which the weight of the load the rope carries depresses the loop sufficiently to keep it in place until the load item is placed in its location. When no longer required the free end may be pulled and draw the loop through and so release the load.

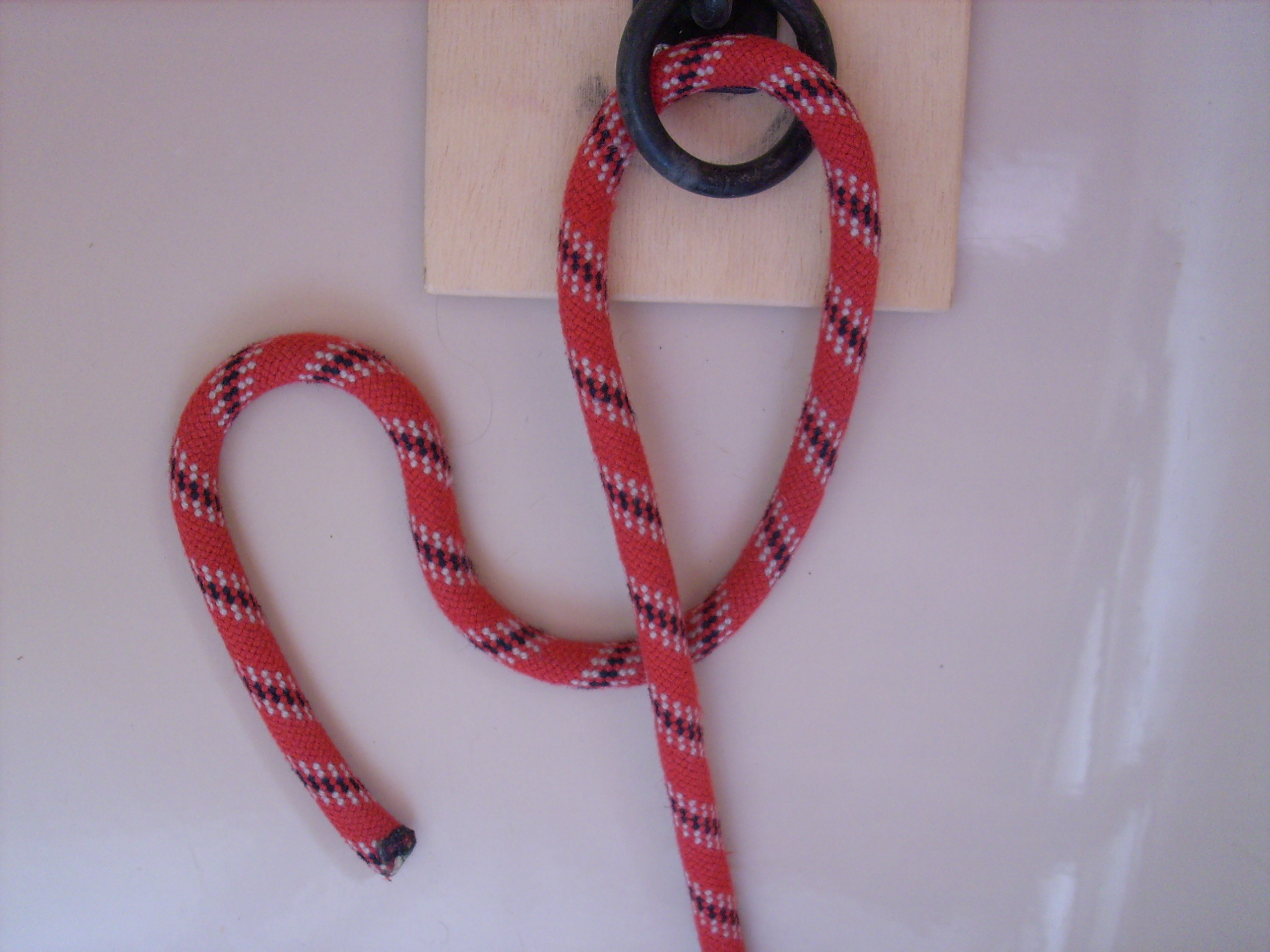
Tying onto a ring.

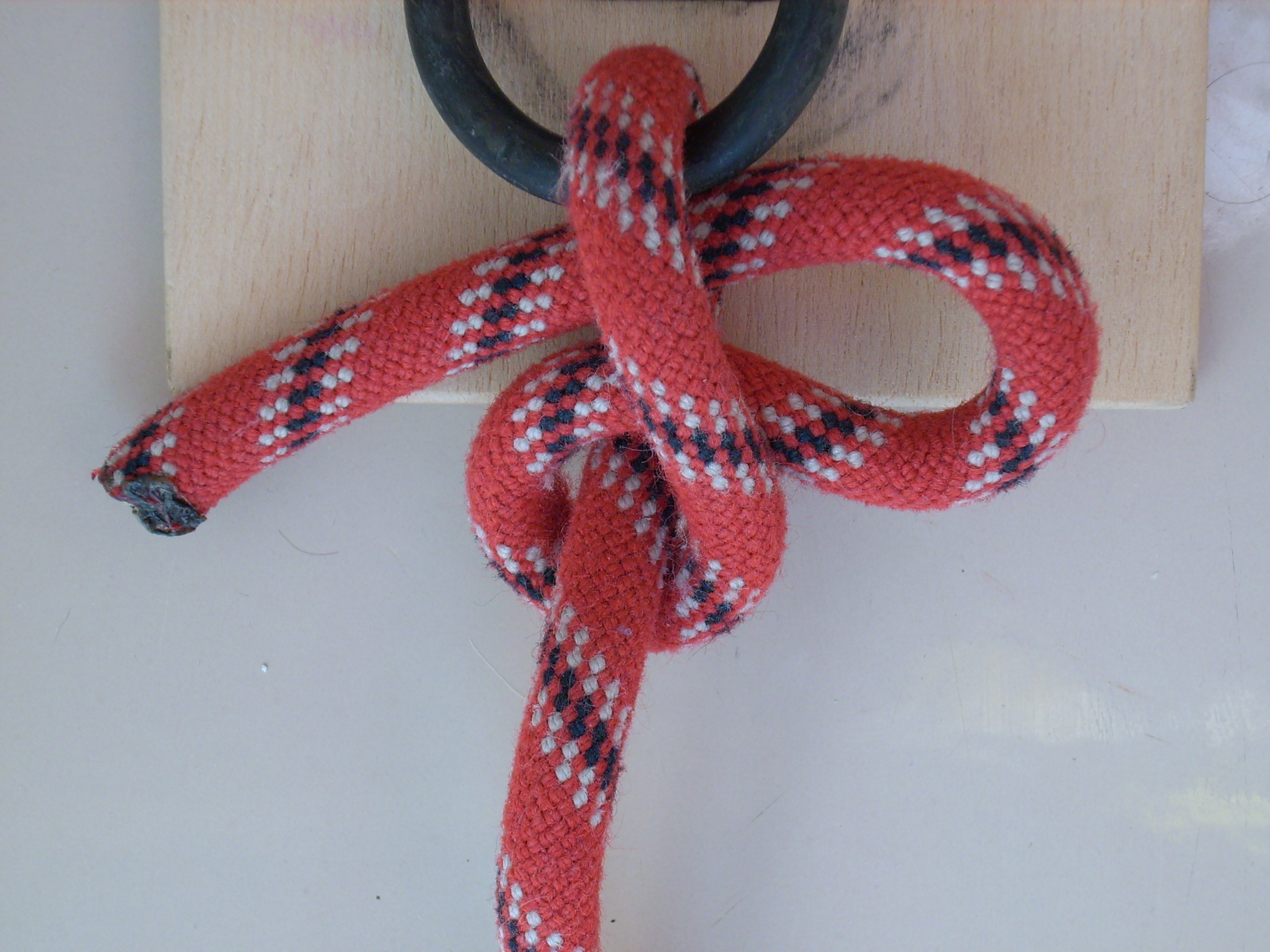

The Overhand Noose is sometimes used as a Slip Knot to form the loops of a Trucker's Hitch, or as a Stopper. Double Noose is used in arboriculture to fix a rope to a carabiner. Today this knot is mistakenly named like Barrel Hitch.

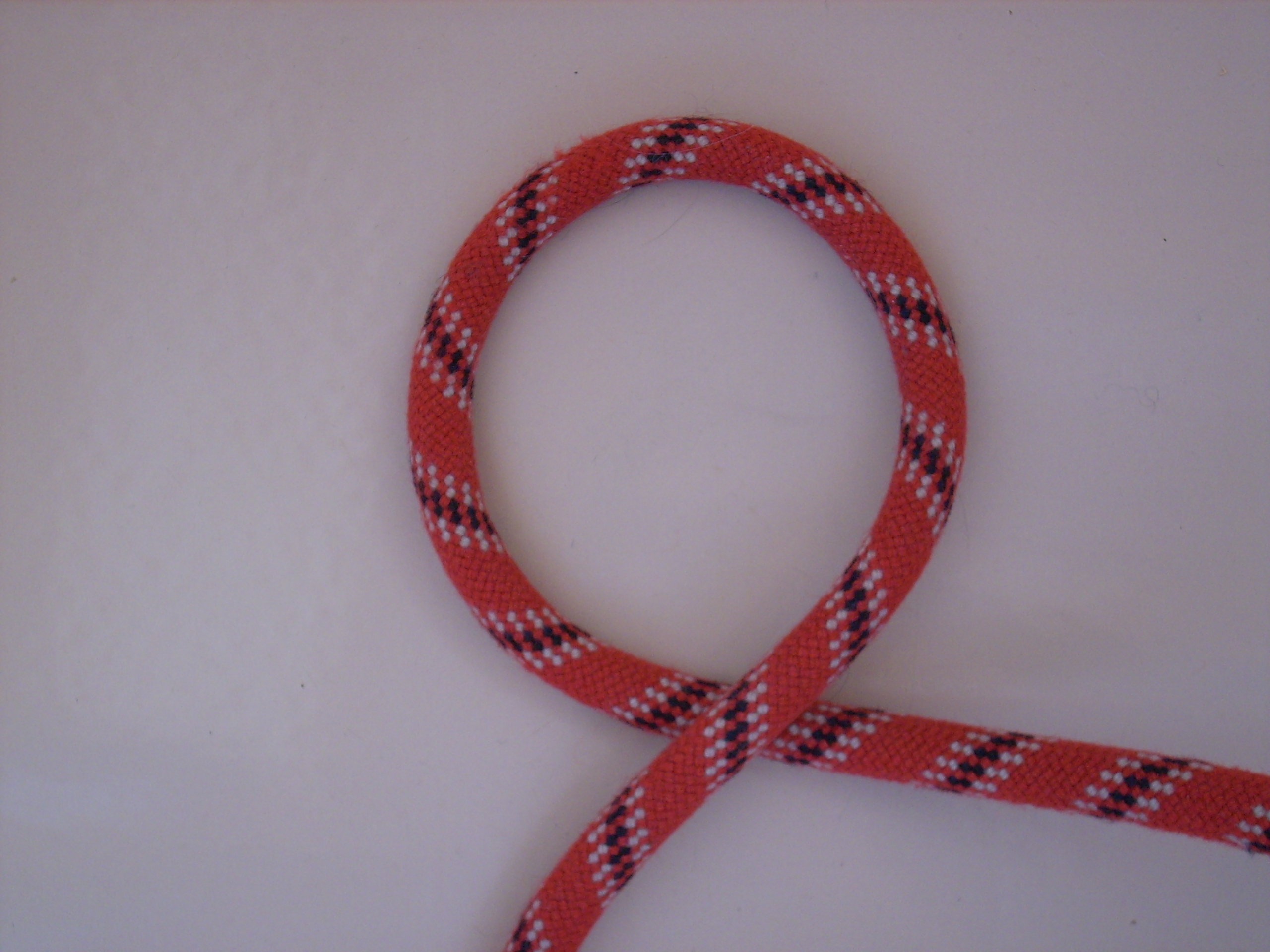
Make an eye, the working end is shown on the right.

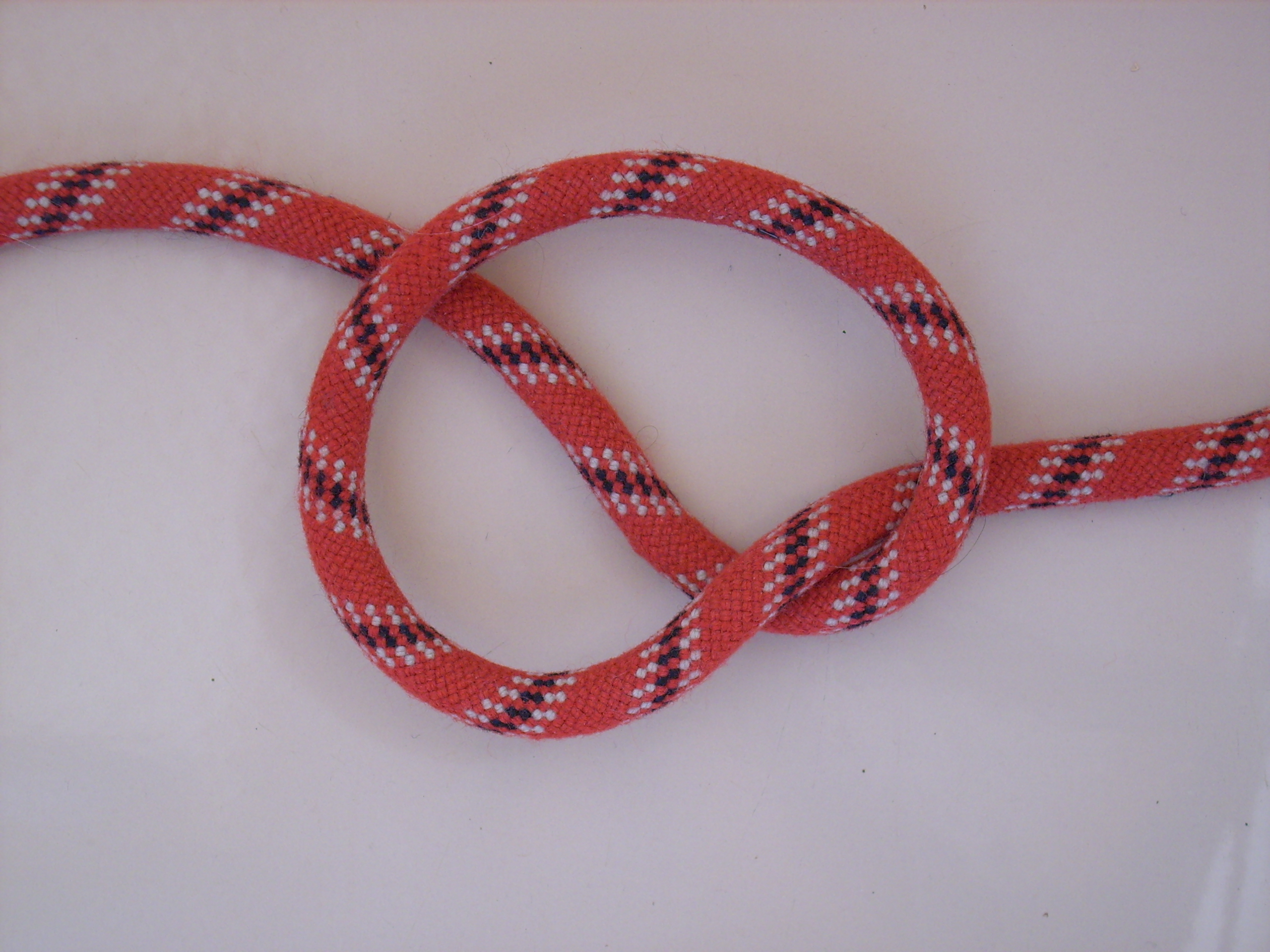
Bring the eye left and down, in front of the standing part.

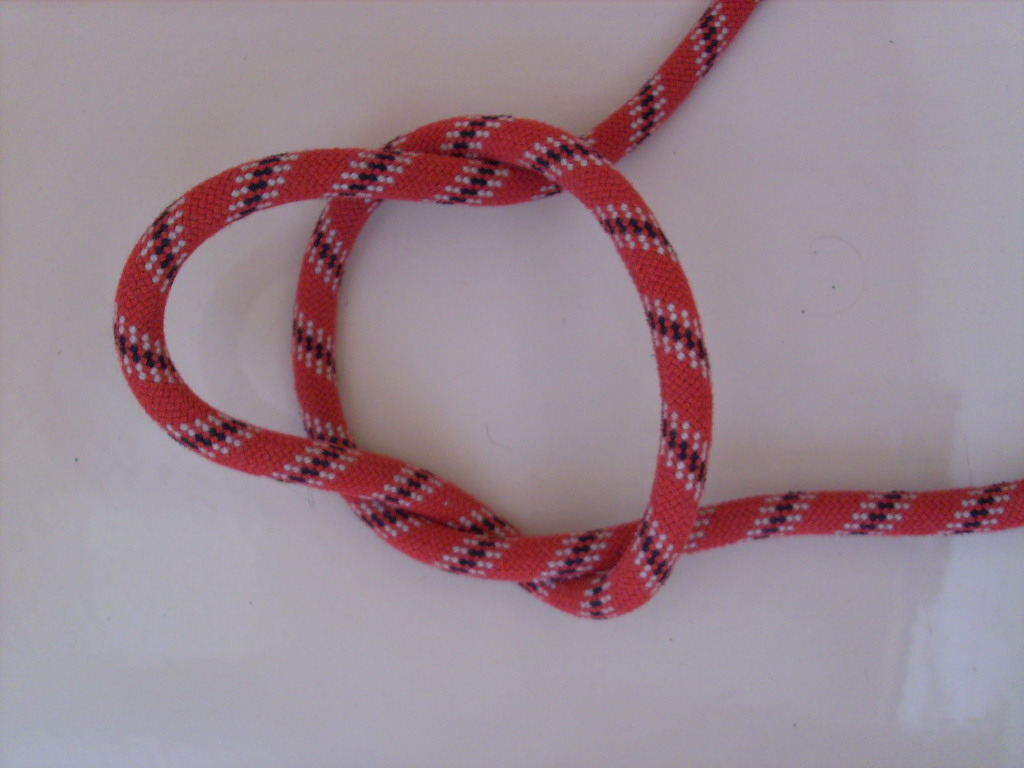
Pull the standing part through the eye, forming a bight. The working end is shown below the standing end.

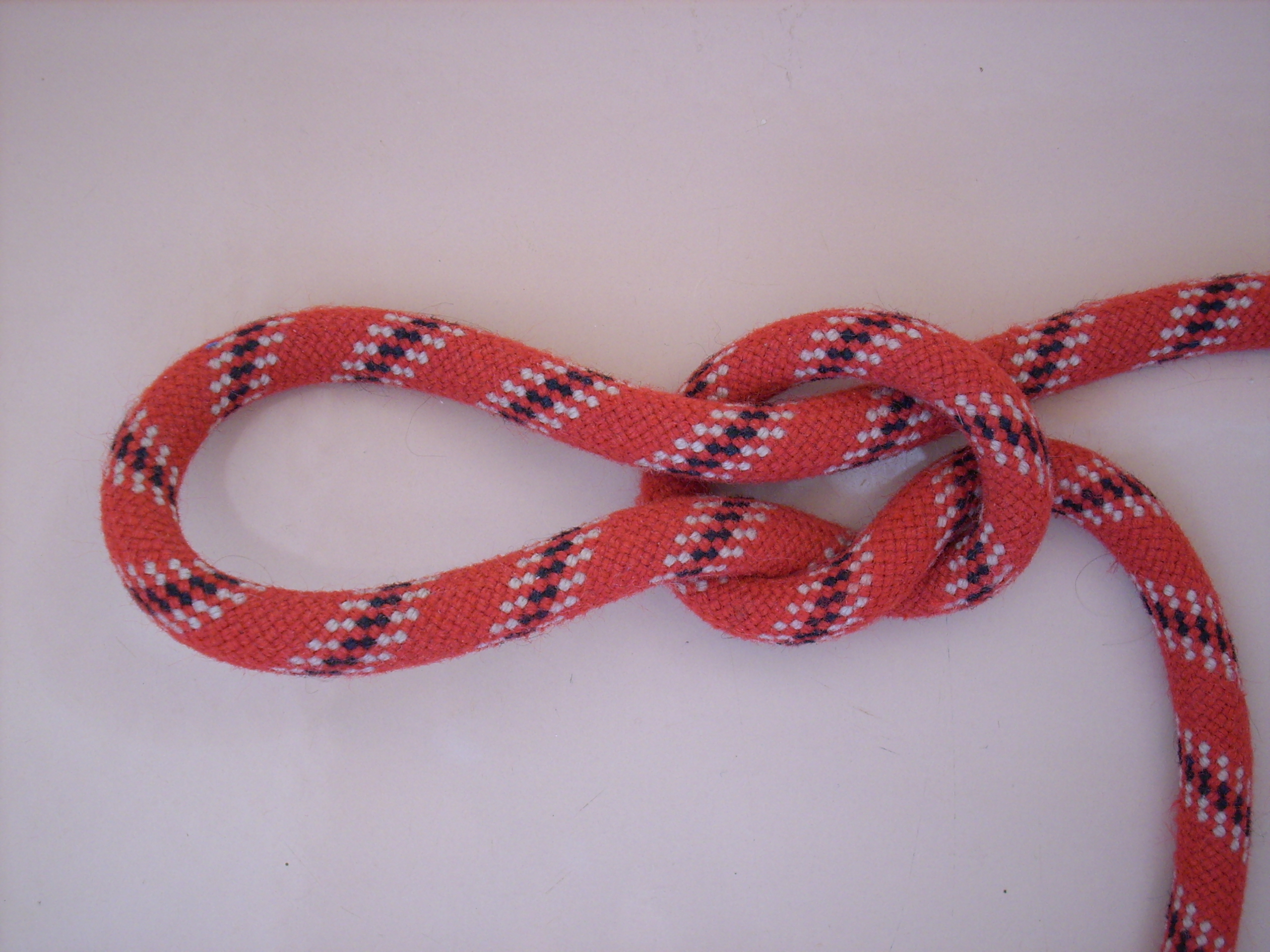
Tighten

== Similar knots ==
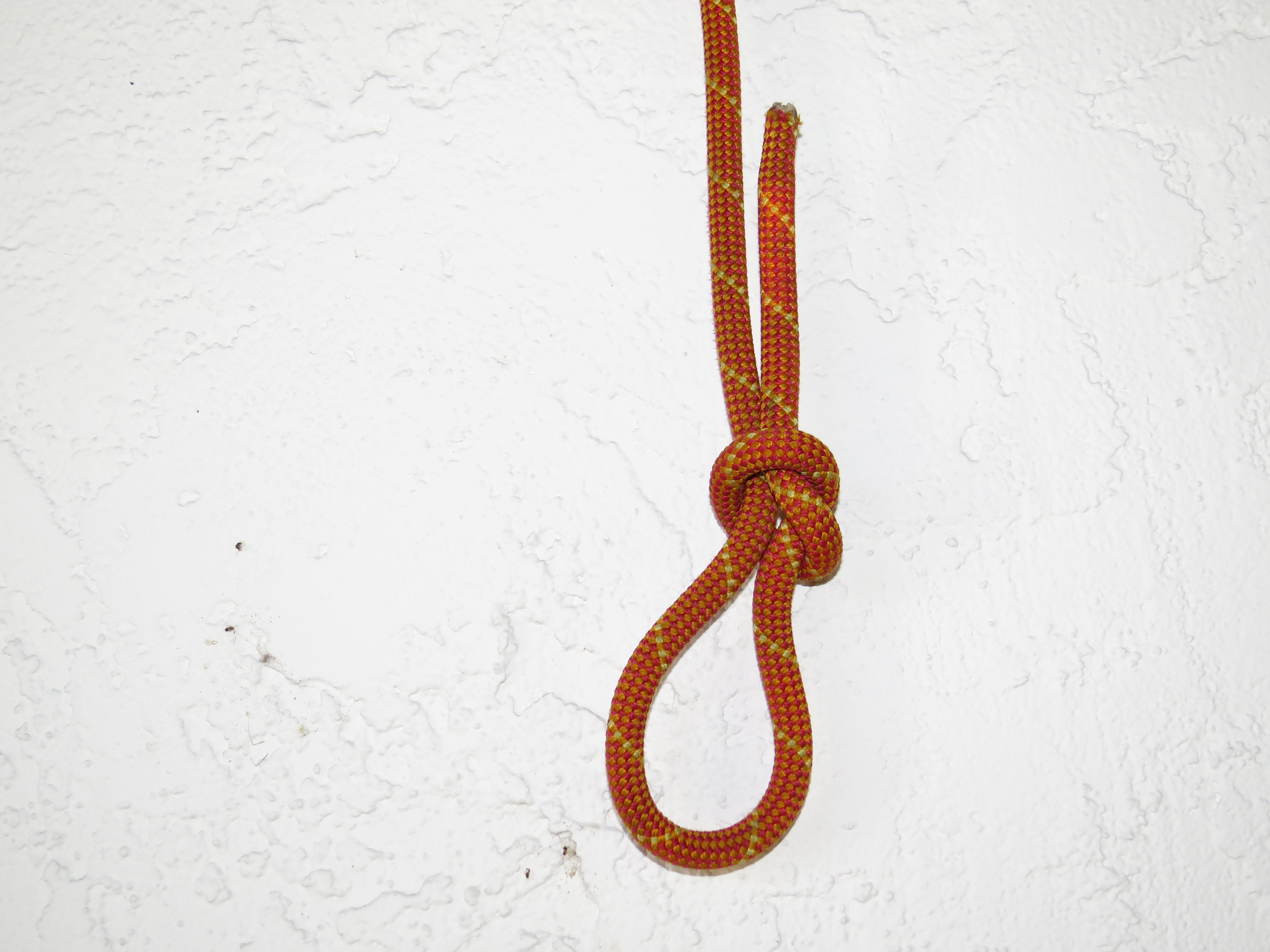
Noose
ABOK 43

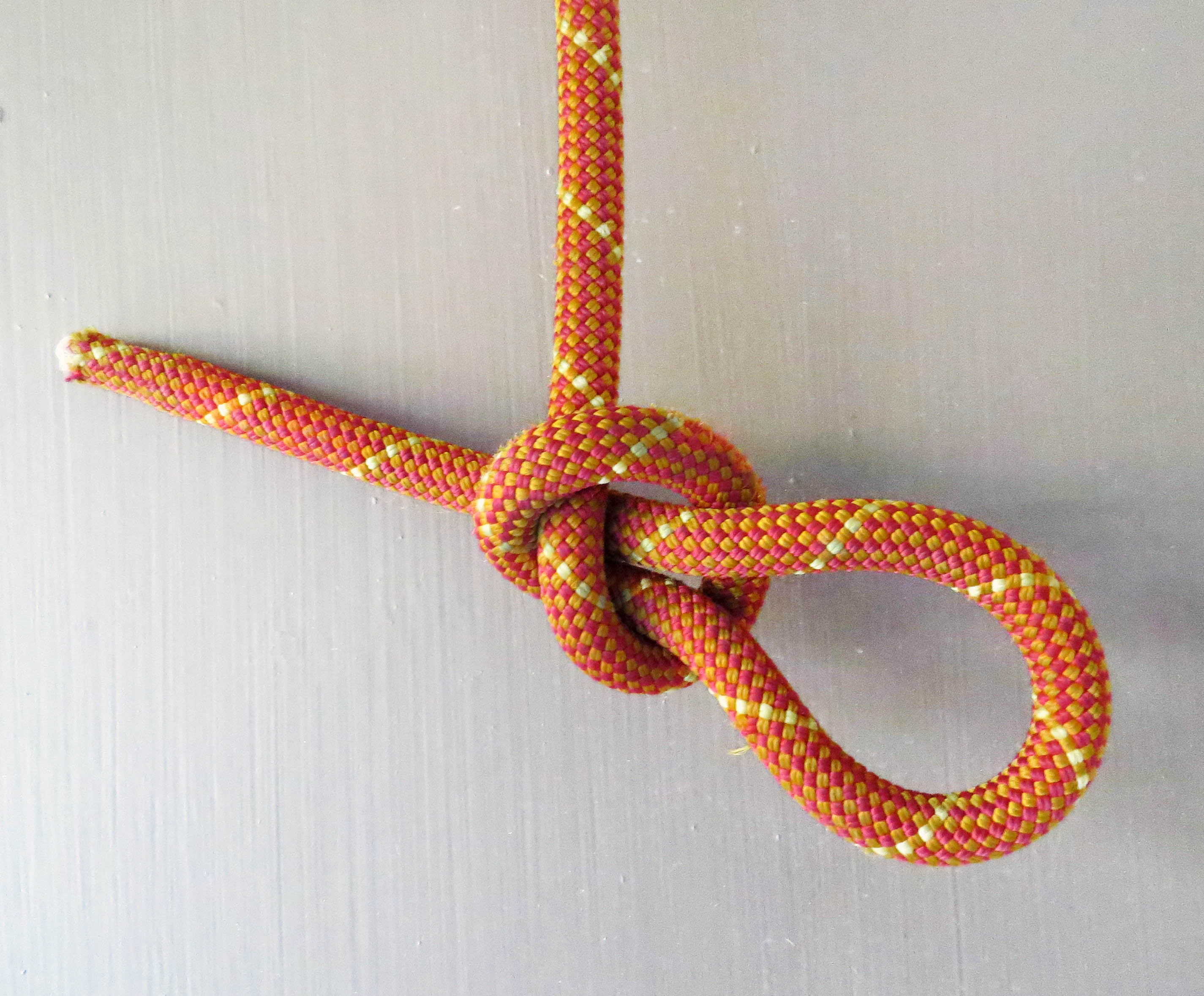
Slip knot
ABOK 529

== See also ==
- List of knots
