= Barrel hitch =

Knot used for hoisting loads

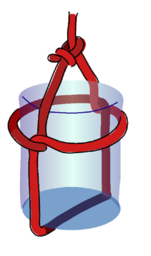
- Names: Barrel hitch, Barrel Sling
- Category: Hitch
- Related: Overhand knot, bowline
- ABoK: #459, #2176 and #2177

The "barrel hitch" and "barrel sling", named for their use in hoisting cargo aboard ships, are two simple yet effective ways to suspend an object. The barrel sling lays the barrel on its side, while the barrel hitch keeps it vertical. They work by forming a "sling" around the object, which supports it from either side and underneath.

The barrel sling (not pictured) is made with a strop. The barrel is laid on its side, both sides of the strop are spread out and passed underneath, the ends of the strop are raised together, one end is tucked through the other and hooked to an eyehook. The tightened knot looks like a cow hitch. A cow hitch and bowline can achieve the same effect and are called a "cow hitch hoist". The barrel hitch for lifting bales of hay is called a "bale sling hitch".

== Tying ==
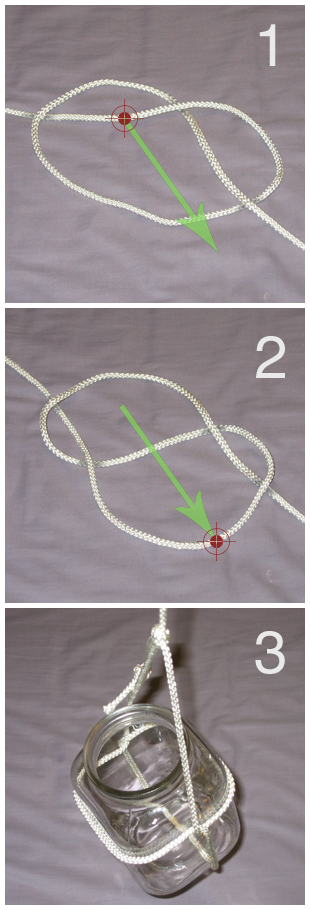
How to tie a barrel hitch

- The barrel hitch is made by tying an overhand knot, leaving plenty of free rope at the working end. Where the rope crosses itself in the middle of the knot (near the target), grab the strand of rope on top and bring it towards you, then lay it back down. The result should resemble stage 2: note where the target is.
- Place your object on top of the diagonal strand of rope in the centre of the knot.
- Carefully draw the rope up at the working and fixed ends, forming the "sling" around the object. Tie the working end off using a bowline, making sure the sling is tight around the object.

== See also ==
- List of knots
