= Trucker's hitch =

Type of knot

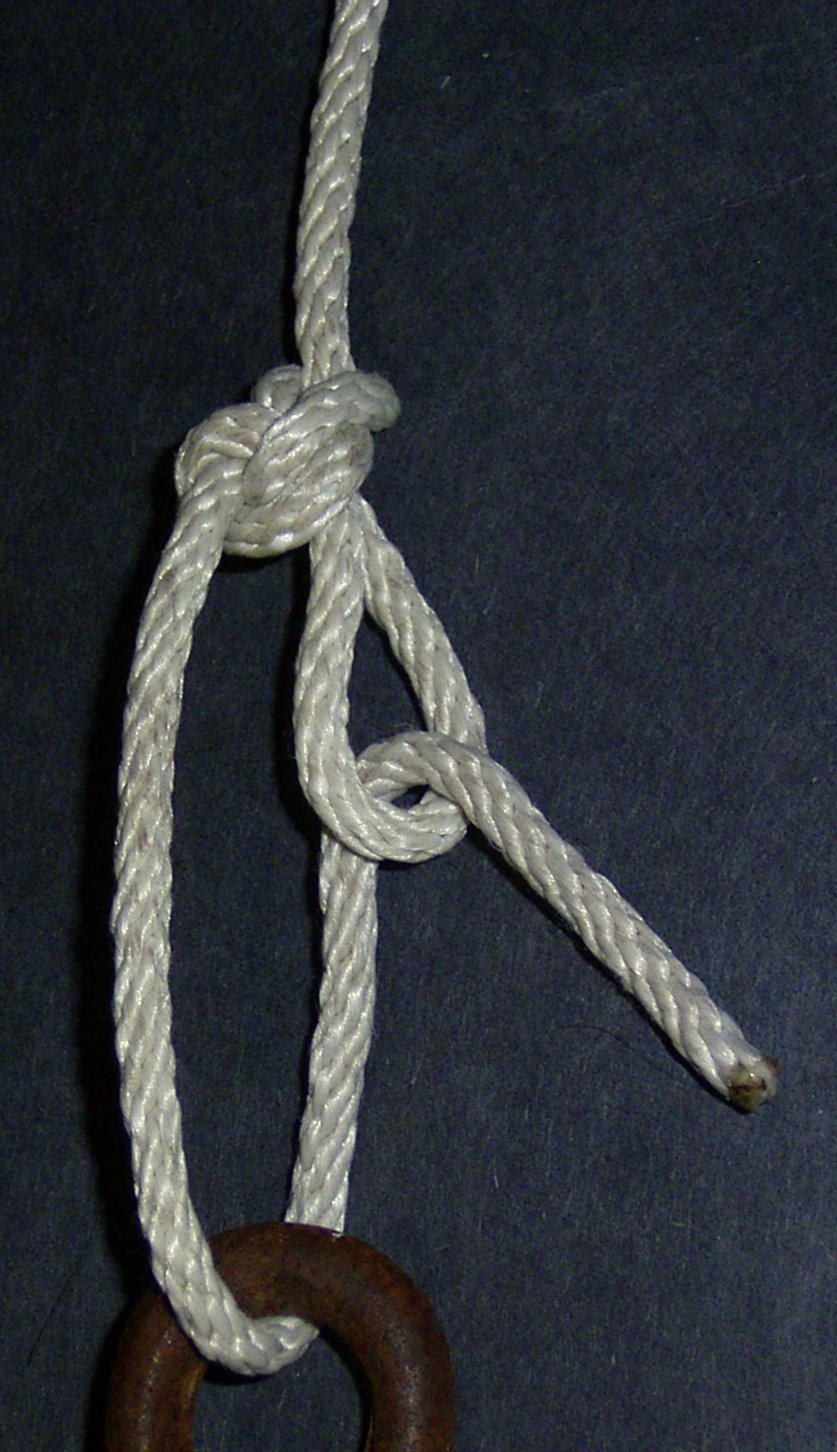
- Trucker's hitch with alpine butterfly loop
- Names: Trucker's hitch, dolly knot, Wakos transport knot, lorry driver's hitch, harvester's hitch, hay knot, sheepshank cinch, trucker's dolly, wagoner's hitch, power cinch, rope tackle
- Category: Hitch
- Related: versatackle knot, sheepshank
- Typical use: Making a rope very tight, such as to secure an object to a vehicle
- Caveat: Can produce excessive wear on rope, especially if tied repeatedly in the same spot
- ABoK: #1514, #2124, #2125, #2126
- Instructions

The trucker's hitch is a compound knot commonly used for securing loads on trucks or trailers. The general arrangement, using loops and turns in the rope itself to form a crude block and tackle, has long been used to tension lines and is known by multiple names. Knot author Geoffrey Budworth claims the knot can be traced back to the days when carters and hawkers used horse-drawn conveyances to move their wares from place to place.

== Variations ==
The portion of the trucker's hitch which differs in the following variations is the method used to form the loop which the working end slides through to produce the mechanical advantage. The different methods of forming the loop affect the ease and speed of tying and releasing, and the stability of the final product.

The variations are presented in order of increasing stability.

=== Sheepshank style loop ===
This version of the knot uses a sheepshank, in this kind of application also known as a bell ringer's knot, to form the loop. It is quicker to make than a fixed loop, but is less dependable. It is avoided in critical applications (such as securing a load on a truck) as it can fall apart under too little load or too much load, and can capsize if not dressed properly. However, this knot may be made secure by adding a Half Hitch to the top bight of the Sheepshank. This form of the trucker's hitch is least likely to jam, coming apart easily once tension is released. Different sources show slight variations in the way the sheepshank portion is formed and dressed.

Versions popular in East Asia use variations of sheep shank using either a simple half hitch or a double turn self crossing half hitch or a triple turn self crossing half hitch. A sheep shank with two consecutive half hitches i.e. a clove hitch to secure the upper eye and to form the lower eye is more popular in the west.

=== Slipped overhand loop ===
The loop formed in one version is a simple Slipped Overhand Loop. This version is good for light to moderate loads.

=== Simple friction loop ===
Another version uses a multiply twisted bight to pass a bight of the working end to form the eye of the loop. This version tolerates higher load.

=== Fixed loop ===
The most reliable common variation uses a fixed loop, such as an alpine butterfly loop, artillery loop, figure-eight loop or directional figure-eight loop, or another of many suitable loop knots. If a fixed loop is used repeatedly for tying the trucker's hitch in the same portion of rope, excessive wear or other damage may be suffered by the portion of the loop which working end slides against.

If extra loops are used to form the eye it tends to ease untying. In order to prevent the closing of the loop under load, the loop must be formed by the working end of the rope (which will later pass through the loop). If the standing end goes through the loop, it will close under load.

== Finishing the hitch ==
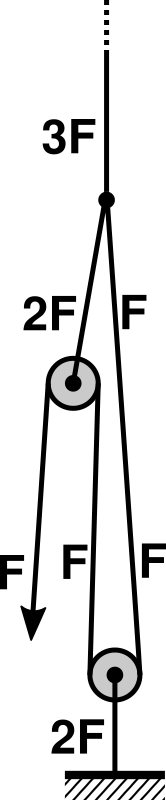
Diagram showing the (theoretical) 3:1 mechanical advantage of the Trucker's Hitch

In tightening the trucker's hitch, tension can be effectively increased by repeatedly pulling sideways while preventing the tail end from slipping through the loop, and then cinching the knot tighter as the sideways force is released. This is called "sweating a line".

If the tail end is wrapped through the last loop twice, the resulting friction may render manual cinching unnecessary.

Once tight, the trucker's hitch is often secured with a half hitch, usually slipped for easy releasing and to avoid the necessity of access to the end of the rope, though a more secure finish, such as two half-hitches, may be called for. Under large loads, the finishing half hitch can jam, especially if it is not slipped; the difficulty of releasing it can be compounded by the fact that the knot is typically still under tension when it is to be untied.

Finishing with a taut-line hitch or a Farrimond friction hitch to the standing part allows the finishing knot to be tied and untied with no tension. This eliminates any jamming problems and also allows the line to be re-tensioned if necessary.

A mechanical advantage of ideally 3:1 can nearly be achieved when using an equivalent setup with pulleys, but is reduced substantially by friction when using knots.

== See also ==
- Load securing
- List of knots
