= Rolling hitch =

Knot used to attach a rope to a rod, pole, or another rope

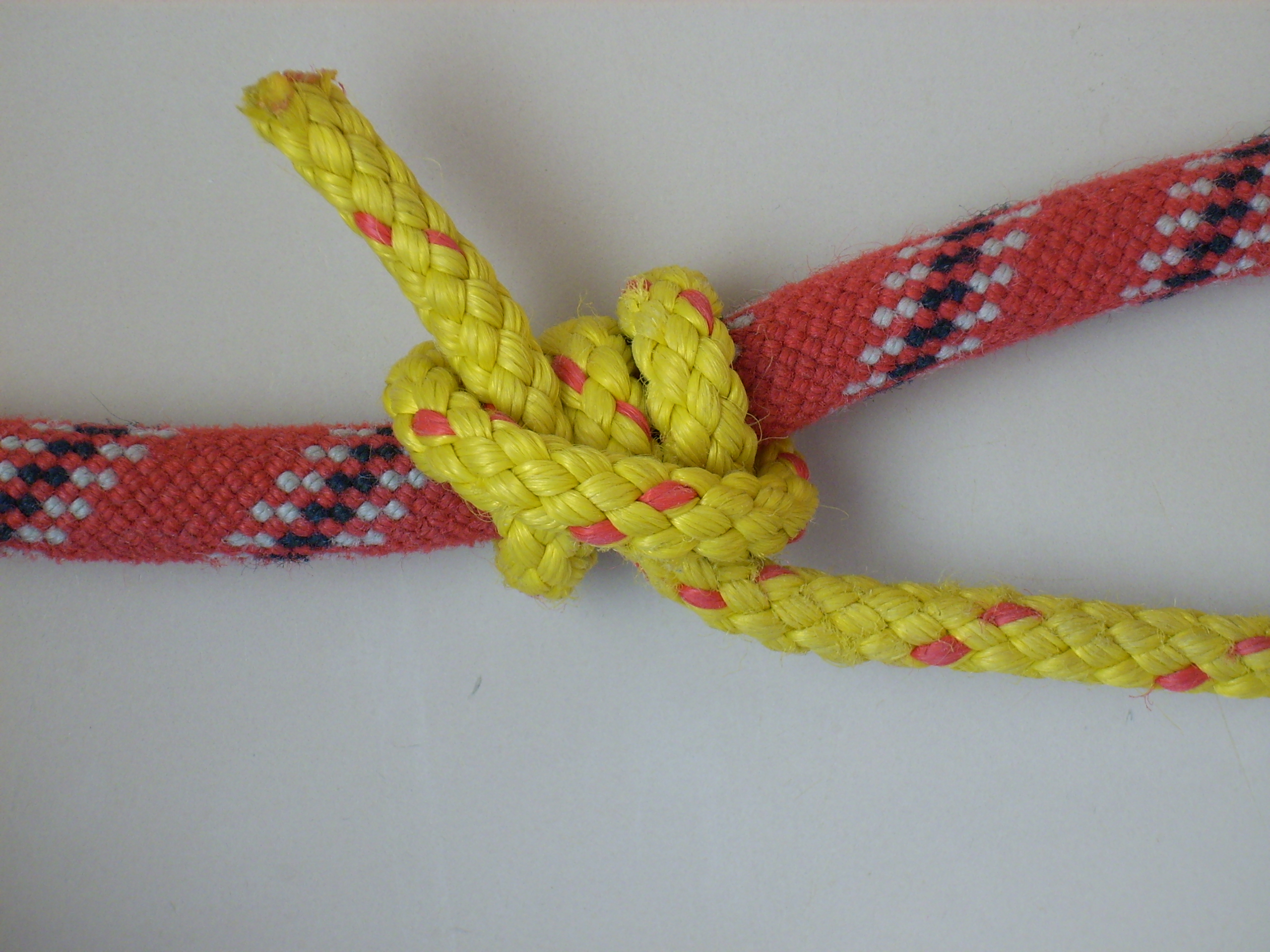
- Names: Rolling hitch, Magnus hitch
- Category: Hitch
- Related: Taut-line hitch, Icicle hitch, Jamming knot
- Typical use: Sailing
- ABoK: #503, #1190, #1465, #1466, #1681, #1734, #1735, #1736, #1791, #2555

The rolling hitch is a knot (see also Magnus hitch) used to attach a rope to a rod, pole, or another rope. A simple friction hitch, it is used for lengthwise pull along an object rather than at right angles. The rolling hitch is designed to resist lengthwise movement for only a single direction of pull.

A common usage while sailing is for rigging a stopper to relax the tension on a sheet so that a jammed winch or block can be cleared.

== Naming ==
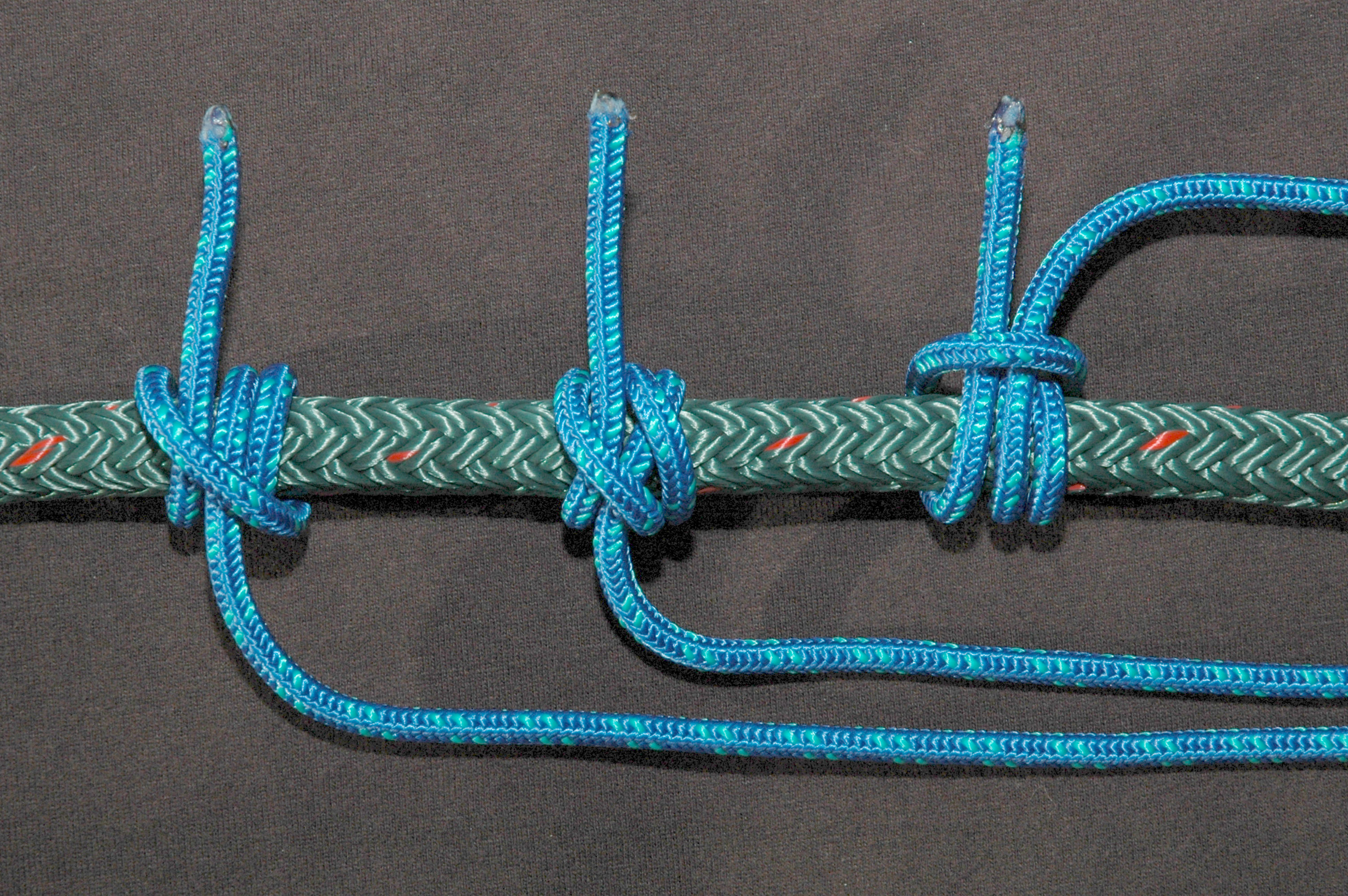
Names and reference numbers from ABOK, left to right: "Rolling Hitch (1)" (#1734), "Rolling Hitch (2)" (#1735), "Magnus Hitch" (#1736)

At the turn of the 19th century the knot now known as the "rolling hitch" was called the "Magnus hitch" or "Magner's hitch", and the name "rolling hitch" referred to two round turns and two half-hitches. In 1841 Richard Henry Dana Jr. used the present-day names in his work The Seaman's Friend, and subsequent authors have continued to use this terminology.

There are two slightly different hitches commonly known by the name of "rolling hitch". The Ashley Book of Knots identifies these two variations as "Rolling Hitch (1)" and "Rolling Hitch (2)" and numbers them #1734 and #1735 respectively. Despite the potential for confusion with the older usage, Ashley chose the name "Magnus Hitch" to refer to knot #1736, which is simply #1734 tied with the final hitch made in the opposite direction. Since two distinct variations of the rolling hitch are widely referred to by the same name, and Magnus hitch now may refer to a different knot than it used to, the use of Ashley reference numbers for these related hitches can eliminate ambiguity when required. These hitches are pictured at the right.

When a rolling hitch or Magnus hitch is tied around the standing part of the rope to form an adjustable loop, it is often referred to as a taut-line hitch or one of several other names, although some sources fail to differentiate by using a separate name. Ashley shows this use as #1855, #1856 and #1857.

== Tying ==
=== Rolling Hitch (1) #1734 ===
This version is preferred when attaching a rope to pole or rod. It is effectively a clove hitch with an extra initial turn.

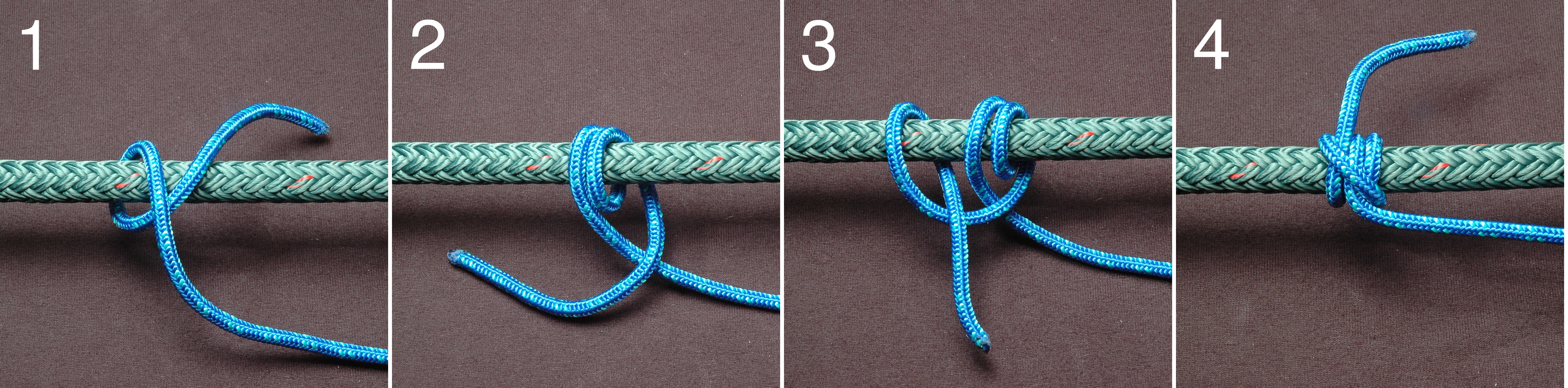

1. Start with a turn around the object. Bring the working end towards the direction of pull and between the standing part and the object.
2. Make another wrap around the object, completing a round turn. The wraps of the round turn should progress towards the desired direction of pull. Bring the working end out over the standing part away from the direction of pull.
3. Complete with a half hitch, moving around the object in the same direction as the first turns, as for a clove hitch.
4. Dress by snugging the hitch around the object before applying load.

=== Rolling Hitch (2) #1735 ===
This version is preferred when attaching rope to another rope. The first two turns create an awning hitch − a temporary hitch used by riggers when adjusting tent lines. These first two turns are merely a subtle rearrangement in the position of the turns of #1734.

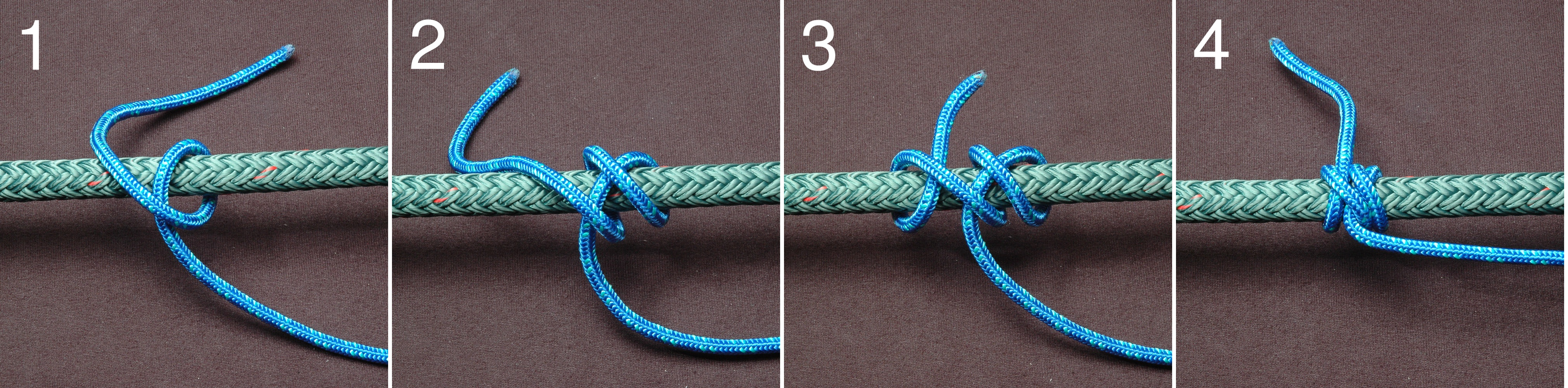

1. Begin by making a turn around the object, bringing the working end back between the object and the standing part. Cross over the standing part away from the desired direction of pull.
2. Make a second turn that exactly follows the first, and hence also passes between the object and standing part and then crosses over the standing part, away from the direction of pull. Make sure the second turn "tucks" between the first turn and the standing part; that is what gives this version extra grip when made around another rope.
3. Finish with a half hitch, moving around the object in the same direction as the first turns, as for a clove hitch.
4. Dress by snugging the hitch around the object before applying load.

=== Magnus Hitch #1736 ===
This is tied exactly as #1734, but with the final hitch in the opposite direction. It can be more tricky to snug-up, since both lines emerge from the same side of the hitch, but it has less tendency to twist under load.

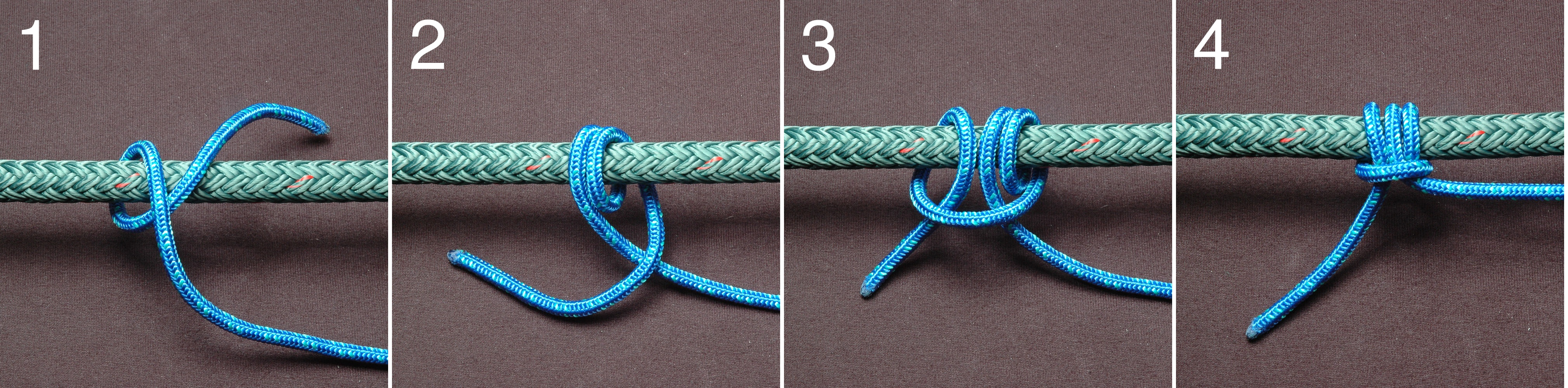

1. Start with a turn around the object. Bring the working end towards the direction of pull and between the standing part and the object.
2. Make another wrap around the object, completing a round turn. The wraps of the round turn should progress towards the desired direction of pull. Bring the working end out over the standing part away from the direction of pull.
3. Complete with a half hitch, moving around the object in the opposite direction as the first turns, as for a cow hitch.
4. Dress by snugging the hitch around the object before applying load.

== Security ==
If the hitch is not made very snug before applying any strain, it will not tighten further under load. When hitching to another rope, Ashley and other sources suggest #1735 is more secure. Ashley also states that #1736 has less tendency to twist and marks it “best for the purpose”.

Though effective for moderate loads, the rolling hitch cannot be depended on to hold fast under all conditions. Using stiff and slippery modern fiber ropes, the rolling hitch may be difficult to make hold at all. Friction hitches with additional wraps and more complex structure may provide more security.

The August 2009 edition of Practical Sailor magazine tested various knots used for lengthwise tension applications, and came to the conclusion that when using modern synthetic rope the rolling hitch could not be regarded as secure. They recommended the Icicle hitch as a replacement.

== See also ==
- Taut-line hitch: Closely related adjustable hitch
- Adjustable grip hitch: Another related hitch
- Midshipman's hitch: Secure taut-line hitch
- Icicle hitch: More complex and effective friction hitch
- The Ashley Book of Knots: Knot reference work
- List of friction hitch knots
