= Cat's paw (knot) =

Type of knot

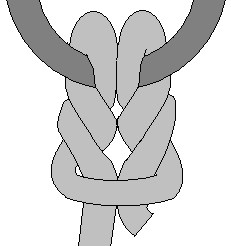
- Category: Hitch
- Origin: Ancient
- Related: girth hitch, lark's foot, cow hitch
- Releasing: Non-jamming
- Typical use: Attaching a rope to a hook or ring
- ABoK: #1891

The Cat's paw is a knot used for connecting a rope to an object. It is very similar to the cow hitch except there is an additional twist on each side of the bight, making it less prone to slipping.

The cat's-paw is the common hook hitch for slings. It is the same basic form as the bale sling hitch but has additional twists. Brady says "two or three altogether", and Steel, who mentioned the name in 1794, says "three twists". It is the best of all sling hitches and is often recommended for a slippery rope. But no hitch can slip when tied in a slings since it has no ends. All that is needed is a hitch that cannot jam, and this requirement the cat's-paw fills admirably. The knot spills instantly when removed from the hook. It is the hitch always used for heavy lifts.

— The Ashley Book of Knots

== Uses ==
- Attaching a sling (a rope that has been formed into a continuous loop) to a hook

== Comments ==
The knot balances the load between the two halves of the hitch, and is used in wharfs and docks. If one half fails, the other should hold until the load can be safely and swiftly lowered to the ground.

When the sling is long the knot can be pre-formed in anywhere in it, then slid over the end of a hook or post.

== Structure ==
Formed from a bight turned up over itself (like a girth hitch) but with extra twists on each side to achieve the desired friction.

== Tying ==
=== Method 1 ===
Form a bight in the middle of the line, and pull it back over itself like a girth hitch. This forms two loops, turned in opposite directions. Convert each loop into an elbow by adding a twist in the direction that will tend to tighten them (the wrong direction will undo the loop completely). Pass both elbow over the hook, rail or post and pull tight, taking care to push the bight up snugly against the turns.

=== Method 2 ===
If working end of the line has an eye in it, and the standing end is accessible, the knot can be tied to a closed ring, another eye, or a rail with inaccessible ends, as follows. Pass the eye around the ring or rail, then pass the standing end through its own eye (this effectively forms a girth hitch). Then pass the standing end through the eye again, and pull up tight, taking care to push the bight up snugly against the turns.

When using the cat's paw to join two eyes, this process may be repeated several times to give several turns - as many as five in a fine fishing monofilament. Then when tightened, instead of pulling the bight up against the turns, both eyes are pulled equally, to make neat coils of turns in both eyes, meeting halfway between them.

== See also ==
- List of knots
