= Farmer's loop =

Type of knot

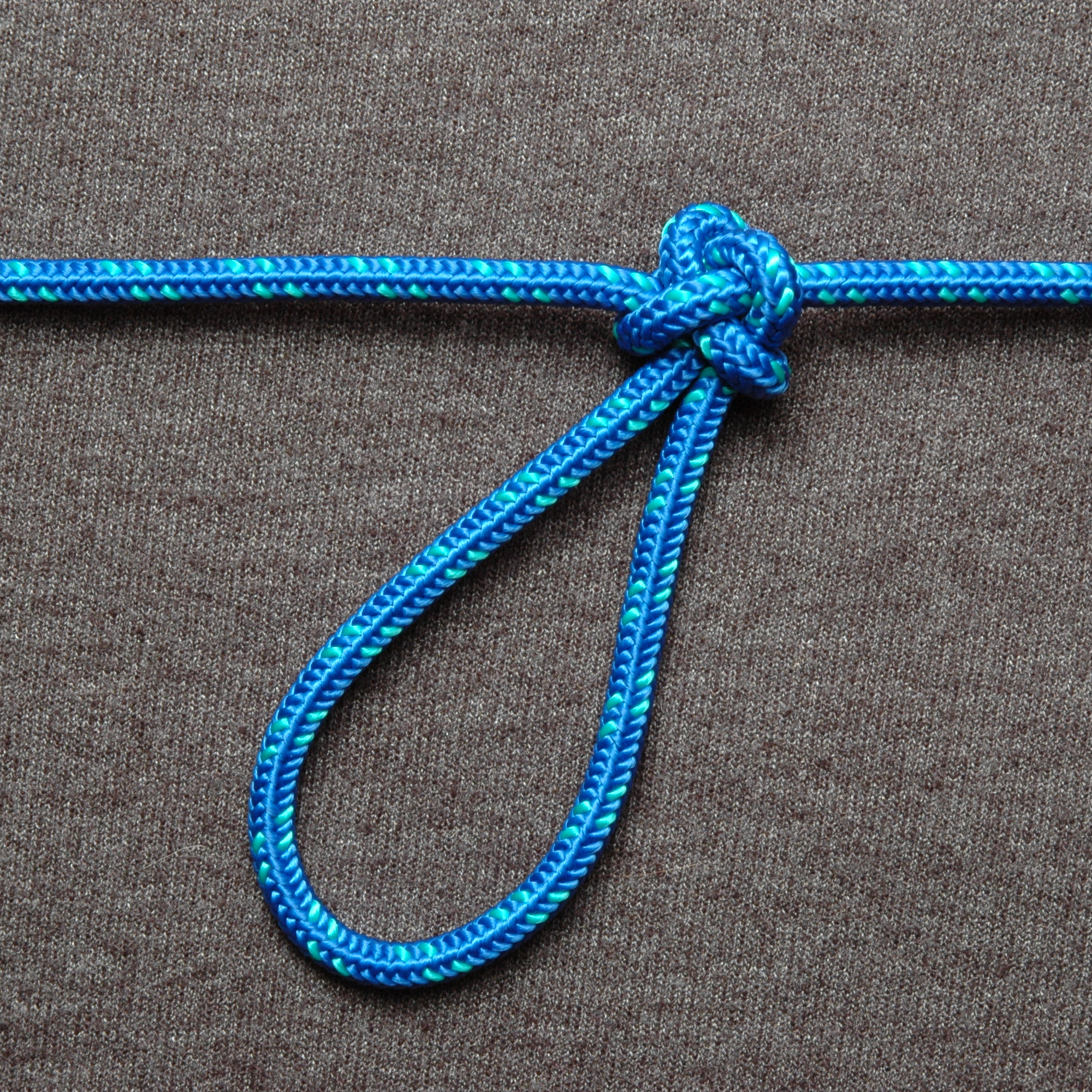
- Names: Farmer's loop, Wireman's knot
- Category: Loop
- Related: Alpine butterfly knot, Artillery loop, Span loop
- Releasing: Non-jamming
- Typical use: Climbing, agriculture
- ABoK: #1054, #1056, #2565

The farmer's loop is a knot which forms a fixed loop. As a midline loop knot made with a bight, it is related to several other similar knots, including the alpine butterfly knot and artillery loop.

If pulled with one hand holding one end, the other hand holding the start side of the loop that is the continuation of the same end, before tightening the knot of the loop, it may capsize to a slip knot with a complicated and heavy knot.

It is tied on one hand to make a loop about twice the size of that hand (use fingers for a smaller one, thumb-hook-to-elbow for a large one), as follows:

1. start with the rope 3 times around the palm of one hand, let the ends hang down,
2. then pull the initial middle turn up from the top edge and place it over to the right (of the right loops top edge)
3. then pull the now new middle turn up from the top edge and place it over to the left
4. then pull the now new middle turn up from the top edge and place it over to the right
5. then pull the now new middle turn up to form the loop, dress and tighten before use

The knot is a good one on all three counts—lead, security, and strength. Moreover, the method of tying is both ingenious and distinctive, and once mastered, it is not apt to be forgotten.

To tie: Take three turns around the left arm or hand, according to the size of the material being used. Move the center turn to the outside three times, as indicated by the arrows, first right, then left, and finally right again. Finally, pull out (extend) the center turn, and the knot is ready for use.

— The Ashley Book of Knots

== History ==
Cornell University professor Howard W. Riley published this knot in an agricultural extension pamphlet devoted to farming knots in 1912. He was shown the knot by a farmer at the 1910 Genesee County Fair in Batavia, New York. Riley noted that he had never seen the knot described in any reference book.

== See also ==
- List of knots
