= Hoxton knot =

Method for tying a scarf for wear

The Hoxton knot, Chelsea knot, French loop, Parisian scarf knot or Snug Tug is a method of arranging a scarf about the neck. The scarf is doubled back and placed around the neck. The tails of the scarf are then pulled through the U-bend of the doubling to secure them, as with a cow hitch or lark's head.

The knot is popular with stylish men like David Beckham who frequent fashionable districts of London such as Hoxton and Chelsea. The style is also commonly used by outside broadcasters from the BBC as it is warm and tidy.

== See also ==
- Snood – the snug, tubular comforter which generated similar controversy when worn by football players.
