= Span loop =

Type of knot

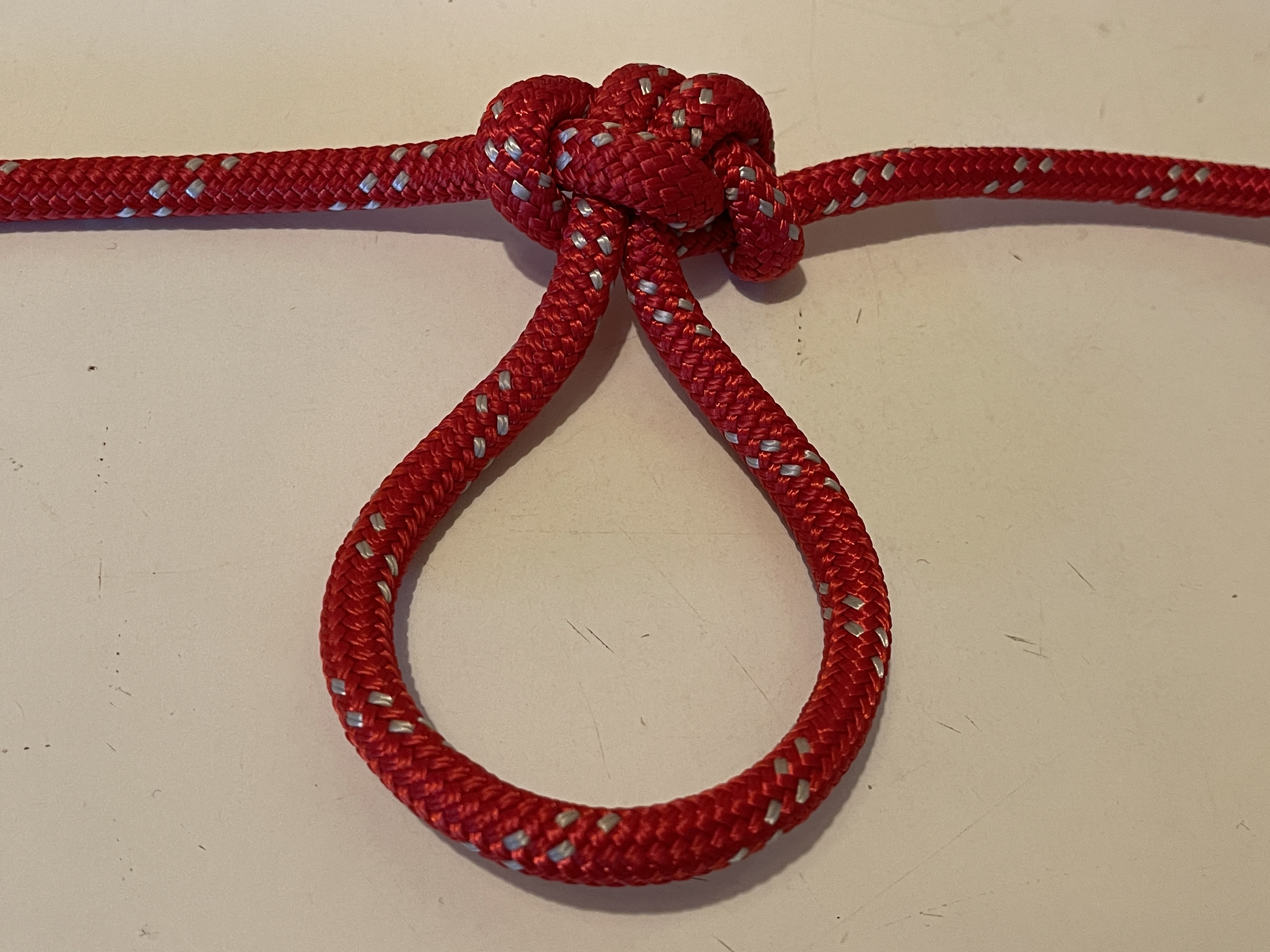
- Category: Loop
- Related: Butterfly loop, Farmer's loop, Artillery loop
- Releasing: Non-jamming
- ABoK: #1049

A span loop is a non-jamming loop that can be tied away from the ends of the rope.

== Information ==
The span loop is known for being extremely easy to untie. The beginning of tying this knot begins with tying a Half Sheepshank, which is also known as a Bell Ringer's Knot. In order to tie this, the same one-handed twist method employed for tying a bowline can be used. One bight or loop will poke up through the half-hitch, and it will perfectly match the end of the rope that is also poking up through the signature half-hitch part of a bowline as it is done with the one hand twist method. The next thing to do is to push the bottom loop back up and through the top loop.

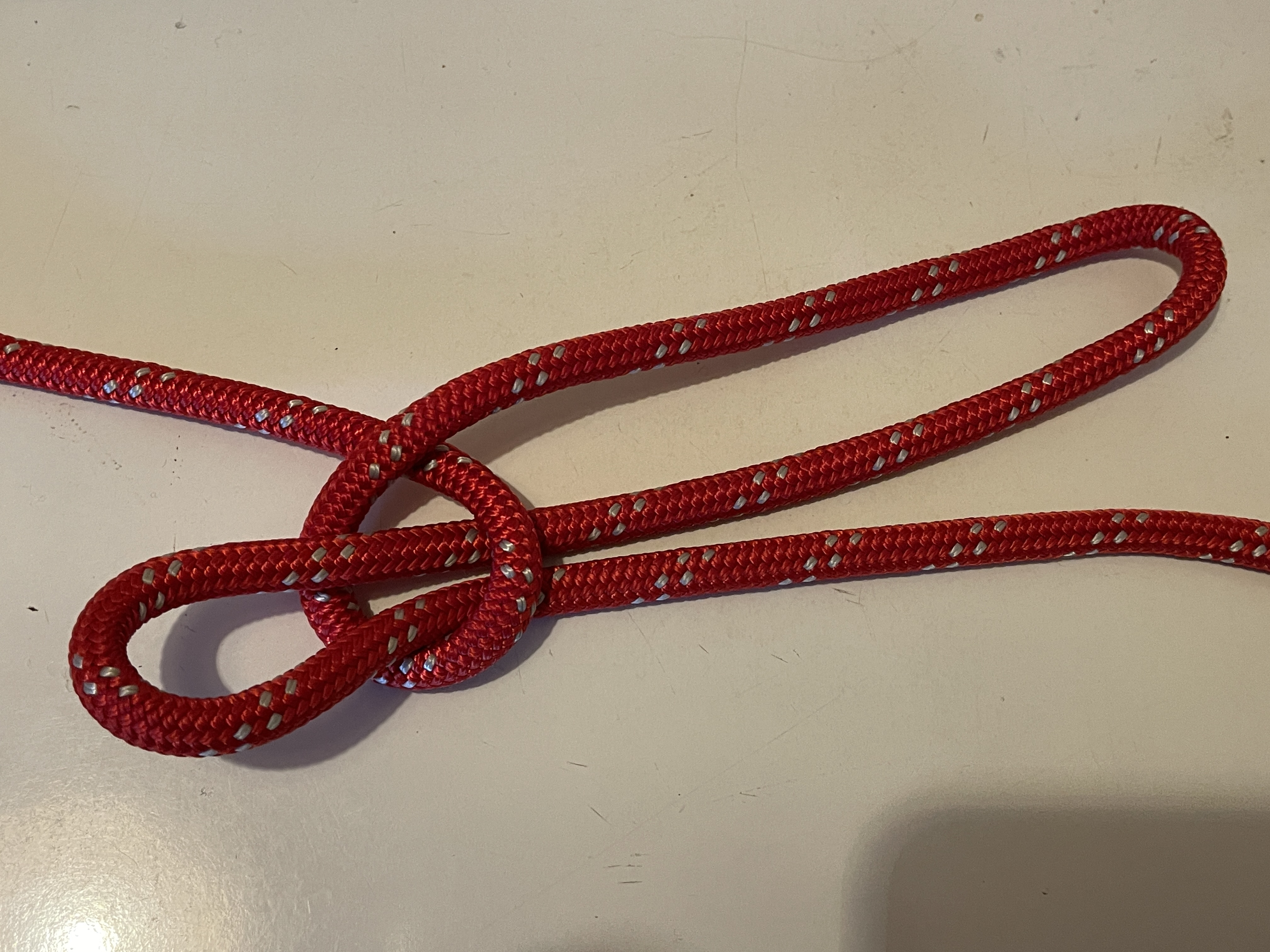
half a sheepshank

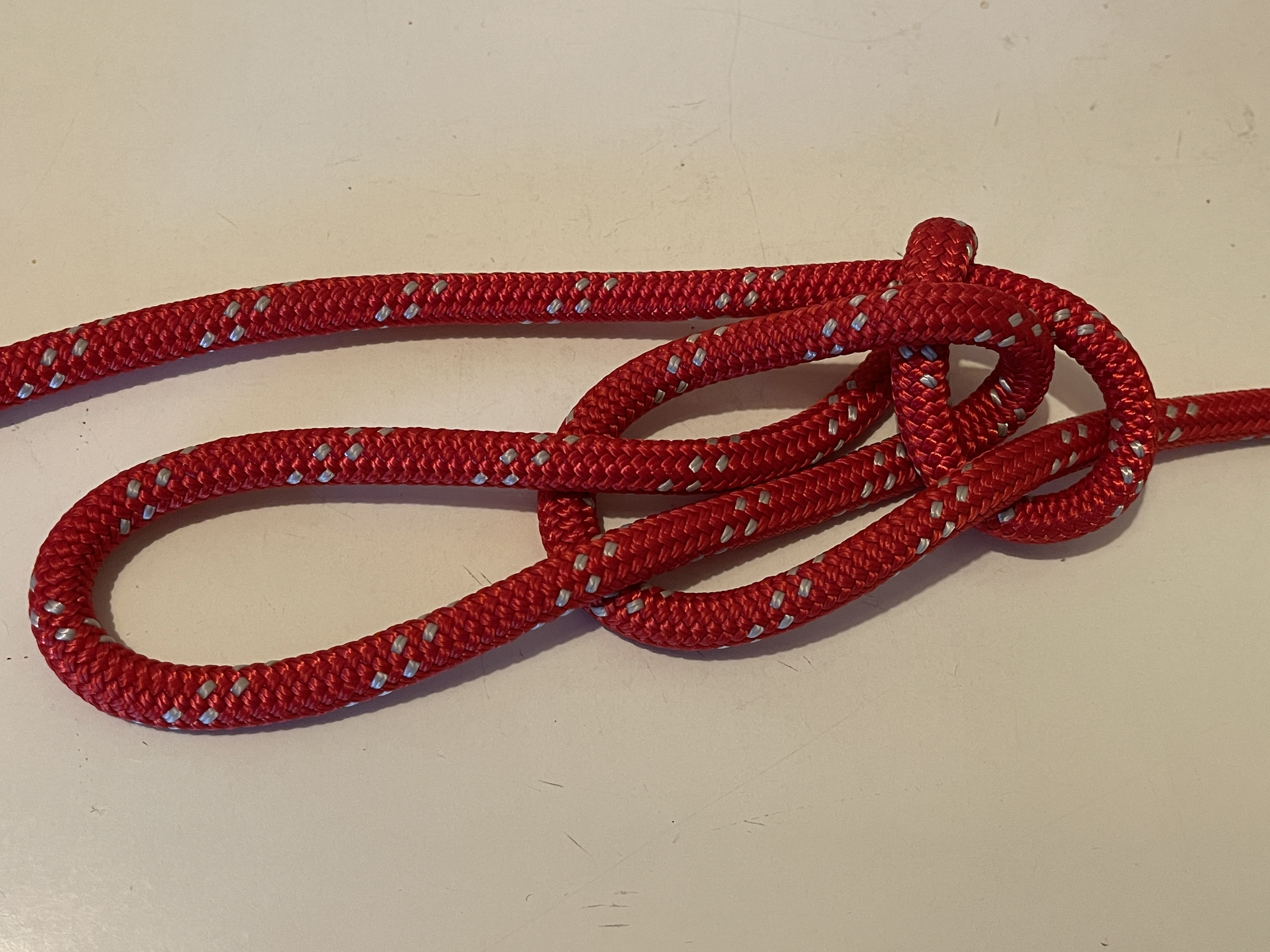
loop through loop

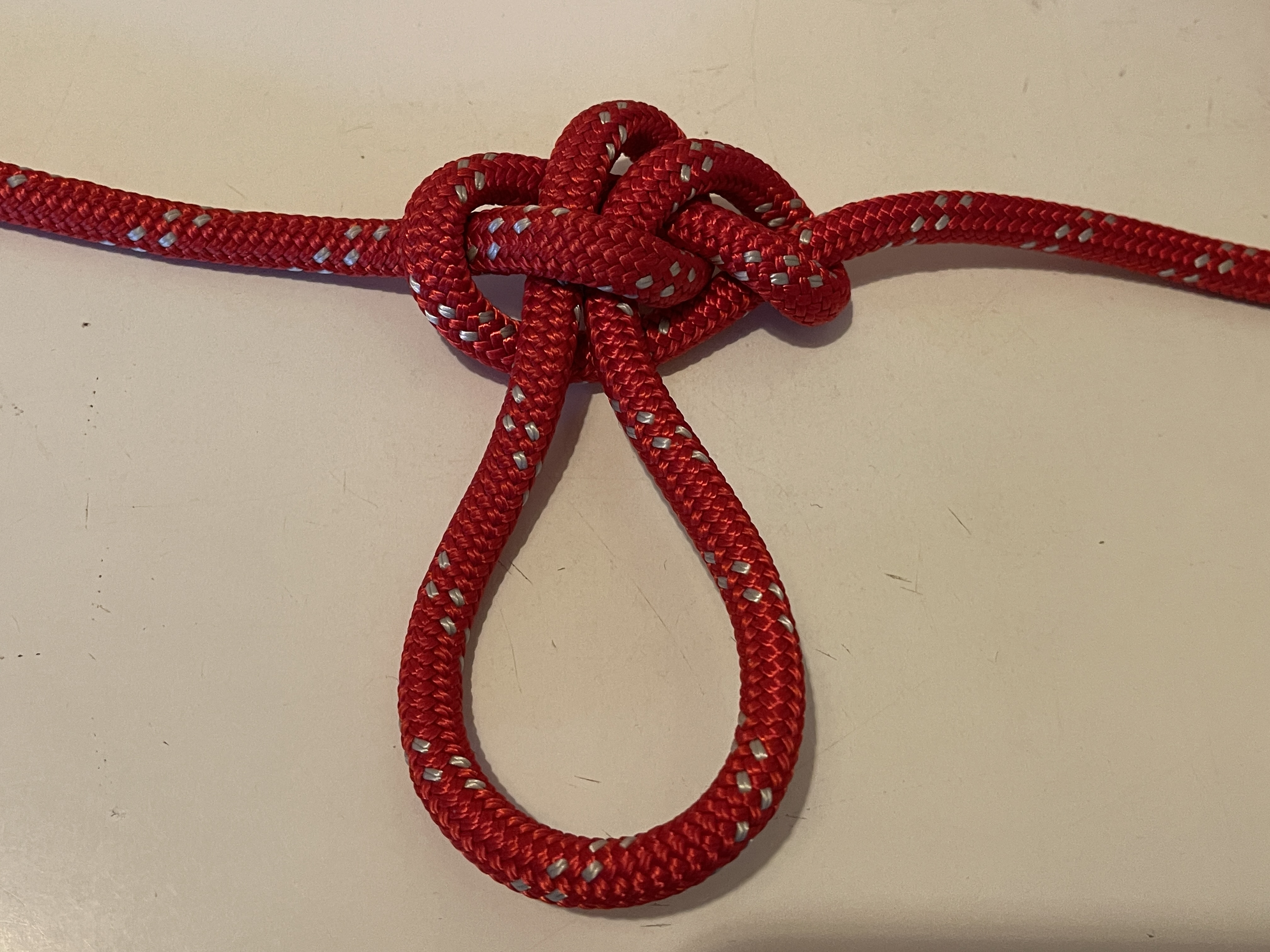
untightened

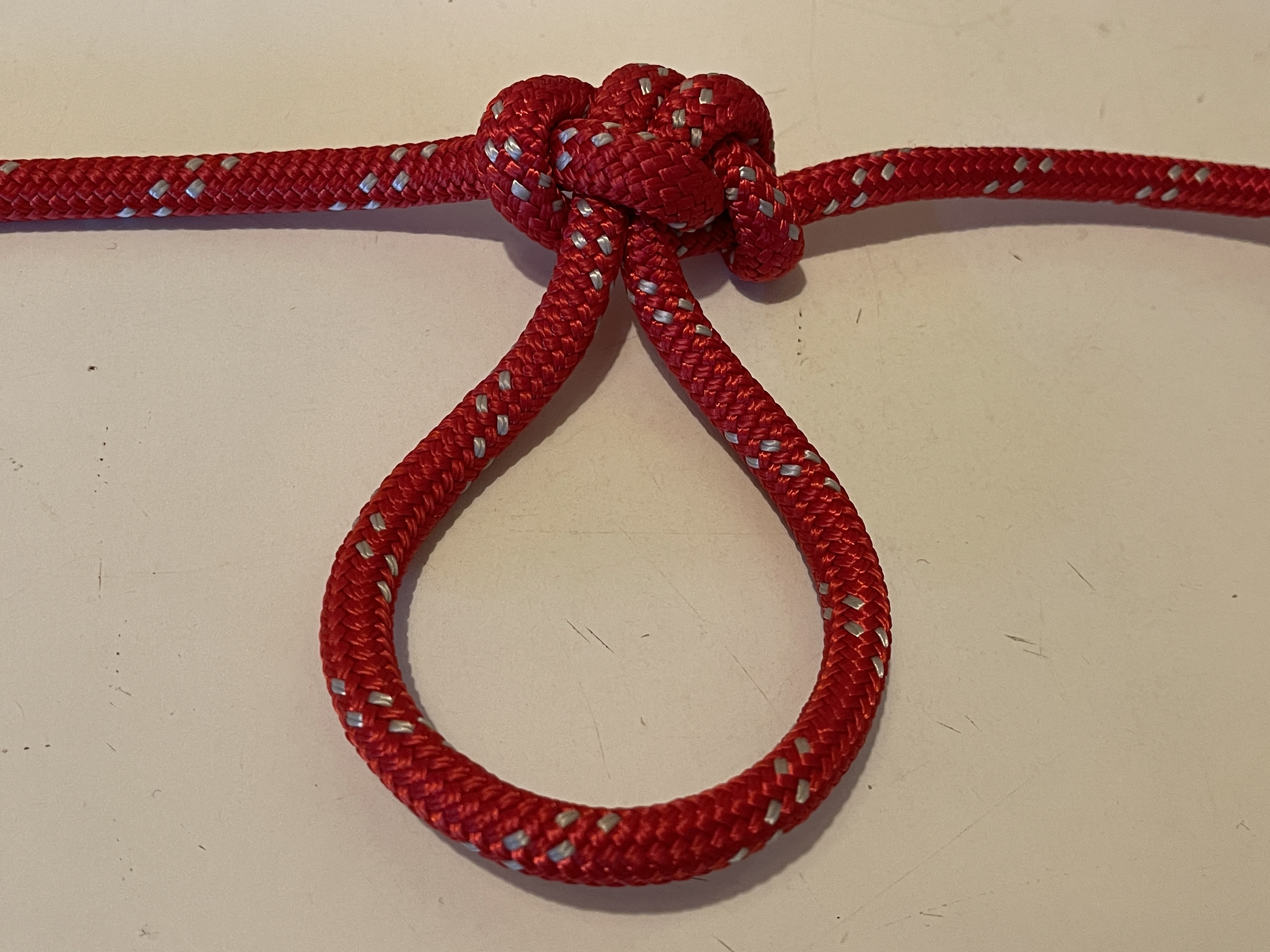
tightened
