= Butterfly loop =

Knot used to form a fixed loop in the middle of a rope

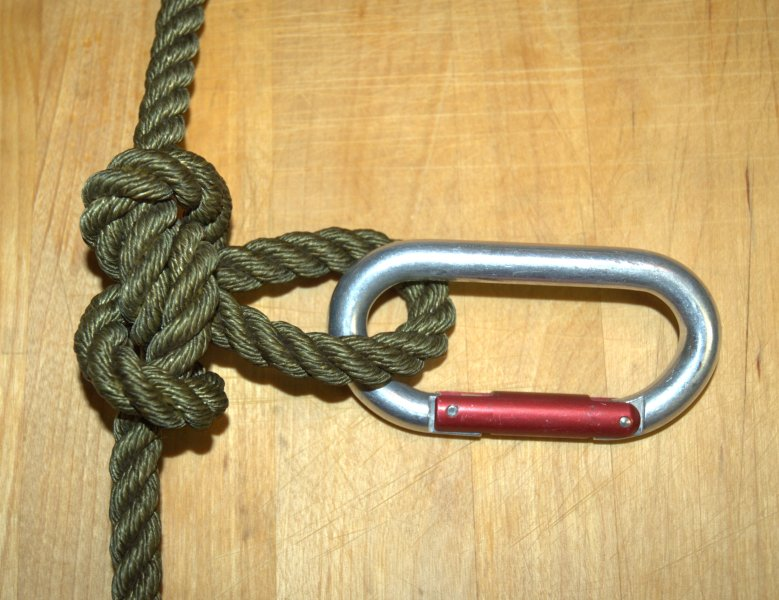
- A butterfly loop with a carabiner.
- Names: Butterfly loop, alpine butterfly knot, butterfly knot, lineman's loop, lineman's rider
- Category: Loop
- Related: Alpine butterfly bend, farmer's loop, artillery loop, span loop
- Releasing: Non-jamming
- Typical use: Fixed loop on the bight. Isolating a worn section of rope.
- ABoK: #331, #532, #1053
- Instructions

The butterfly loop, also known as lineman's loop, butterfly knot, alpine butterfly knot and lineman's rider, is a knot used to form a fixed loop in the middle of a rope. Tied in the bight, it can be made in a rope without access to either of the ends; this is a distinct advantage when working with long climbing ropes. The butterfly loop is an excellent mid-line rigging knot; it handles multi-directional loading well and has a symmetrical shape that makes it easy to inspect. In a climbing context it is also useful for traverse lines, some anchors, shortening rope slings, and for isolating damaged sections of rope.

== History ==
The earliest known presentation of the knot was in A.A. Burger's 1914 work Rope and Its Uses, included in an agricultural extension bulletin from what is now Iowa State University. Burger called the knot a lineman's rider stating it was often used by "linemen and especially telephone men". The knot's security and ability to withstand tension in any direction are both discussed.

The knot's association with mountaineering—and with butterflies—originates from a 1928 article in Alpine Journal by C.E.I. Wright and J.E. Magowan. The authors claim to have developed the butterfly noose themselves while attempting to improve the selection of knots available to climbers. The name is "so styled on the basis of a more or less fanciful resemblance imagined in the form of the knot." In the second part of the article they express dissatisfaction regarding their earlier use of the word "noose," since the knot is non-collapsing, and refer to the knot as butterfly loop or simply butterfly. Wright and Magowan call the butterfly loop "new," along with several other of their knots, in the sense they were unable to identify any earlier record of them. However, they prudently added that it "might be rash to claim they have never been used before."

Clifford Ashley presented the knot in 1944, calling it the "lineman's loop"; he attributed its first publication to J.M. Drew, but made no specific reference as to the source of this claim.

== Use ==
The knot is formed from a bight, twisted to form two eyes and then passed around the rope and through the first eye. Accordingly, it can be formed without access to either of the ends of the rope, making it especially useful in climbing and caving situations. Further detail on the knot's construction and use can be found in § External links, below. The loop bears loads along the rope in either direction or at right angles to it. The knot is easy to inspect, and works best with softer ropes.

It can be used to isolate a worn section of rope, where the knot is tied such that the worn section is isolated in the loop (which of course does not receive a carabiner nor bear any loads in this case). The loop portion is isolated when the other two legs are loaded, and in fact the butterfly can be tied as a bend with the ends emerging where the loop would be.

Errors in tying the butterfly loop can produce a similar looking but inferior knot, the so-called "false butterfly", which is prone to slipping. However, some sources suggest this behavior can be exploited purposely for shock absorption. Wright and Magowan called this less secure loop knot the "half-hitch noose".

== Variations ==
The double butterfly loop has two non-collapsing loops, allowing for two clip-in points, both of which have the same advantages and disadvantages of a single-loop butterfly.

== See also ==
- List of knots
