= Adjustable grip hitch =

Type of friction hitch

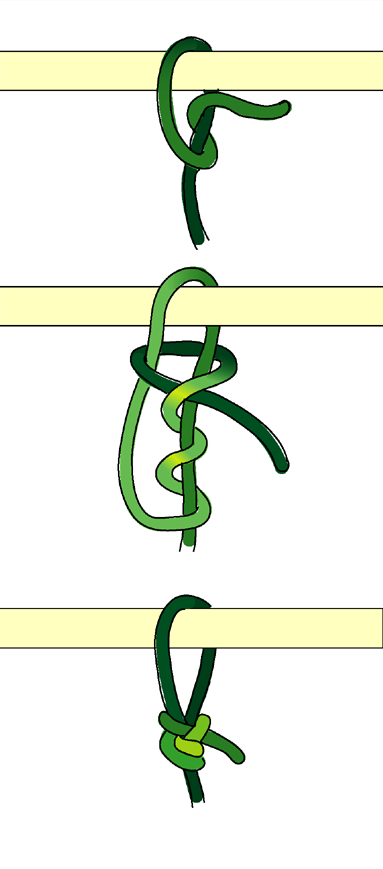
- Names: Adjustable grip hitch, Adjustable loop, Adjustable hitch, Adjustable bend, Adjustable Cawley Hitch, Cawley Hitch
- Category: Hitch
- Related: Taut-line hitch, Farrimond friction hitch
- Releasing: Non-jamming
- Typical use: Keep a rope taut
- ABoK: -

The adjustable grip hitch is a simple and useful friction hitch which may easily be shifted up and down the rope while slack. It will hold fast when loaded, but slip when shock loaded until tension is relieved enough for it to again hold fast. It serves the same purpose as the taut-line hitch, e.g. tensioning a tent's guy line.

This knot is also called the adjustable loop and Cawley adjustable hitch. It was conceived in 1982 by Canadian climber Robert Chisnall.

== Tying ==
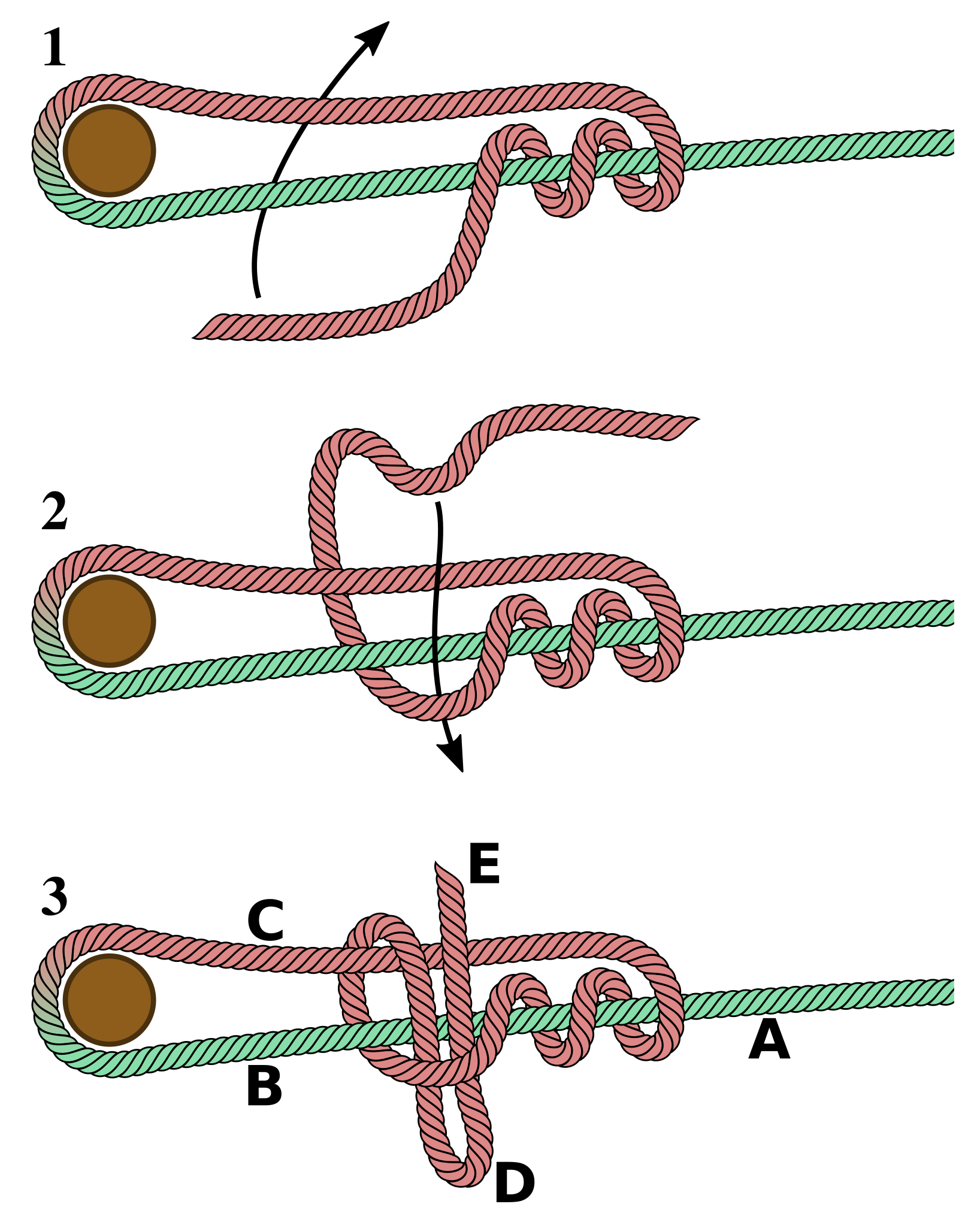
Tying the adjustable grip hitch (slipped)

The working end is wrapped inwards around the standing part (A-B) twice (1). Then another turn is made around both parts and a bight is pulled through the last wrap (2, 3) for the slipped version (left image), or just the end for the non-slipped version (right image). The knot needs to be pulled tight to actually grip (the slack is pulled out of the windings and the knot pulled tight at C and D). By pushing the knot along the standing part in direction of A, the line can be tightened.

The grip can be improved by adding a third turn around the standing part.

The slipped adjustable grip hitch can be easily untied by pulling the end E, even under quite heavy load.

== Adjustable Bend ==
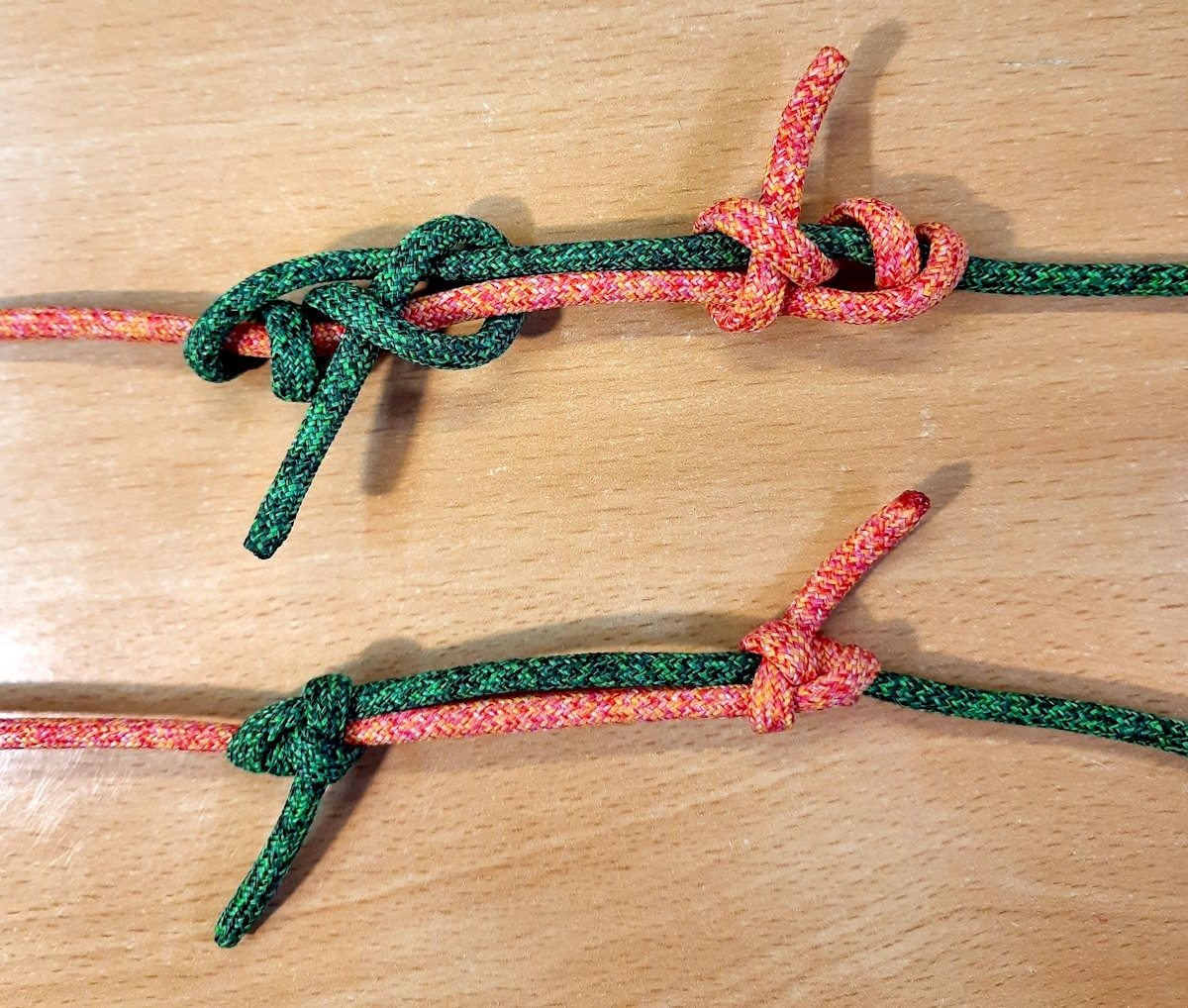
adjustable bend

Using the same knot core an adjustable bend can be made to join two lines. For that the knot is tied in both working ends, each around the other line's standing part. The length of the line can be then adjusted by pushing the knots together or apart.

== Alternatives ==
- The taut-line hitch and midshipman's hitch are more common for the same purpose. They are made of a rolling hitch around the standing part.
- An adjustable bend can also be made with rolling hitches around the other line.
- The Farrimond friction hitch can be tied in the bight.

== See also ==
- List of knots
- List of friction hitch knots
