= Artillery loop =

Type of knot

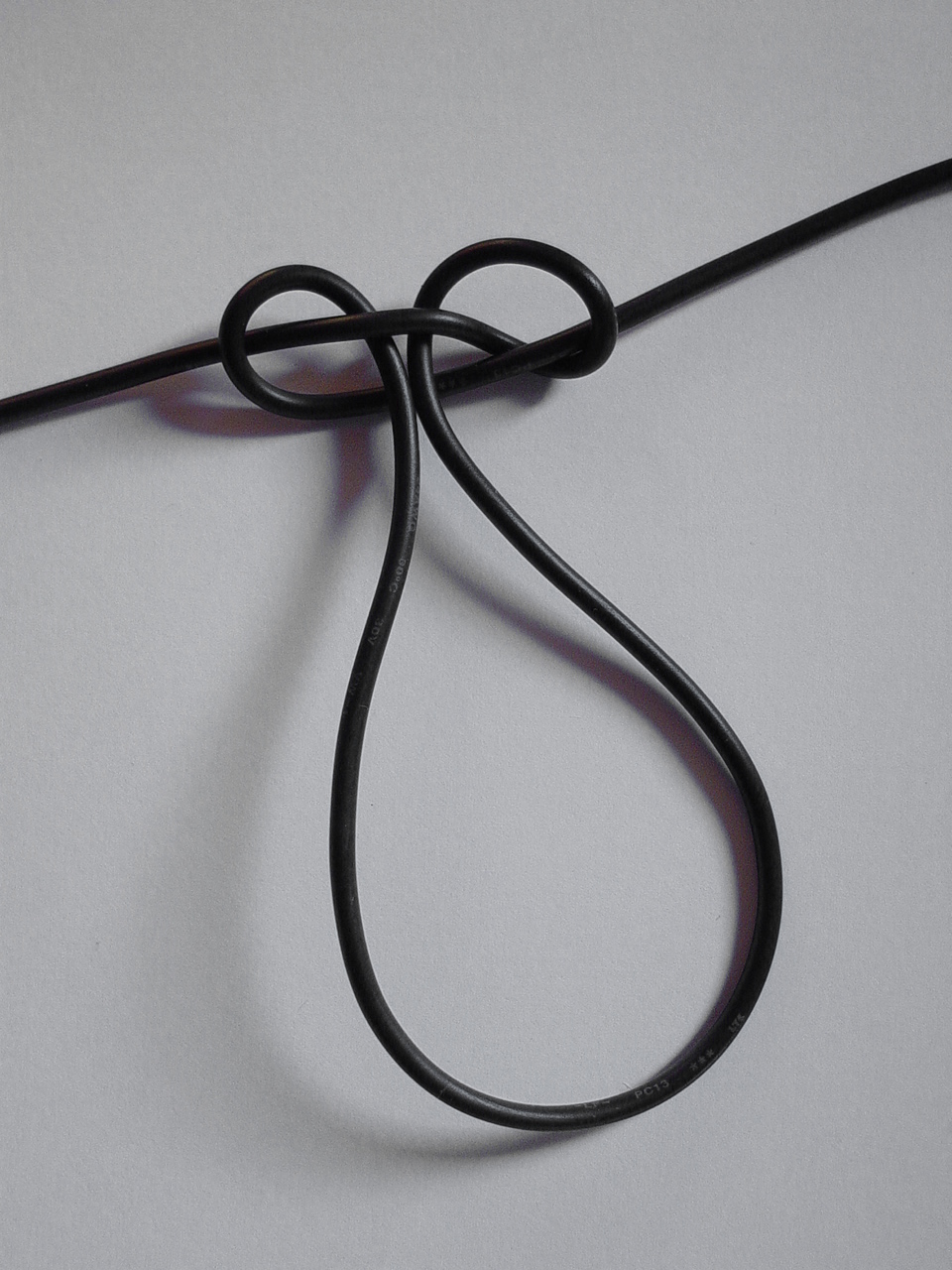
- Names: Artillery loop, Artilleryman's knot, Manharness knot, Manharness loop, Harness loop, Harness hitch, Belayer's hitch, Sandy Douglass knot
- Category: Loop
- Related: Farmer's loop, Alpine butterfly knot, Span loop, Marlinespike hitch
- Releasing: Non-jamming
- Caveat: Must have load, may slip unexpectedly under tension creating a running knot or noose
- ABoK: #153, #428, #532, #1050, #1051

The artillery loop is a knot with a loop on the bight for non-critical purposes. The artillery loop must have the loop loaded or it will slip and contract easily. It is an inferior knot to the alpine butterfly knot, possibly dangerously so, in that it can be yanked out of shape and turn into a running knot or noose.

Budworth states that this knot is often described as being best suited to take a load on only one of the ends, but reliable information on which end is difficult to find.

== Usage ==
The name harness loop derives from the fact that the knot was used when assisting horses on difficult terrain. Similarly, the name artillery loop or artilleryman's hitch derives from the fact that it was used when hauling field artillery into position.

== See also ==
- Harness bend
- List of knots
