= Bale sling hitch =

Type of knot

Bale sling hitch, Bale sling, Barrel sling, Strap hitch
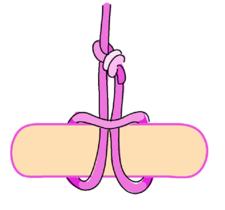
- Tied with a loop knot at the end of a rope
- Category: Hitch
- Related: Cow hitch
- Releasing: Non-jamming
- Typical use: Hoisting or lowering objects
- ABoK: #1694, #2163, #2168

The bale sling hitch (or strap hitch) is a knot which traditionally uses a continuous loop of strap to form a cow hitch around an object in order to hoist or lower it. In practice, a similar arrangement can also be formed using a fixed loop at the end of a rope. This loop could be formed at the end of a line with a knot, such as the bowline, or a large eye splice.

== See also ==
- List of knots
- List of hitch knots
