= Cow hitch =

Type of knot

Girth hitch
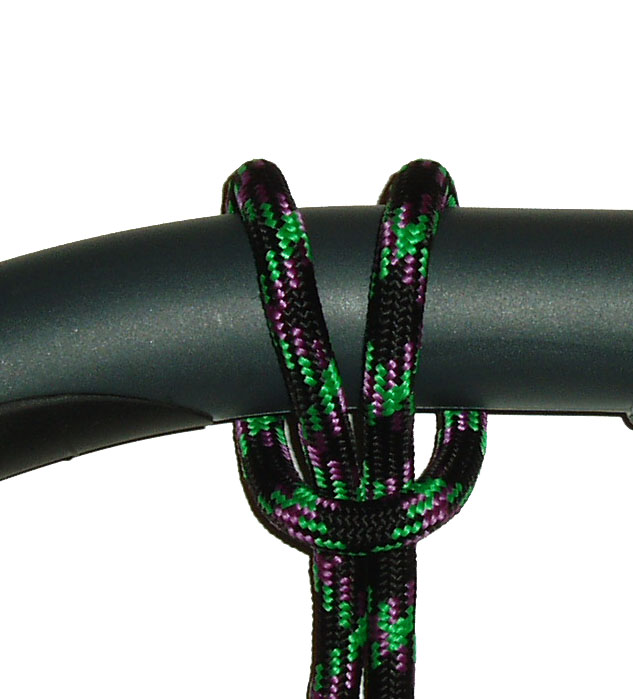
- Names: Girth hitch, Lark's head, Lark's foot, Ring hitch, Lanyard hitch, Bale Sling hitch, Baggage Tag Loop, Tag Knot, Deadeye hitch, Running eye, Strop Bend
- Category: Hitch
- Origin: Ancient
- Related: Clove hitch, Cat's paw, Bale sling hitch, Prusik
- Releasing: Non-jamming
- Typical use: Tying a rope to a ring or pole
- Caveat: Can fail unless equal tension is applied to both of the standing parts of the rope.
- ABoK: #5, #56, #59, #244, #310, #1184, #1673, #1694, #1698, #1700, #1802, #2163, #2164, #2168, #2175, #3317

The cow hitch, also called the lark's head, is a hitch knot used to attach a rope to an object. The cow hitch comprises a pair of single hitches tied in opposing directions, as compared to the clove hitch in which the single hitches are tied in the same direction. It has several variations and is known under a variety of names. It can be tied either with the end of the rope or with a bight.

== History ==
A simple and useful knotted structure, the cow hitch has been known since at least the first century when described by Greek physician Heraklas in a monograph on surgical knots and slings. Known under a variety of names, this knot has been used both on land and at sea. The common alternate name "lark's head" is attributed to Tom Bowling (pseudonym) in the 1866 work The Book of Knots which is presumed to have been adapted from a French manuscript; lark's head is a literal translation of the French name for the knot, tête d'alouette.

== Variations ==
The underlying cow hitch structure can be formed and used in a variety of ways. These variations are differentiated by method used to form the knot and the way in which it is loaded. In particular, the knot can be formed with an end of the rope, in a closed loop or strap, or a combination of these two in which it is tied with the end and then formed into a loop by securing the free end to the standing part. Although certain names tend to be historically associated with a particular variations, real-world naming is not necessarily consistent between various users and applications.

=== With the end ===
When tied using the end of a rope, such as when securing an animal's lead to a vertical post or stake, this knot was said to be more resistant to loosening than the clove hitch as the animal wanders around the post. In general, however, this single-ended form of the cow hitch is less stable compared to the variations in which both ends are loaded.

=== In a closed loop or strap ===
This form is commonly known as a strap hitch or girth hitch, the latter term being common among climbers. It is the method commonly used to attach luggage tags which have a pre-tied loop of string or elastic. This form is also often used to connect loop-ended lanyards to handheld electronic equipment, since it can be tied without access to the ends of the fastening loop.

When used to connect two closed loops, and dressed so as to be symmetrical, it is known as a strop bend. This can be used to attach pre-sewn or permanently tied slings.

=== With the end, then secured into a loop ===
When tied by threading the end and then the end is secured to the standing part, the knot is known as a bale sling hitch.

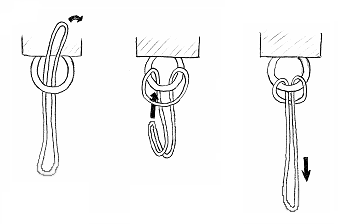
Made with a closed loop

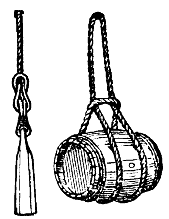
Shown being used to hoist a barrel, and (left) for tying a lead to a sounding line

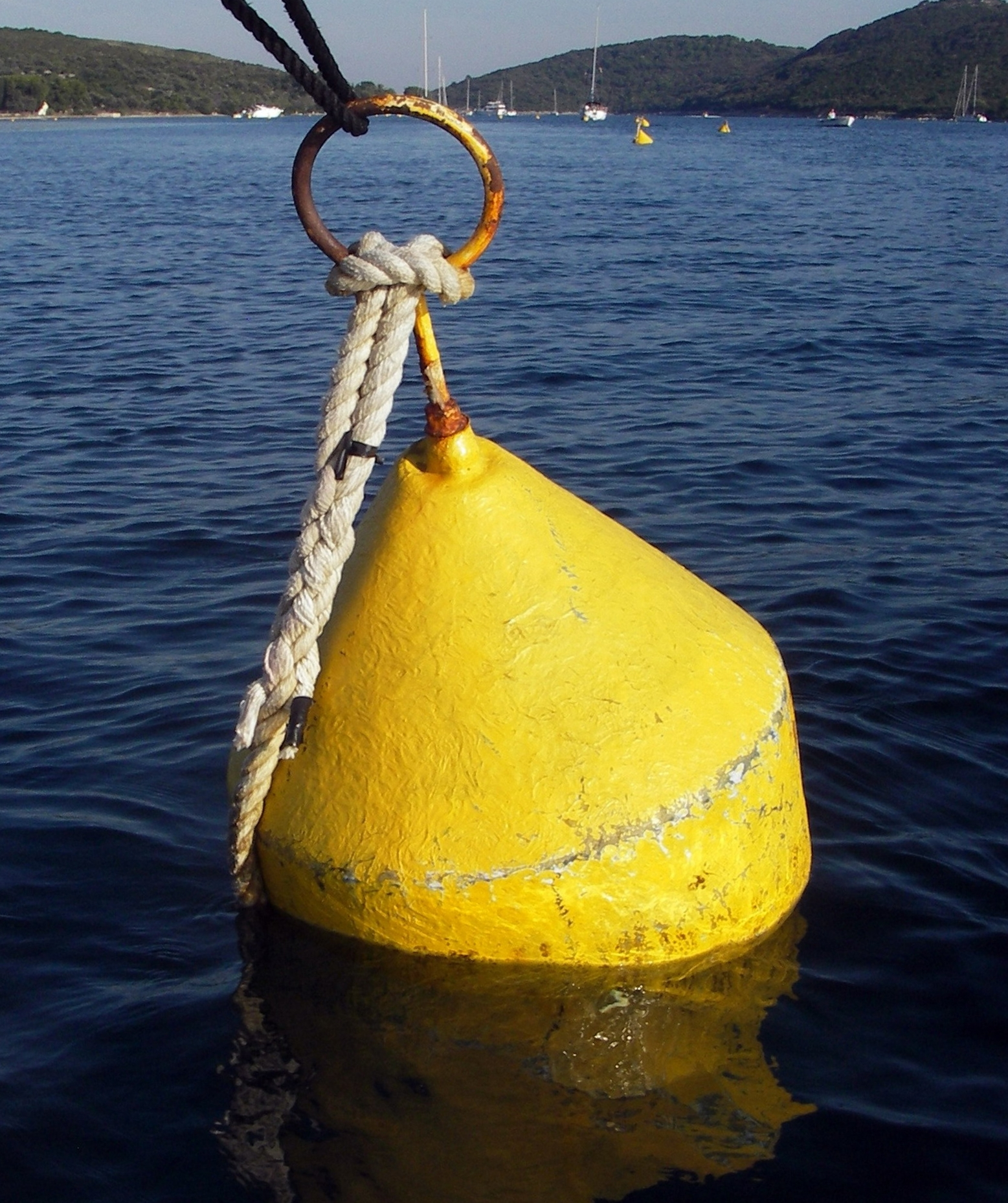
Made with an eye splice around a ring

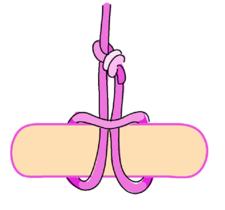
Made with end and then secured to standing part

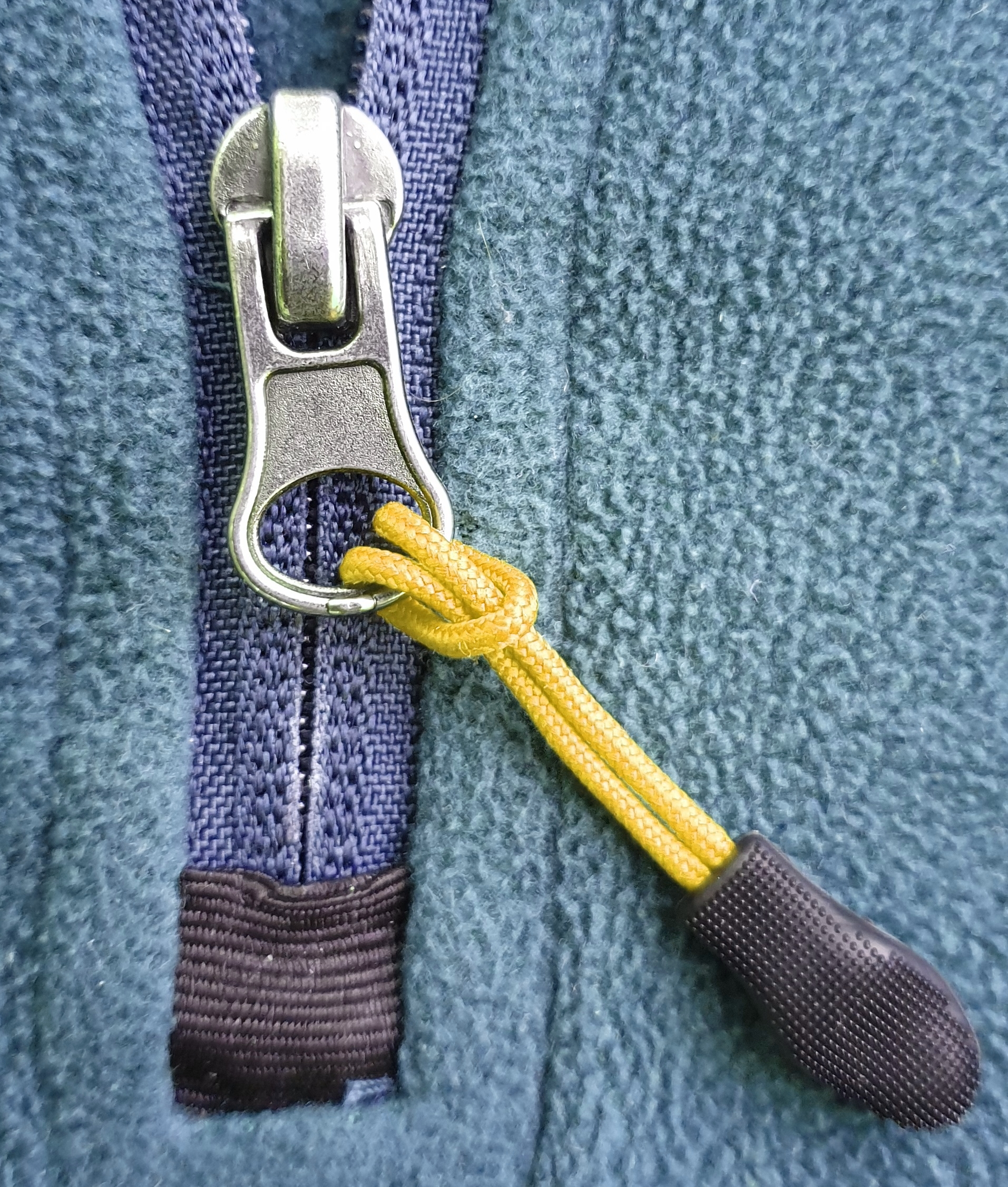
Cow hitch at Zipper

== Applications ==
=== Tatting ===
The craft of tatting is composed primarily of lark's head knots over carrier threads. A lark's head is called a double stitch in tatting.

=== Friendship bracelets ===
In the context of friendship bracelets, the lark's head is called the reverse knot or the forward backward knot or the backward forward knot if the author is being directionally specific for instructional purposes.

=== Cableman's hitch ===
Another application for the cow hitch is in the handling of large electric power cable in surface mines. Known colloquially as a "Cableman's hitch", it is also used to attach loops of cable to the back of a pick-up truck during a shovel move. As the cable can weigh upwards of 22 pounds per foot (33 kg/m) and 3–4 loops of cable can be attached to one length of rope, a clove hitch's shearing force would damage the cable jacket. The Cableman's hitch puts the strain onto the hitch crossing over the two running ends of the rope.

=== Products that use cow hitch knots ===
- The Nintendo Wii Remote, for securing the strap to the Wiimote
- Some mobile phone accessories use this knot to secure themselves to the phones
- Textile/rubber bands attached to zippers are usually tied with the cow hitch, usually to reduce the size of the puller.

== See also ==
- Halter hitch
- Hoxton knot
- List of knots
- Ringbolt hitching
