= Tensionless hitch =

Type of knot

Tensionless Hitch
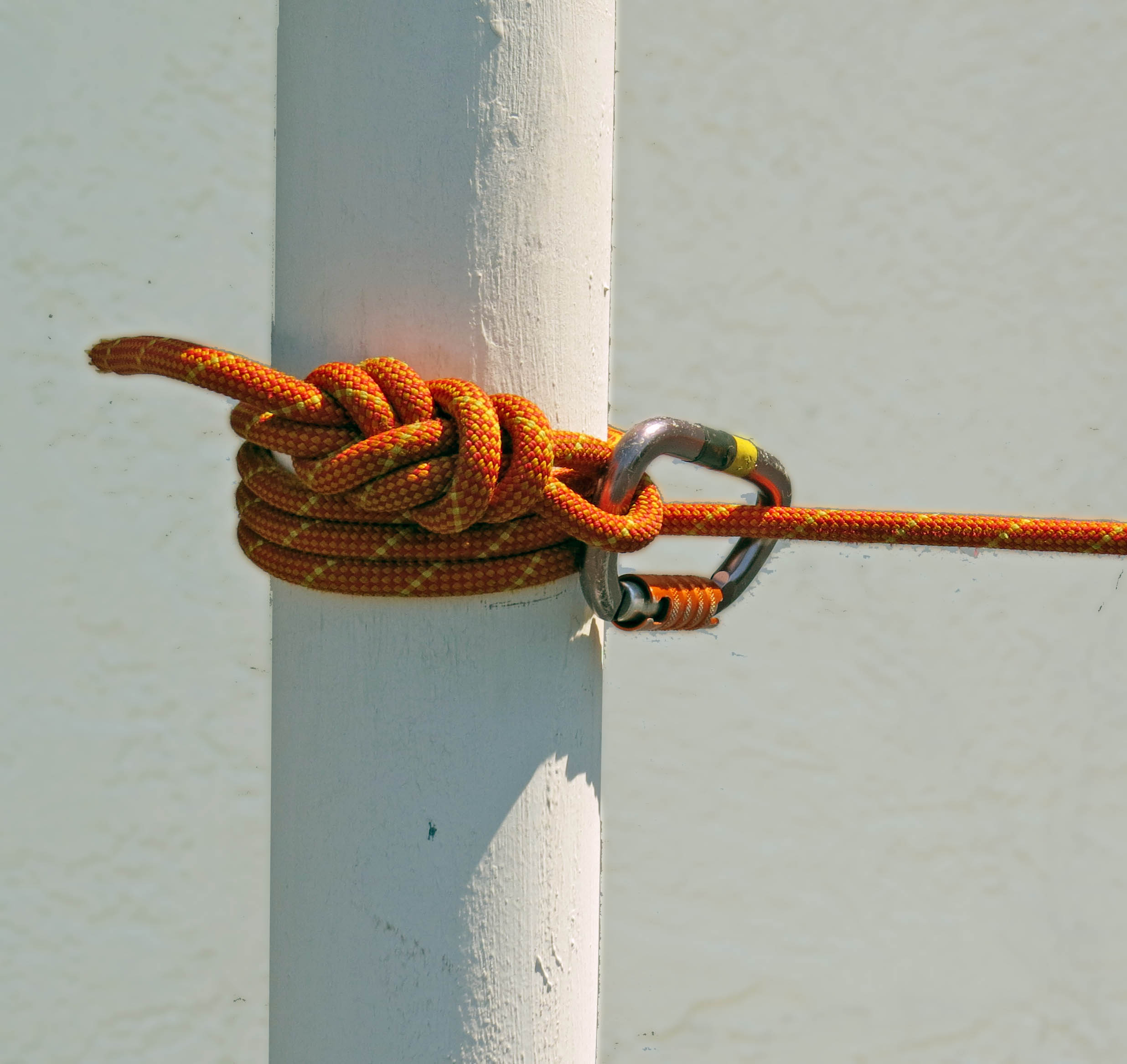
- A tensionless hitch around a post
- Names: Tensionless Hitch, high-strength tie-off, No-Knot
- Category: Hitch
- Efficiency: 100%
- Related: Round turn and two half-hitches, Pipe hitch, Klemheist knot, Tugboat hitch
- Releasing: Non-jamming
- Typical use: anchor knot
- Caveat: The anchor diameter should be at least 8X the rope diameter. Also, the hitch will not stay in place without a load.
- ABoK: 2047

A Tensionless hitch is an anchor knot used for rappelling or rope rescue. Unlike most knots, the tensionless hitch retains a 100% efficiency rating, meaning the strength of the knot is equal to the strength of the rope; it is not a significant stress riser.

== Tying ==
The working end of a rope is prepared by tying a figure-eight loop, and then clipping a carabiner through that loop.

The rope is then wrapped around a smooth pole, pipe, round beam or tree branch which has a diameter greater than the rope. The rope is typically wrapped 3 to 4 times around the anchor, without crossing. Finally, the working end is attached to the standing part with the carabiner.

An overhand knot may be tied around the standing part before the final wrap around the anchor.
