= Swing hitch =

Type of knot

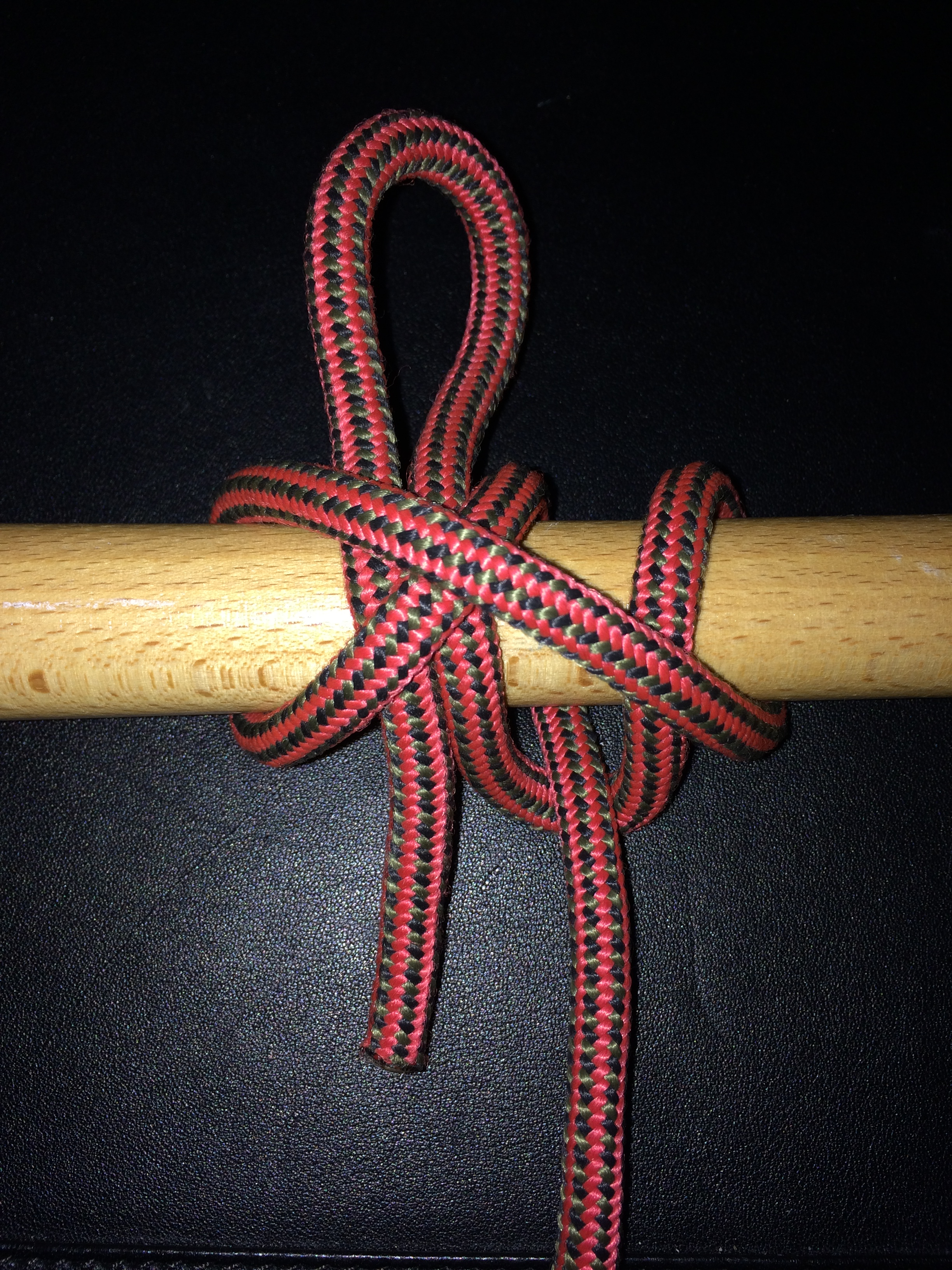
- SWING HITCH
- Names: Swing hitch, Sailor's hitch
- Category: Hitch
- Efficiency: firm, strong, secure says ABOK
- Related: Clove hitch
- Releasing: Easy
- Typical use: swing, weights with pendulum movements
- ABoK: 1693 (unslipped version)

Swing hitch is a way to tie a swing rope to a branch or other horizontal beam. Ashley describes it in ABOK as "... firm, strong, secure, and easily untied once the load has been removed."

This knot serves a similar function to the sailor's hitch.

== Tying ==
1. A clove hitch is tied around the beam with the rope end.
2. The end continues around the beam until it meets the main part.
3. The end goes around the main part and then gets stuck under the first turn of the main part; preferably under the point where main part and the bridge of the clove hitch cross each other.
  - The end may be slipped for easier dismount or
  - The end may be tied to a stopper knot for more security against loosening under use.

If the place of attachment is very slippery, near the end of the beam, tapered with less diameter in the pulling direction, then one may start with more than one turn nearest the main part, effectively tying a Gripping sailor's hitch.

If the swing is to have two parallel ropes, the standing parts both must hang from the same side of the branch, otherwise there will be forces rotating the swing seat right and left. Swing hitch reduces such forces by having the end pull the main part towards the middle of the beam and fixing it there; Using a simple clove hitch would cause more of these disturbing rotational forces.

If the swing is attached to a living tree, protecting the sap carrying live layers of the inner bark may be necessary; Suitable measures of tree protection while attaching a swing include

- Choosing a grabbing and tightly holding knot such as swing hitch rather than a loop knot such as a bowline for the swing, and thus avoiding sawing or sanding type of movements of the rope,
- Using a cambium protector in between rope and tree that is soft towards the tree and slippery on the rope side, so any movement of the rope slide on the protector, and does not wear off the bark.

== See also ==
- List of knots
