= Knotless knot =

Type of hitch knot

- A knotless knot joining a fishing line (blue) to a fishing hook (grey) and a hair rig (orange)
- Category: Hitch
- Related: Snell knot
- Typical use: Angling

The knotless knot is a hitch knot used to attach an eyed fishing hook to fishing line while leaving a length of line hanging below the hook. The extra length of line can then be used as the hair of a hair rig.

== Description ==
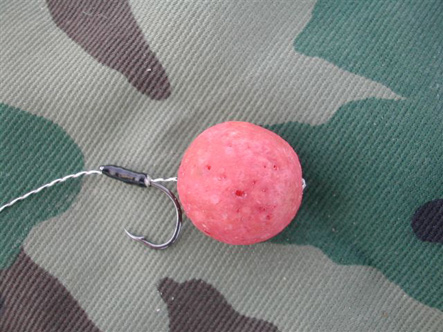
Knot in use

The knotless knot is usually tied to a leader, rather than directly to the main line. The far end of the leader may already be baited or looped in preparation for bait, because the knot will be tied using the near end as the working end.

The working end is passed through the hook eye from back to front (towards the hook point), wrapped tightly around itself and the hook shaft several times (down from the eye towards the bend of the hook), and finally passed once more through the eye back to front.
