= Sailor's hitch =

Type of knot

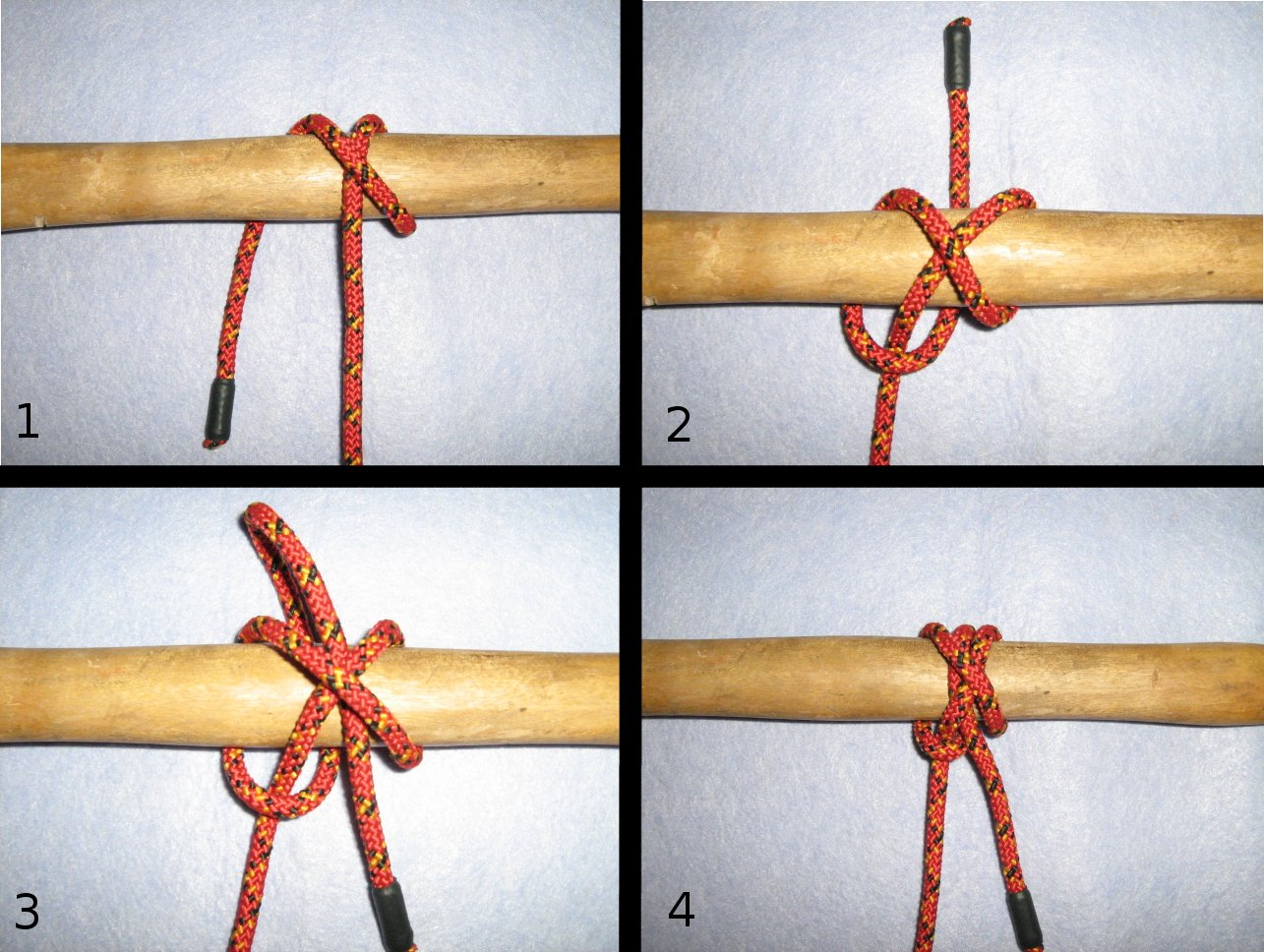
- Category: Hitch
- Releasing: Non-jamming

The sailor's hitch is a secure, jam-proof hitch knot. A hitch knot is a type of knot that has the ability to fit to the size and shape of an object that it is being tied to.

The sailor's hitch is similar in function and appearance to the swing hitch.

The sailor's hitch can be used in such a way that allows a smaller rope to be attached to a large rope. The smaller rope should be pulled to the left while the bight should go through the final tuck to form the final product of a sailor's hitch.

This knot can also serve the purpose of a cleat hitch.

There is another variation of the knot with several more turns that is called the gripping sailor's hitch. The gripping sailor's hitch is commonly confused with the icicle hitch, but it has distinctions with the last tuck of the knot that allows them to be different.

The sailor's knot is used in the following circumstances:

- search and rescue
- mountaineering
- climbing
- boating
- horse and livestock
- camping
- scouting

== See also ==
- List of knots
- Sailor's knot
- Gripping sailor's hitch
- List of friction hitch knots
