= Anchor bend =

Knot used for attaching a rope to a ring

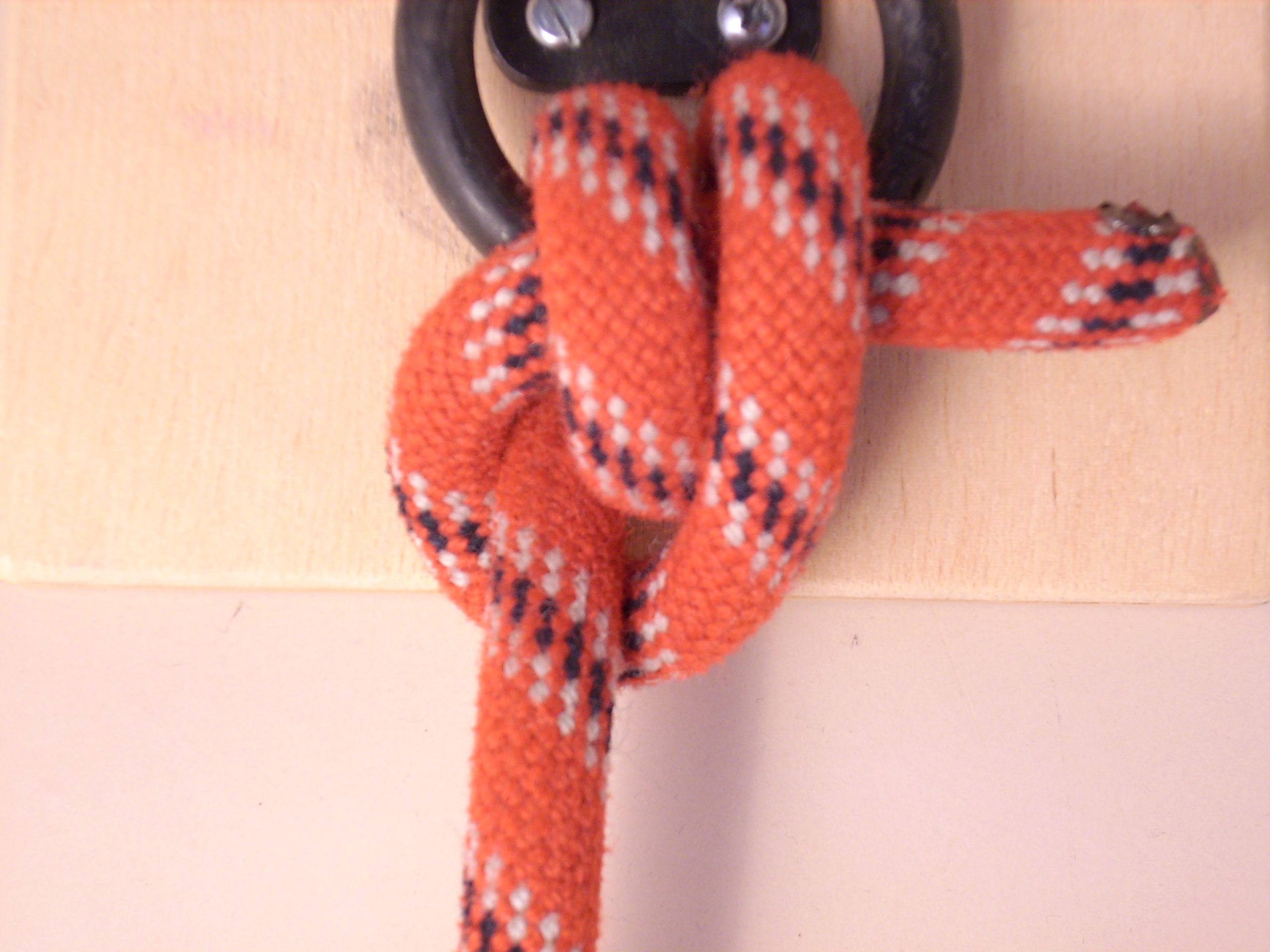
- Names: Anchor bend, fisherman's bend
- Category: Hitch
- Related: Round turn and two half hitches
- Releasing: Jamming
- Typical use: attaching a rope to a ring or similar termination
- ABoK: #24, #1518, #1722 – #1724, #1840 – #1842

The anchor bend is a knot used for attaching a rope to a ring or similar termination. The name is a misnomer, as it is technically not a bend, but a hitch.

== Origins ==
"oncear bendum," an early evidence of use of anchor bends by Anglo-Saxons from Beowulf

Its name originates from the time when "bend" was understood to simply mean "tie to"; today, a bend strictly refers to a knot that joins two lines.

== Techniques ==
While the knot can become jammed in some modern materials, it is usually easily untied after moderate loads; it can be made more resistant to jamming by taking an extra turn around the object—this will make for a one-diameter longer span of the end to reach around the standing part to be tucked (although in a case of tying to a small shackle or link of a chain, this might not be possible). It is the accepted knot for attaching anchors (or more usually anchor chains) to warps. The knot is very similar to a round turn and two half hitches except that the first half hitch is passed under the turn. In many everyday uses, the finishing half-hitch need not be made; alternatively, one might seek surer security by tying off the end with a strangle knot to the standing part.

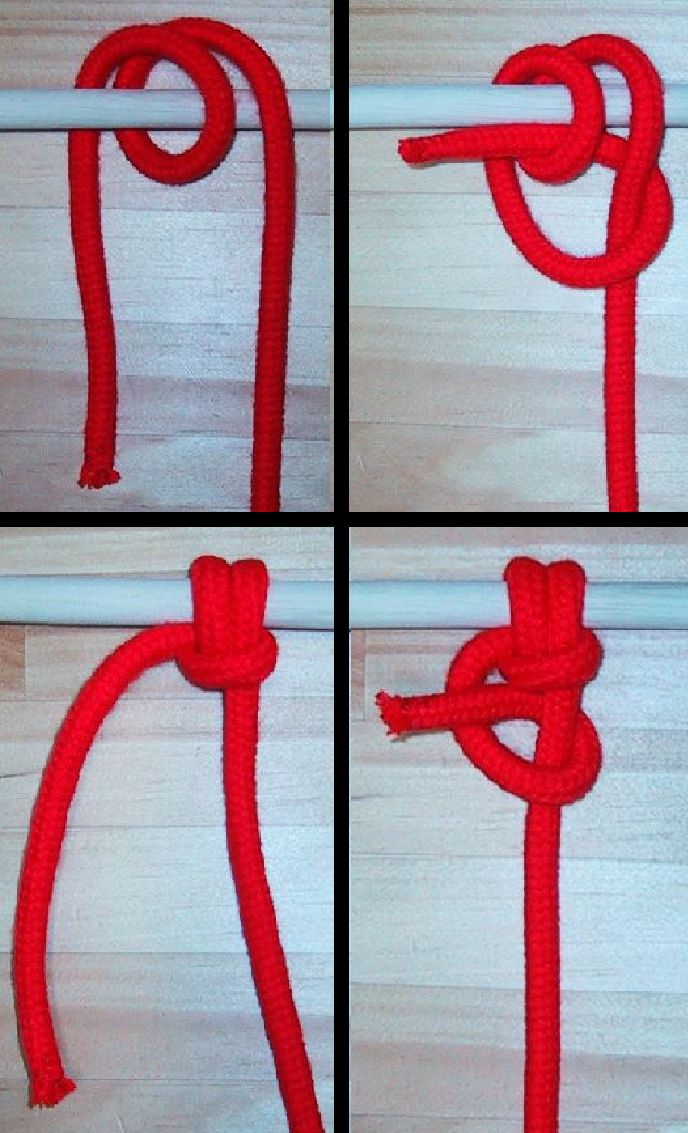
Anchor bend step by step, with a finishing half hitch.

== See also ==
- Round turn and two half-hitches
- List of knots
- List of hitch knots
