= San Diego Jam knot =

Fishing knot

The San Diego jam knot is a common fishing knot used to tie a line to the hook, swivel, clip, or artificial fly. This knot is also known as the San Diego knot, reverse clinch knot or Heiliger knot.

This is a common knot used by fishermen because it is simple to tie, is strong and can be used with many kinds of line including mono-filament, fluorocarbon, and braided fishing line. It is an alternative to another fishing knot, the clinch knot.

== Description ==
The San Diego jam knot is intended to be tied to a ring or a hook with an eye on the back end. It is tied by first passing the main line through the eye, and then doubling the free end back over the main line. Next the fisherman wraps the free end around the doubled main line five times (more turns may be recommended for light line or fewer for heavy line) working towards the eye. The free end is then passed through the loop that has formed at the eye, and subsequently through the loop around the main line that was formed by the first wrap. The dampened main line and free end are pulled to snug the knot tight. A variation tied using line that is doubled prior to passing it through the eye is known as the doubled San Diego jam knot.

== History ==
This knot is thought to have originated as a quick and reliable way to tie the heavy “iron” jigs by fishermen chasing tuna on long-range boats, such as those that fished in Mexican waters.

== See also ==
- List of knots
