= Uni knot =

Fishing knot

Uni Knot
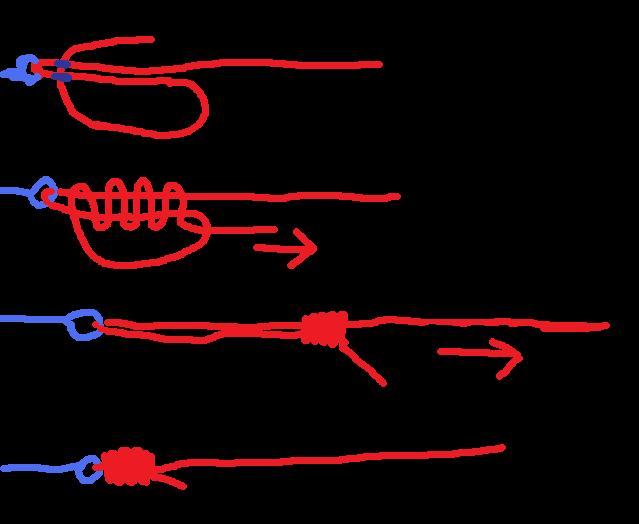
- Names: Uni Knot, Gallows knot, Duncan Loop.
- Category: Hitch
- Category 2: Bend
- Related: Double overhand noose
- Typical use: Fishing
- ABoK: #1121

The uni knot is a multi-purpose fishing knot used in angling that can be used for attaching the fishing line to the spool of a reel, for joining main line to leader/backing lines, and for attaching lures, swivels and snaps. When tied correctly, the Uni Knot retains 80% of the line’s breaking strength when used to attach hooks or lures, and about 70% when joining lines.

== History ==
The knot, shown with three passes, was published in 1944 under the name gallows knot (#1121) in The Ashley Book of Knots. Ashley notes that it is actually an alternate arrangement of the multiple overhand noose. His diagram shows how the knot can be manipulated into the more familiar form.

This knot is also called the Duncan loop, after Norman Duncan who developed it independently as a fishing knot in the early 1960s. The knot was popularized as the uni knot by Vic Dunaway, an editor at the Miami Herald, in a 1970 fishing book.

Currently, in American English the knot is known as the uni knot referring to its ability to work with mono-filament or fluorocarbon fishing lines. However, in British English it is commonly known as the Grinner knot.

The uni knot is used by popular television host Jeremy Wade, on the Animal Planet TV series River Monsters.

== Use ==
The uni knot is widely used for attaching hooks, rings and swivels to the end of the line and it is also used for joining two fishing lines together. The bend form of the uni knot (for joining two lines) is not a noose; rather it is akin to a multiple fisherman's knot with the two opposing knotted parts arranged in the manner of uni knots.

The uni knot retains much of the fishing line breaking strength and the uni knot works well with monofilament, fluorocarbon and braided fishing lines.

== See also ==
- List of knots
