= Highwayman's hitch =

Quick-release draw loop knot

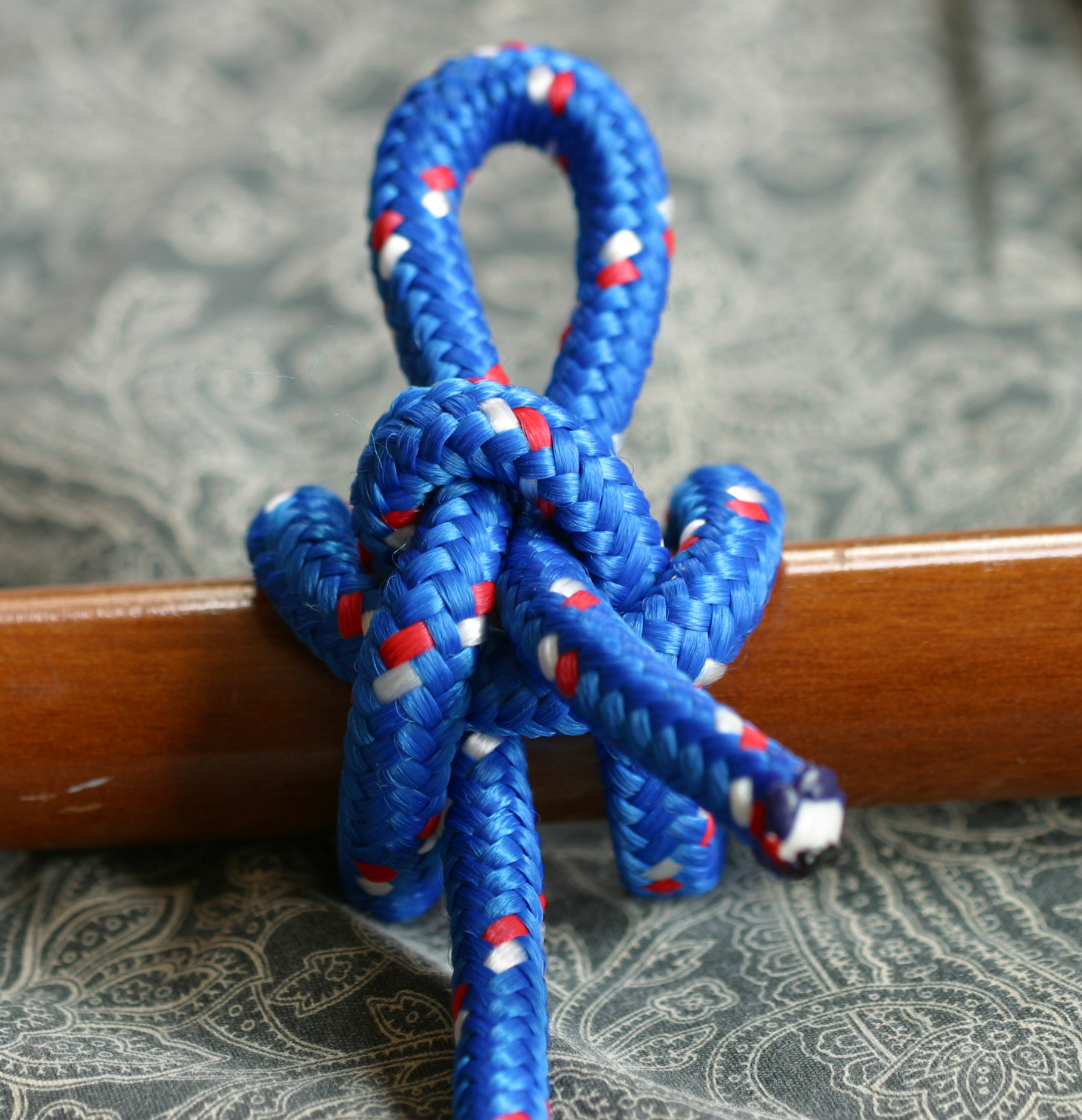
- A Highwayman's hitch tied around a wooden pole
- Names: Highwayman's hitch, Highwayman's hitch, draw hitch, Highwayman’s cutaway, Bank Robbers Knot, Getaway hitch or Quick-release knot
- Category: Hitch
- Related: Tumble hitch, Mooring Hitch
- Releasing: Non-jamming
- Typical use: Quick-release, draw loop hitch
- Caveat: Potentially unstable, especially when tied around large objects

The Highwayman’s hitch is a quick-release draw hitch used for temporarily securing a load that will need to be released easily and cleanly --i.e, that will come completely free of the hitched object. The hitch can be untied with a tug of the working end, even when under tension. The highwayman's hitch can be tied in the middle of a rope, and so the working end does not need to be passed around the anchor when tying or releasing.

== History ==
The hitch was called the highwayman's cutaway in 1947 by Cyrus L. Day. He related that, according to Hal McKail, the knot was attributable to the notorious 18th-century English highwayman Dick Turpin. Day's book, however, suggested it for use as a quick-release mooring hitch for solo sailing.

While the knot is alleged to have actually been used by highwaymen, this claim is rejected by knot expert Geoffrey Budworth, who stated, "there is no evidence to substantiate the reputation of the highwayman's hitch as a quick-getaway-knot for robbers on horseback."

== Tying ==
The knot is three bights that each successively lock the previous one:

1. the first one, in the middle of the rope, wraps around the pole,
2. the second one (called the toggle bight) is a bight of the standing part locking the first one so the pole is held tight, and
3. the third one (called the slip-tuck) is a bight of the working part (slack end) locking the second bight.

The locking actions are achieved by reaching through each bight to pull the next one through.

The knot has to be finished by pulling the standing part tight to ensure that it holds.

== Weakness ==
Until the knot is tightened and properly dressed, the highwayman's hitch has little holding power. The highwayman's hitch is susceptible to capsizing when the pole is substantially larger than the rope diameter. The failure occurs because the second bight sees the force of the standing part, but is held in place by the working part, which has no tension. When capsizing, tension on the standing part pulls the second bight through the first bight. This drags the slip-tuck through, and will release the hitch if the third bight isn't long enough.

Alternatives to the highwayman's hitch have been devised to mitigate collapse when tied around large objects.

== Alternatives ==
One simple improvement is to repeat the second and third bights i.e. one more bight of the standing part and then one more bight of the working part, each successively locking the previous bight; this has the disadvantage of requiring longer rope from both parts.

Another technique is to twist each bight before reaching through it for the next locking bight; the disadvantage here is the difficulty of tightening afterwards.

In his book Outdoor Knots, Clyde Soles presents one of Dan Lehman's revisions to the highwayman's hitch that is simple and effective, naming it the "slip-free hitch" (actually, this name denotes all such hitches). One simply rearranges the trio of bights so that the heavily loaded bight in the standing part will surround, rather than go through, the next-made bight; the finishing slipped-tuck bight will thus go through the 2nd-made bight, and so be less severely loaded. As the frame against which this rope toggle is nipped is entirely parts of the knot (and not depending upon proximity to the hitched object), this revision avoids the capsizing vulnerability of the highwayman's hitch.

The Notable Knot Index recommends the tumble hitch as a more stable hitch. It's a similar hitch, but less prone to capsizing because the main part remains passive and the locking is done by two successive bights of the working part (no end needed) wrapping around both the standing part and the post/pole before locking the previous bight.

== See also ==
- List of knots
