= Boom hitch =

Type of knot

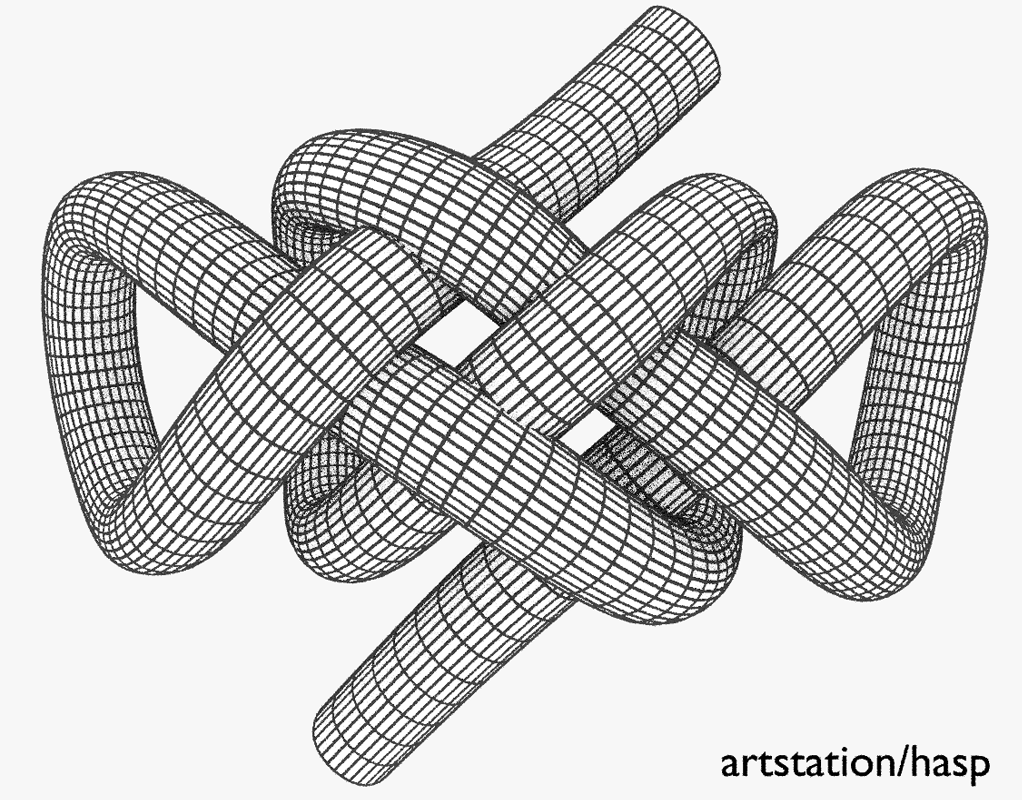
- Category: Hitch
- Efficiency: high
- Origin: Described by Ashley in 1944
- Typical use: robust attachment to a foundation
- ABoK: #1687

The boom hitch is a type of knot. It is a rather robust and secure method of attaching a line, or rope to a fixed object like a pipe, post, or sail boom.

It can be finished with a slip, that is, a bight tucked under rather than the whole line pulled through in the last step. This will make it easier to untie.

The slack must be worked out of all the loops around the foundation. One way is to vigorously wiggle and tug on both ends at the same time. The hitch should not spread out along the foundation, keep the passes around the foundation bunched together snugly. Once tight, this hitch is resistant to sliding along the foundation even if the surface is smooth such as on a steel pipe.

== See also ==
- List of knots
