= Pipe hitch =

Type of knot

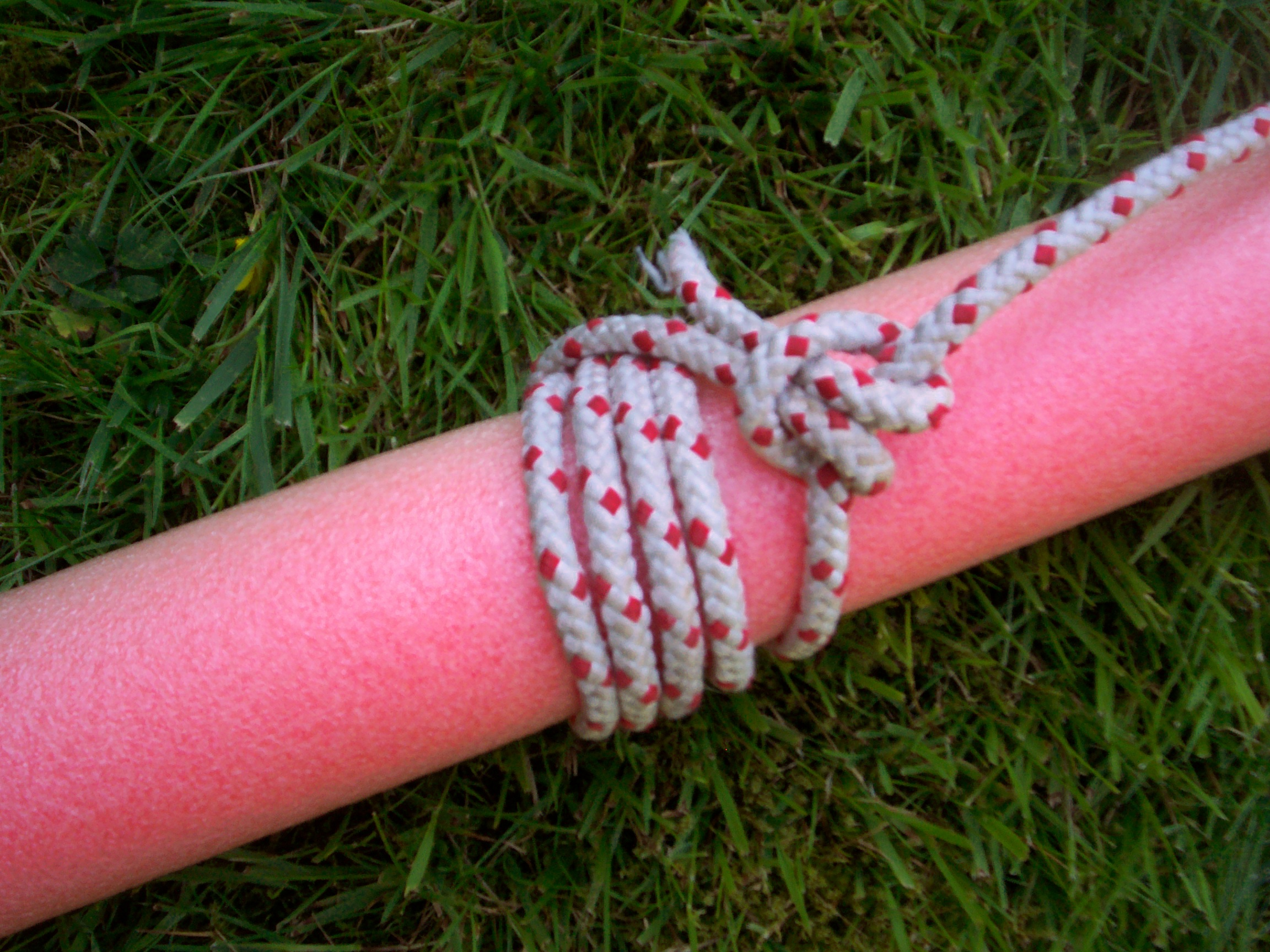
- A pipe hitch, finished with a cow hitch
- Names: Pipe hitch, Well-pipe hitch
- Category: Hitch
- Related: rolling hitch, klemheist knot, Tensionless hitch, Taut-line hitch
- Releasing: Non-jamming
- Typical use: securing a pipe or pole
- Caveat: The direction of the pulling force should be away from the wrapped coils.
- ABoK: 504, 2047

A pipe hitch is a hitch-type knot used to secure smooth cylindrical objects, such as pipes, poles, beams, or spars. According to The Ashley Book of Knots, a pipe hitch is "used to lower a pipe or hoist one" and as "another method of tying to a rectangular timber."

== Information ==
The pipe hitch will not slip when tied correctly to a pipe or pole. This knot is a variation of the Round turn and two half-hitches. This knot can be used with a rope to pull a pipe or spar out of the ground, or to hoist a pipe or beam.

== Instructions ==
The pipe hitch is started by wrapping four or more coils around a pipe or pole. It is finished by tying the working end around the standing part with a clove hitch, and less commonly with a cow hitch or a buntline hitch.

== See also ==
- List of knots
