= Tumble hitch =

Type of hitch knot

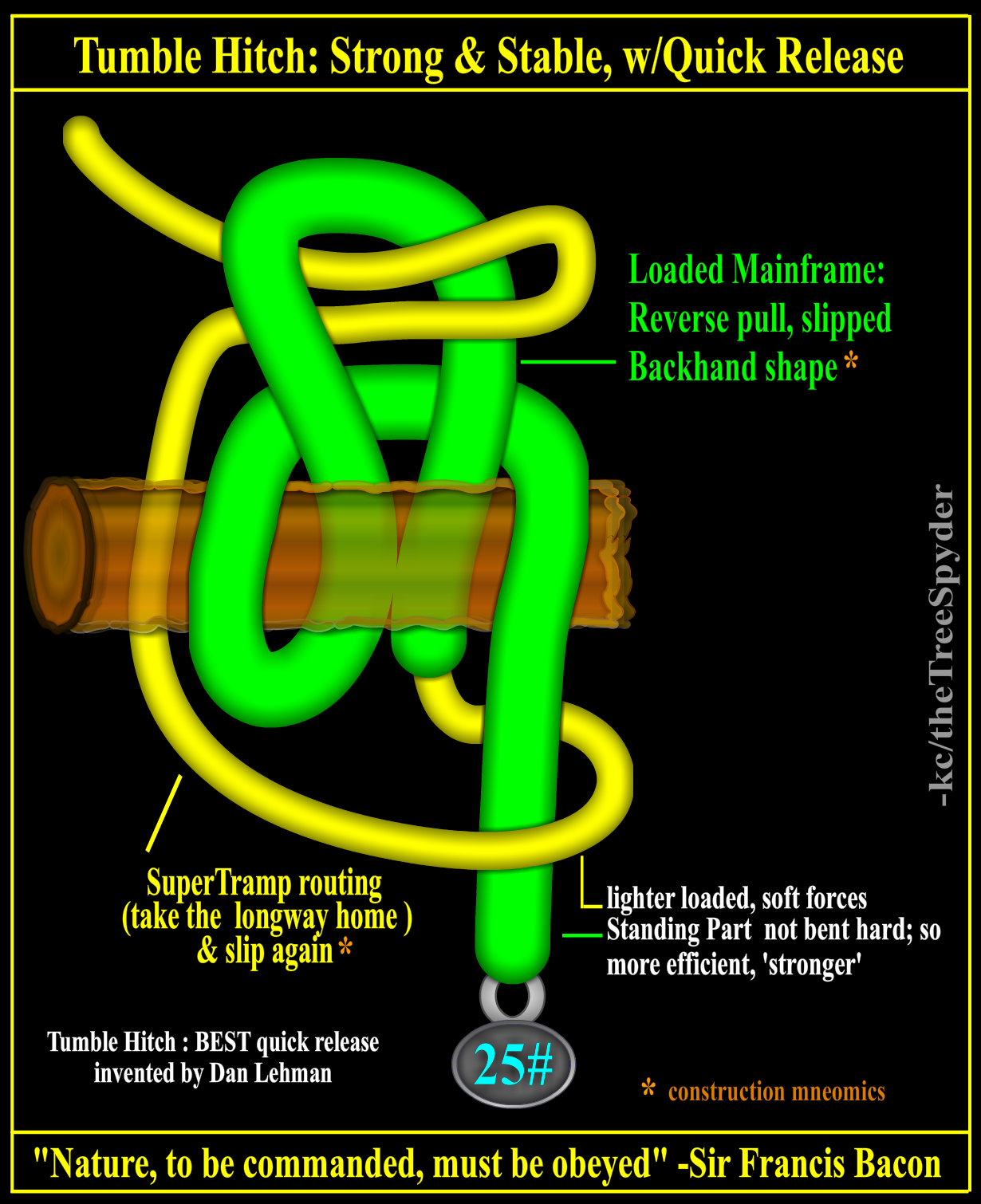
- Very clean release and very little distortion of the main load bearing
- Names: Tumble hitch, a better Highwayman's hitch, Bank Robbers Knot, Getaway hitch, Quick-release knot
- Category: Hitch
- Related: Highwayman's hitch, Mooring hitch
- Releasing: Non-jamming
- Typical use: Quick-release, draw loop hitch
- Caveat: potentially unstable

The tumble hitch is a "slip-free", quick-release hitch knot used for temporarily securing a rope such that it can be released easily to be completely free of the hitched-to object (instead of parts still being wrapped around it). The hitch might be able to be released with a tug of the working end, even when under tension; but the workings depend upon materials and forces; note that in some cases, "under tension" will amount to simply being tied and the line itself giving significant tension by weight. The tumble hitch is tied in the bight.

Usually two locking turns (as in the picture here) suffice for a knot secure enough for most purposes, but another could be added for further stability. The general knotting principles evident in this and the well-published "highwayman's hitch" can be implemented in a variety of ways. This knot was designed specifically to avoid the problem of the highwayman's hitch of putting the full force of loading upon the locking toggle ("slip") bight, which esp. in soft cordage can collapse that and pull it through the bight "frame" it had locked against! Hence, The Notable Knot Index recommends the tumble hitch as a more stable hitch than the highwayman's hitch.

== Tying ==
Assuming hitching to a high horizontal beam:

1. A bight is placed over the beam with both the standing part and the working end hanging down.
2. A second bight of the working end is passed behind the beam, and up through the first bight.
3. A third bight of the working end is passed in front of the standing part, then back and up through the second bight. This third bight should be sufficiently long, since pulling the standing end from various directions may pull some of it through the knot.
4. Optionally the previous step can be repeated for increased security, especially if tied around bigger objects. The resulting knot has been called Somersault Hitch.

The standing part just hangs from the first and only bight in front of the beam. All other bights are behind the beam and through the previous bight.

Untying is done by pulling the working end until all bights are released from inside the previous bight and the rope leaves the beam.

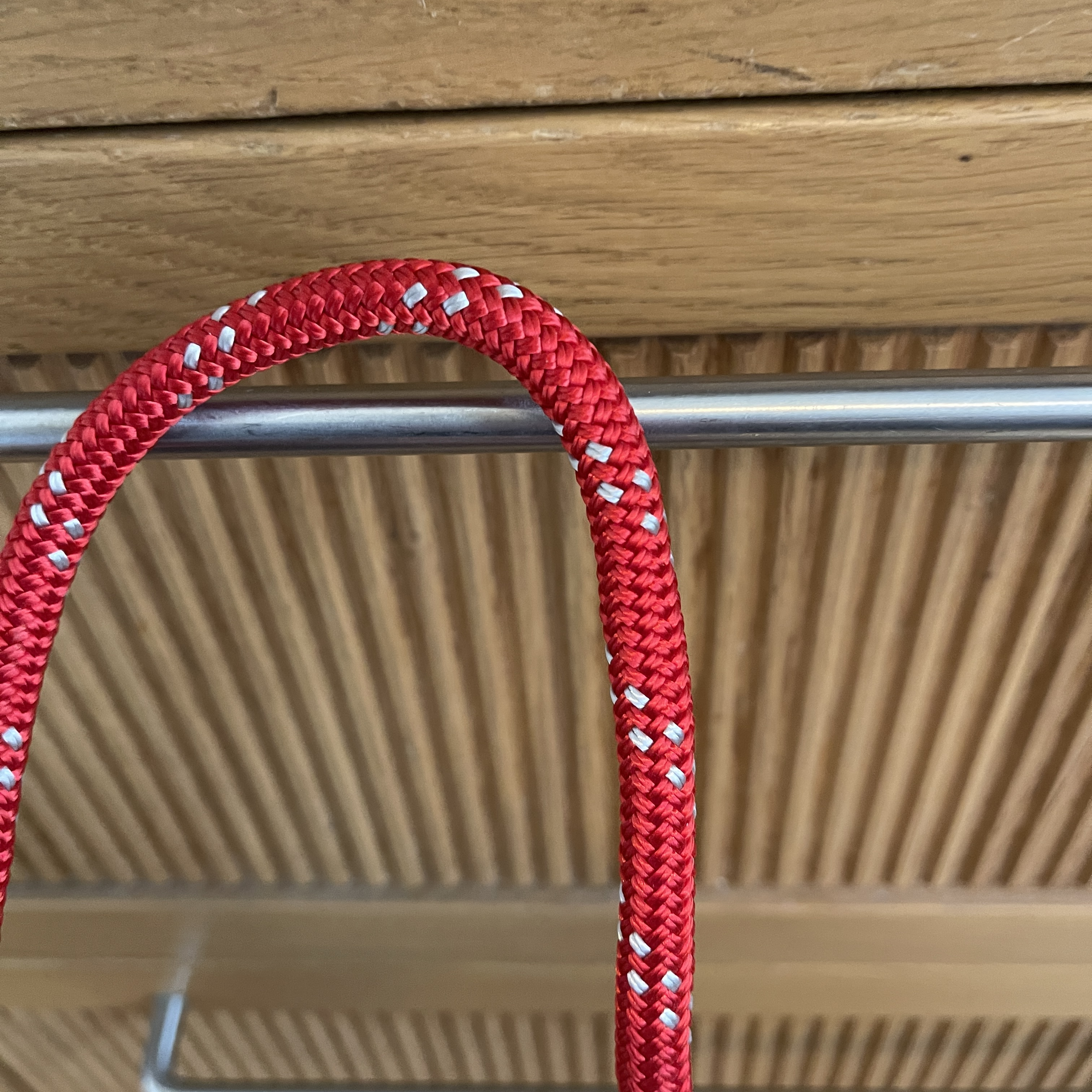
a first bight over the beam.

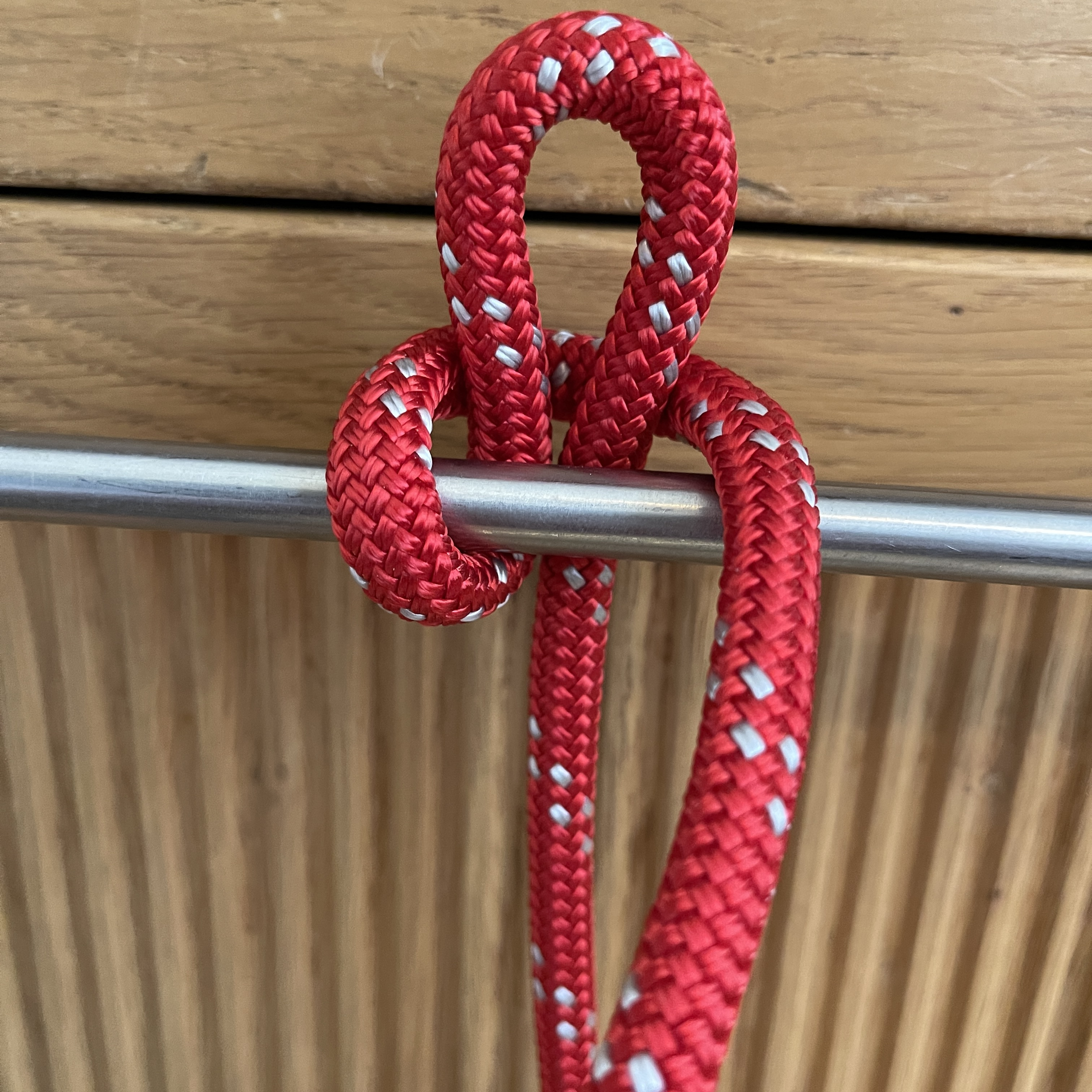
bight of working end up behind and up through the bight.

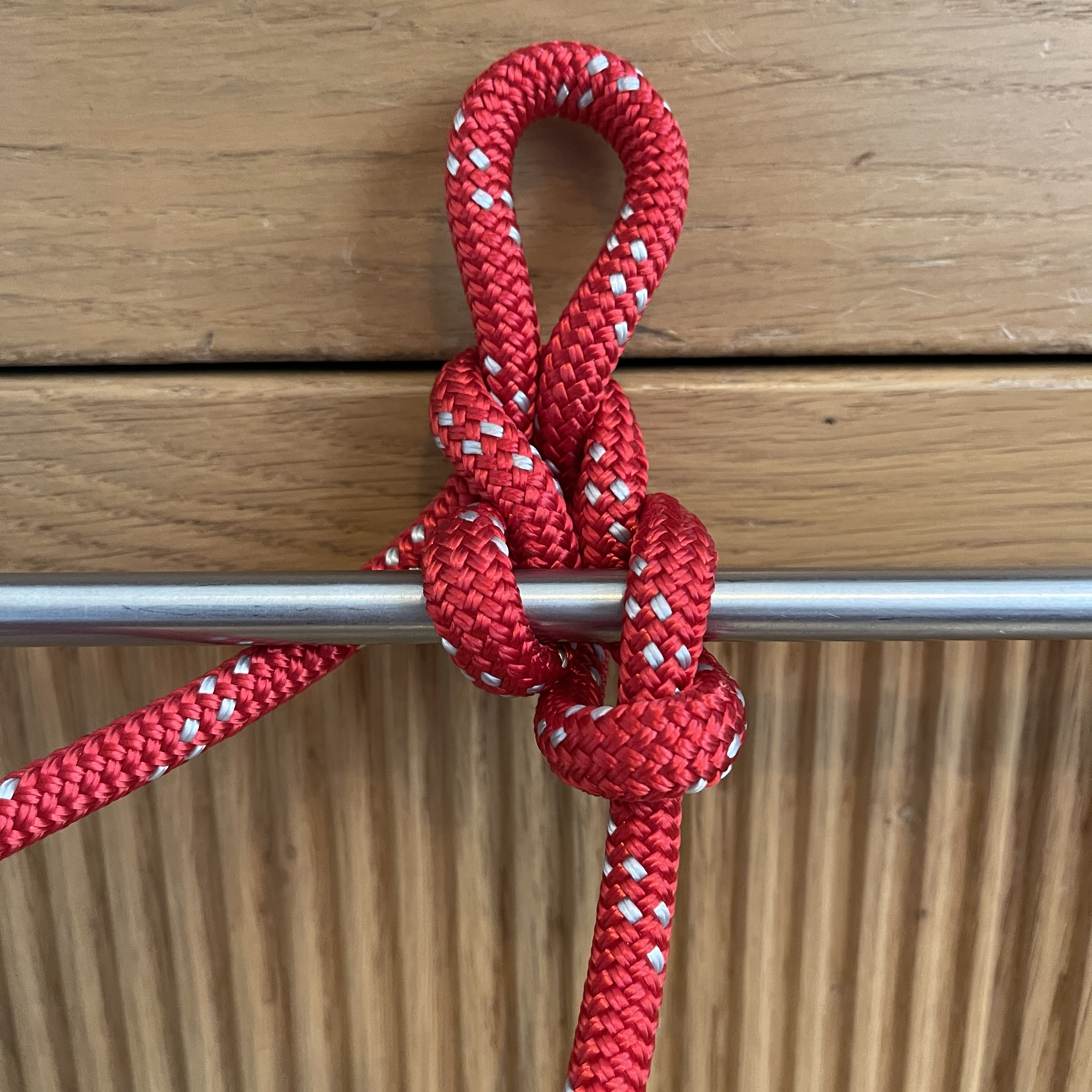
then around the standing part and up through the last bight.

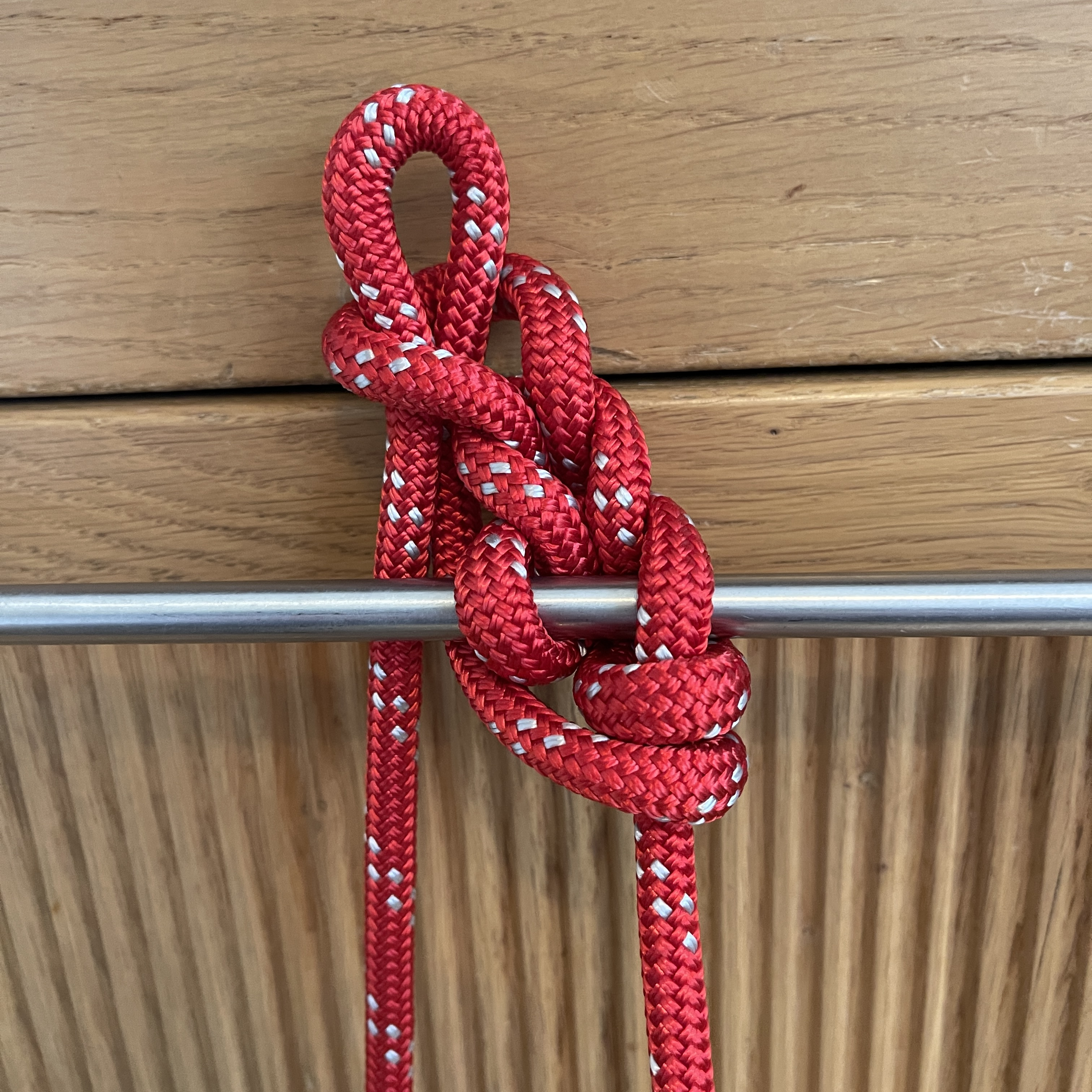
repeat step 3 for more stability.

== See also ==
- List of knots
