= Garda hitch =

Type of climbing knot

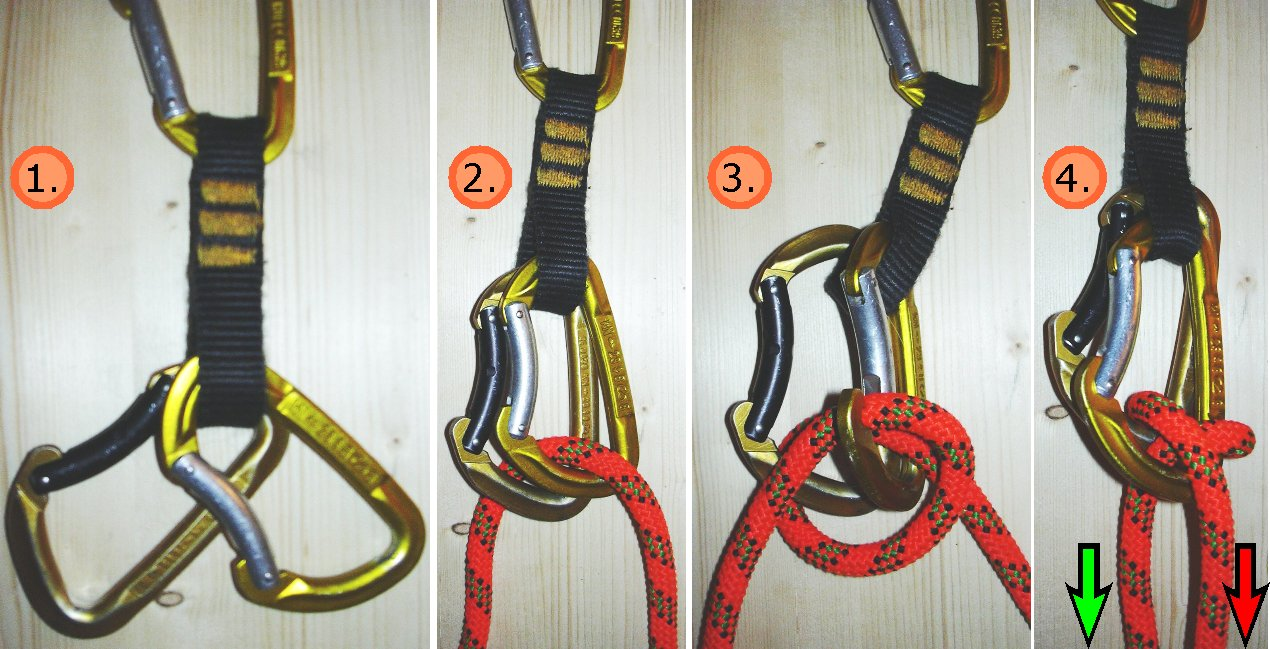
- Category: Hitch
- Related: Italian/Munter hitch
- Typical use: Rock climbing, Mountaineering

The Garda Hitch, also known as the Alpine Clutch, is a type of climbing knot that can only be moved in one direction. It is often used in climbing and mountaineering, such as in pulley systems to haul loads up a cliff. However, the Garda Hitch has some drawbacks, including being difficult to release under load, difficult to inspect, and adding significant friction to a pulley system. It can be challenging to determine which direction the rope will move freely and which direction it will lock just by looking at it. To tie a Garda Hitch, you need two similar carabiners, and it works best with two identical oval carabiners. While "D" carabiners can also be used, there is a risk of them unclipping.

== Tying method ==
Attach the two oval carabiners to a sling or cord with both of their gates facing up and out in the same direction. To use the Garda Hitch with "D" carabiners, attach them to a sling or cord so that they are side by side with the gates facing downward and outward in the same direction. Then, clip the rope through both gates and loop the right side of the rope through the left carabiner. This will create a simple twist around the two carabiners. By pulling on the rope ends, you can see that the hitch locks in one direction but moves freely in the other. It takes some practice to determine which end of the rope will move freely when pulled; this is the end that comes out between the carabiners, "spreading" them apart. The other end will pull the carabiners together, squeezing the rope between them and locking it in place.

== See also ==
- List of knots
- List of hitch knots
