= Snell knot =

Hitch knot used in angling

- Category: Hitch
- Related: Knotless knot
- Typical use: Angling

The snell knot is a hitch knot used in angling to attach a fishing line to the shank (instead of the eye) of a fishing hook. The line may still pass through the eye of the hook, but primarily fastens to the shaft. Hooks tied with a snell knot provide an even, straight-line pull to the fish. It is a very secure knot, but because it is easily tied using only the near end as the working end, it is used to attach a hook only to a leader, rather than directly to the main line.

Hooks can be bought pre-snelled.

A snell knot egg hooker is used to hold a cluster of eggs or equivalent bait.
