= Blackwall hitch =

Type of hitch knot

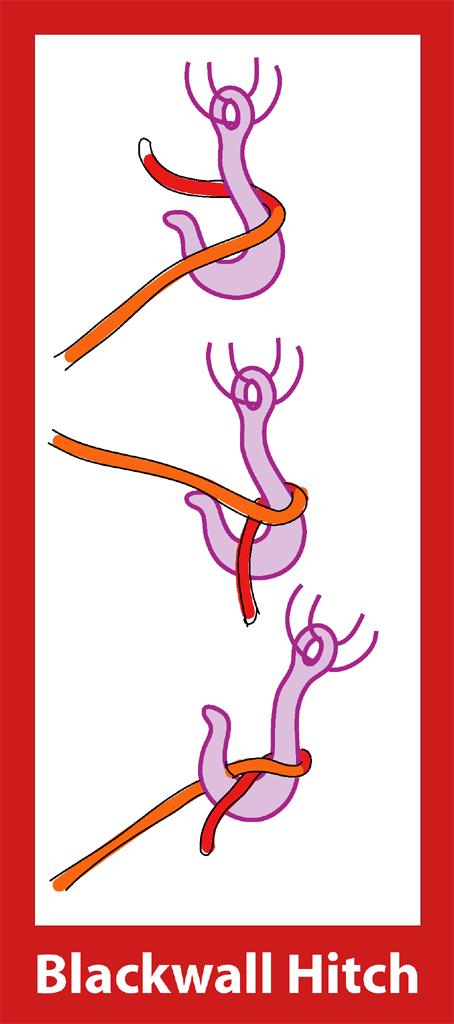
- Category: Hitch
- Related: Half hitch
- Releasing: Non-jamming
- Typical use: To temporarily attach a rope to a hook when they both are of equal size.
- Caveat: Likely to slip if subjected to more than ordinary strain
- ABoK: #1875

The blackwall hitch is a temporary means of attaching a rope to a hook. Made of a simple half hitch over the hook, it will only hold when subjected to constant tension. It is used when the rope and hook are of equal size, but it is likely to slip if subjected to more than ordinary tension. Human life should never be trusted to it.

== See also ==
- List of knots
