= Tugboat hitch =

Type of knot

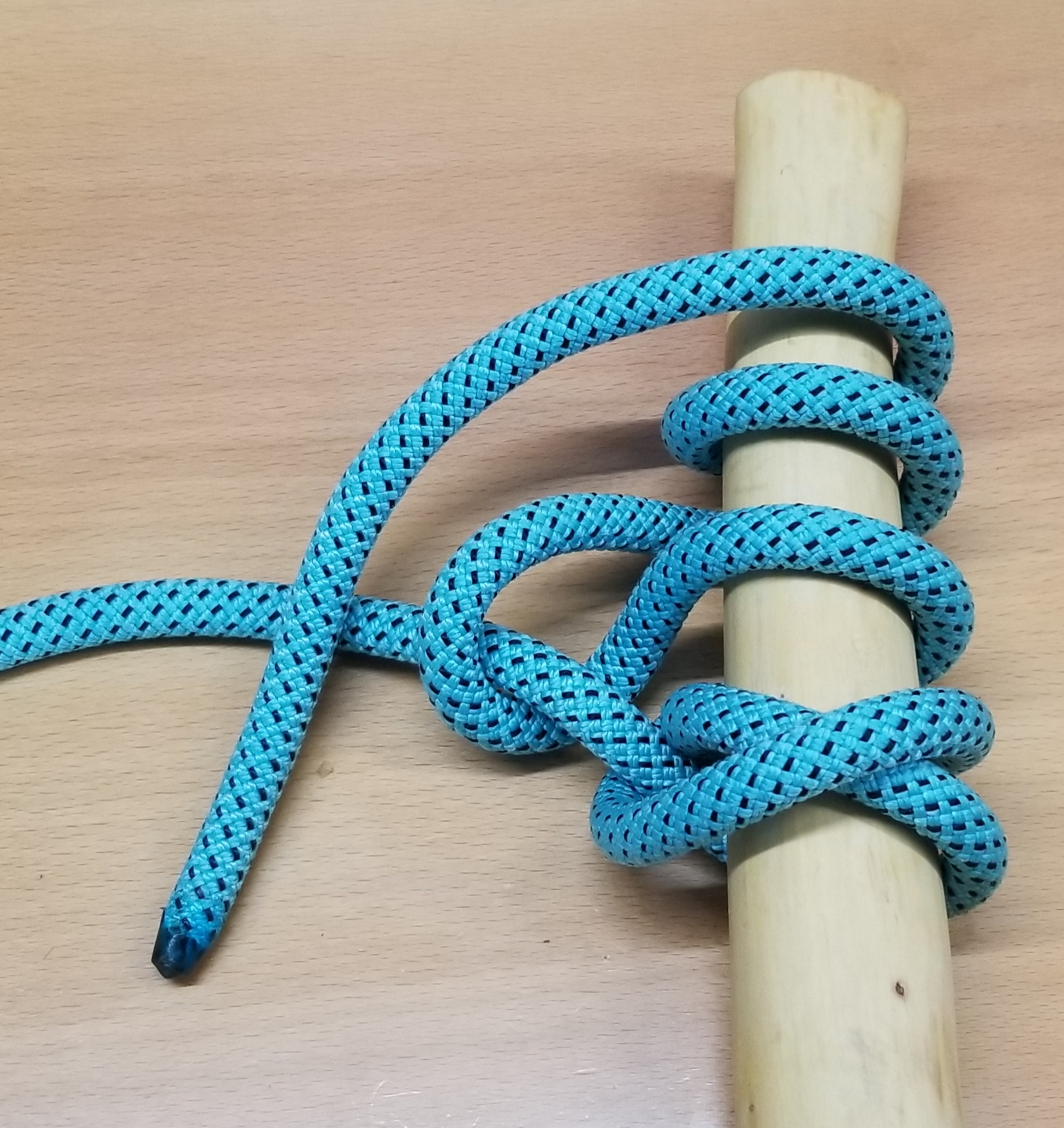
- Names: Tugboat hitch, Lighterman's Hitch; Backhanded Mooring Hitch
- Category: Hitch
- Releasing: Non-jamming, releasable under load
- Typical use: Heavy towing; mooring; securing to a winch
- ABoK: #1795

The Tugboat hitch, also called a Backhanded mooring hitch or Lighterman's Hitch, is a knot ideal for heavy towing, or securing a craft to a post, bollard, or winch. It is easy to release, even under great load.

== Tying ==
To tie, take a single turn or a round turn around the post. Pass a bight under the standing part, then drop the bight over the top of the post. Then make a bight in the rope on the other side of the standing part and drop it over the post. Note that in each placement of a bight over the post, the end's side of the bight should lead to the side away from the standing part—this will make casting off easier. Continue this repetition as necessary until secure (usually three bights). Finish by half-hitching a bight around the standing part or a round turn about the post. With heavy loads, it is important to have made enough bights and turns to reduce force on the final turns or a hitch—otherwise, it will be difficult to untie (a hitch) or may slip.

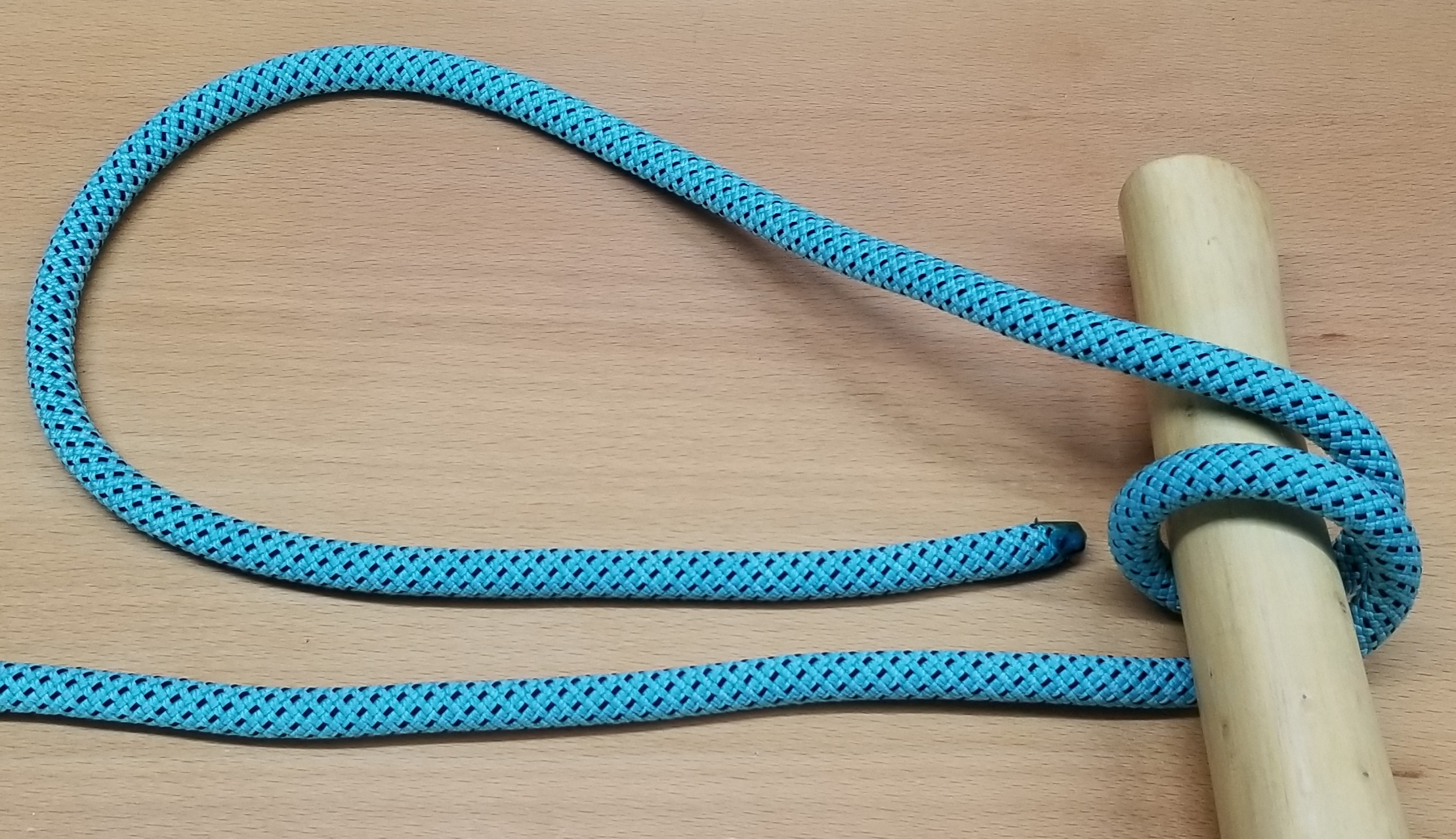
Take a round turn around the post.

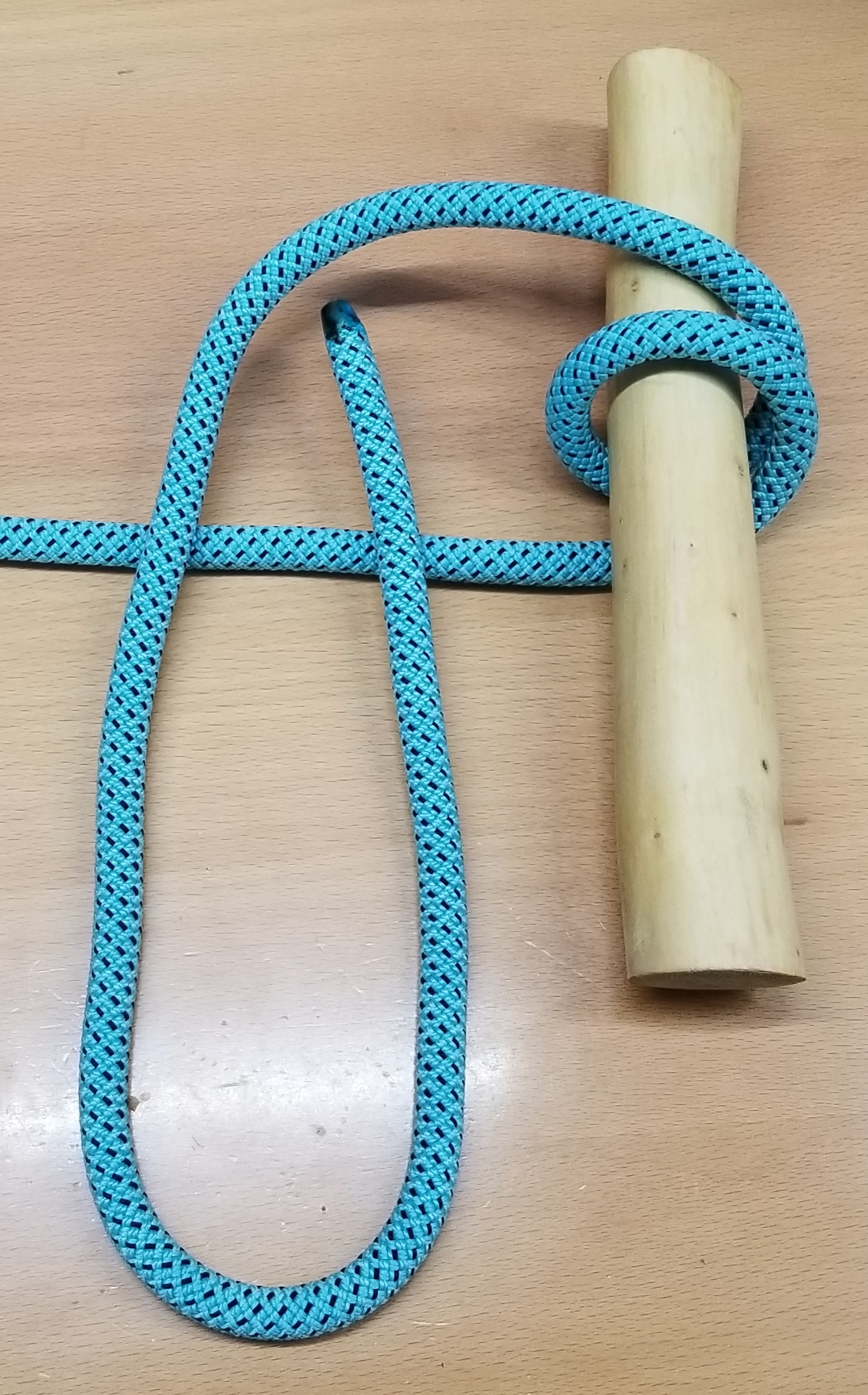
Make a bight and

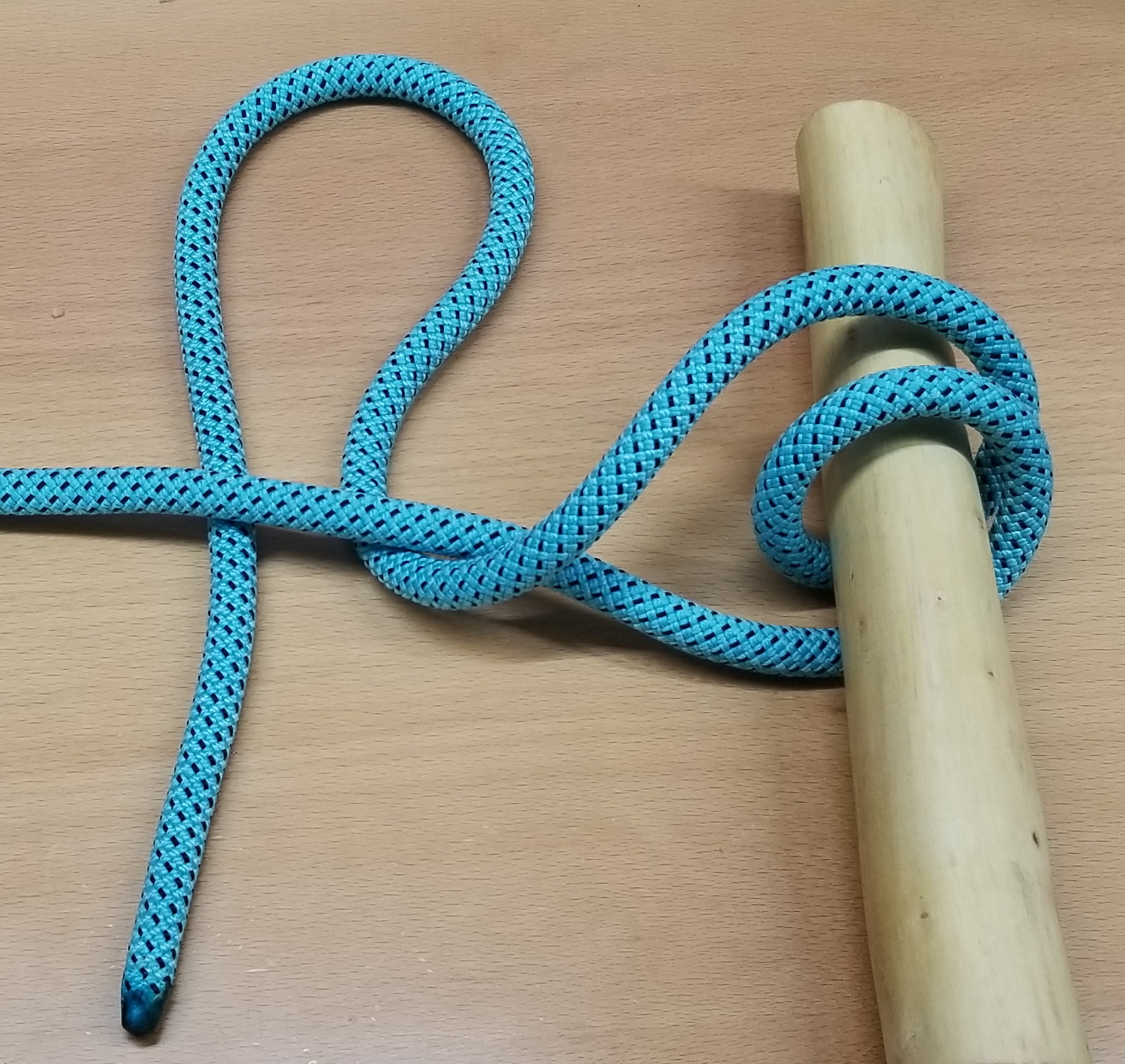
pass it under the standing part.

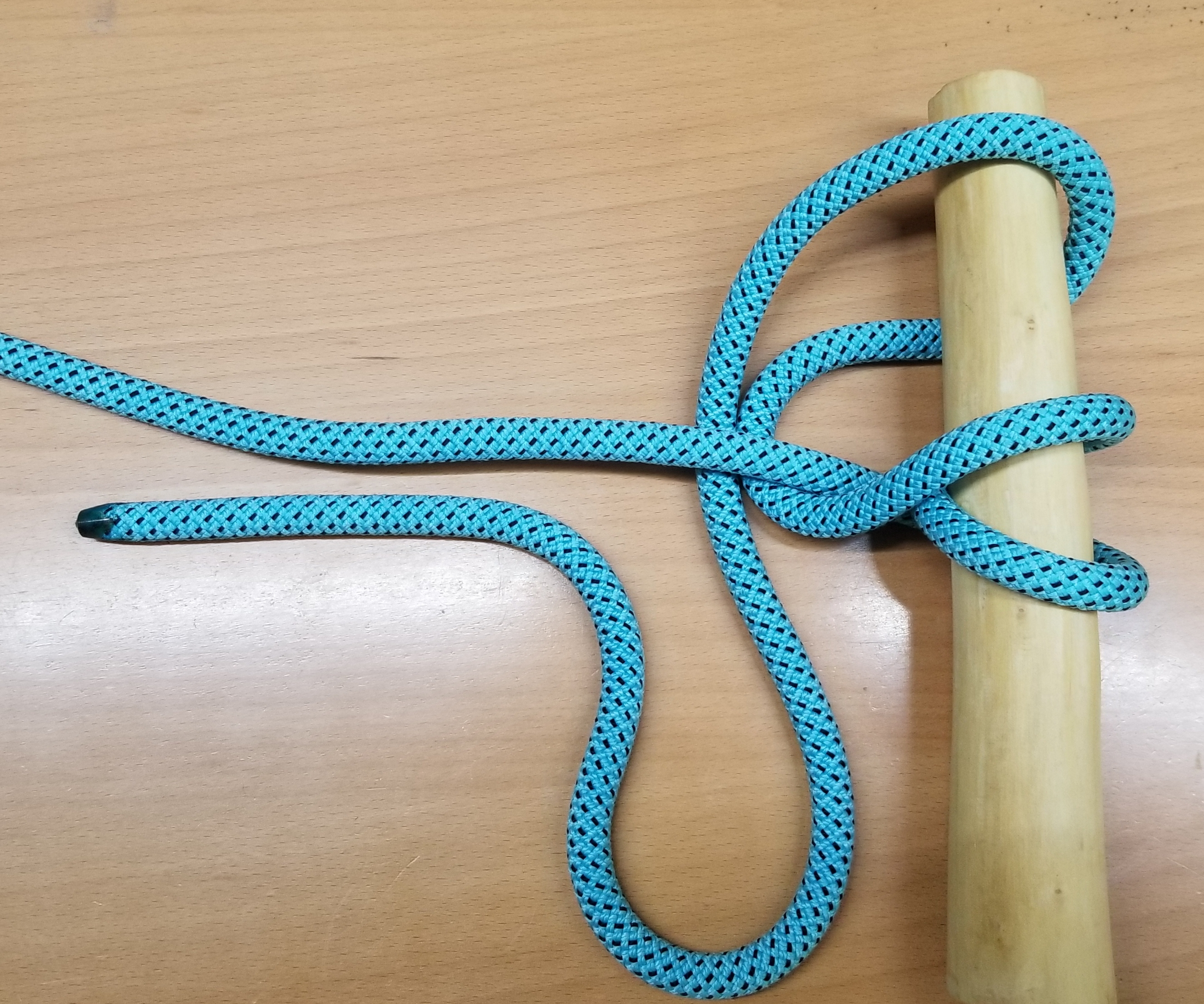
Drop the bight over the post.

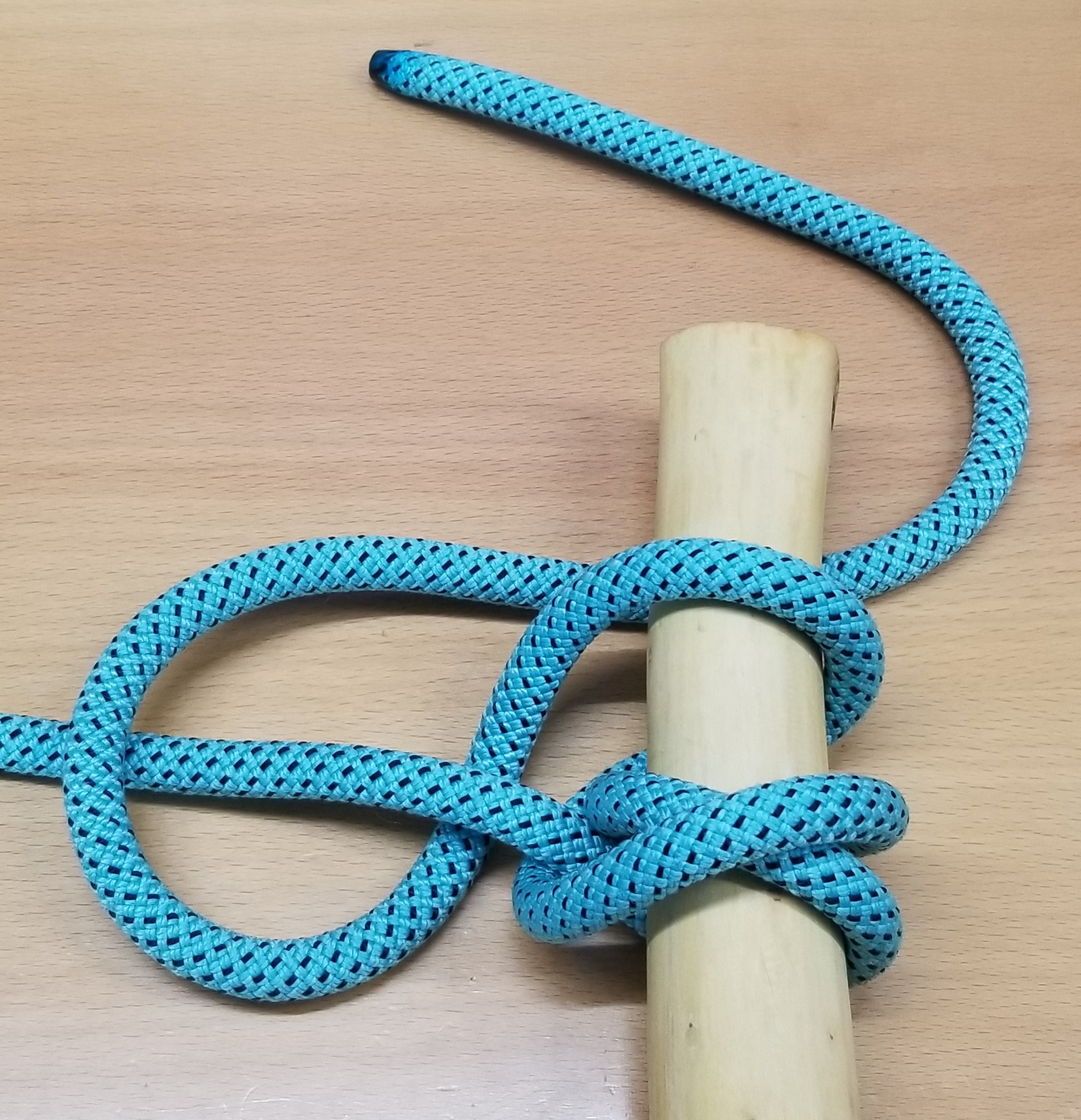
Turn the working end

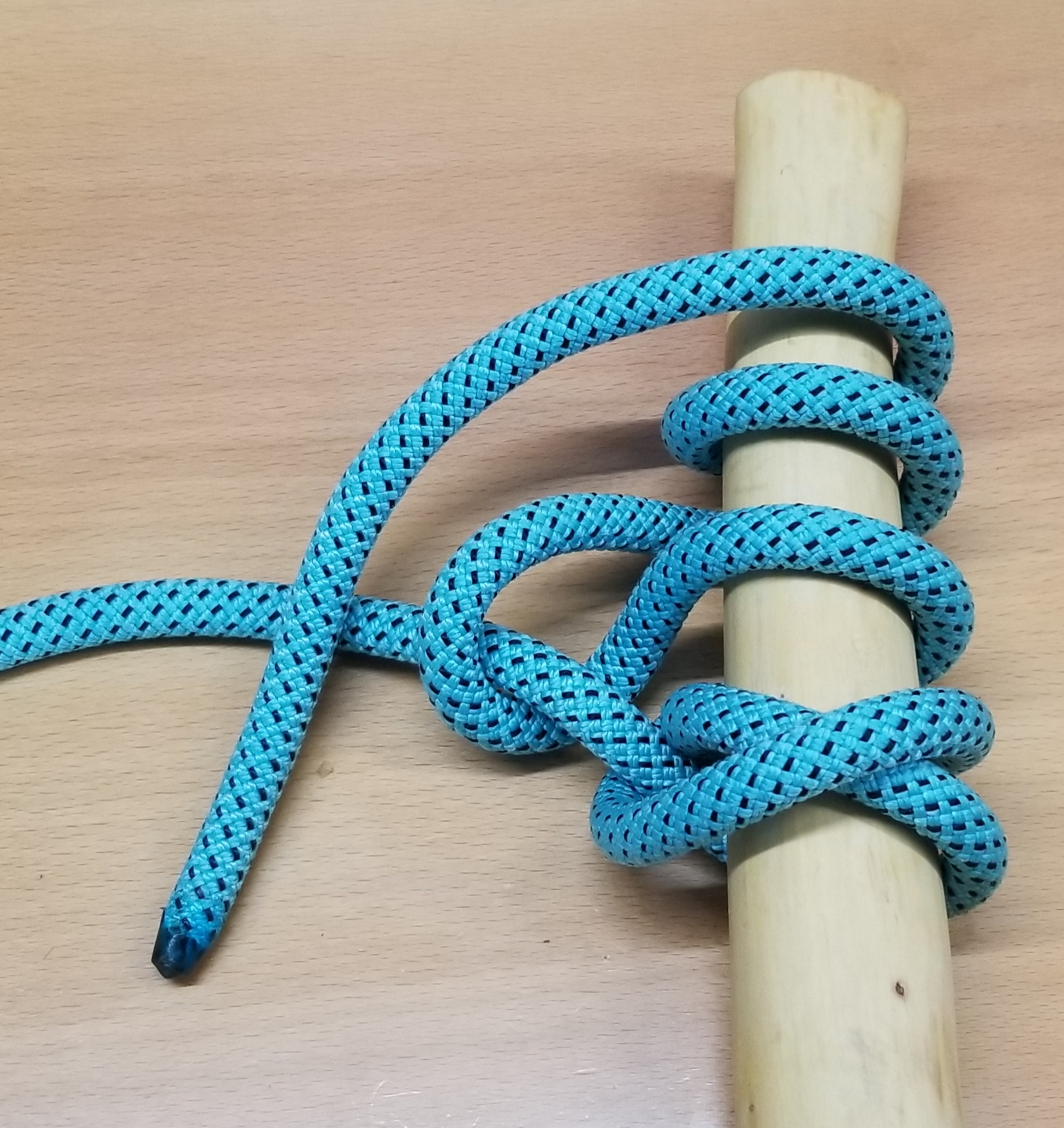
at least two times over the post

== See also ==
- List of knots
