= Gripping sailor's hitch =

Type of knot

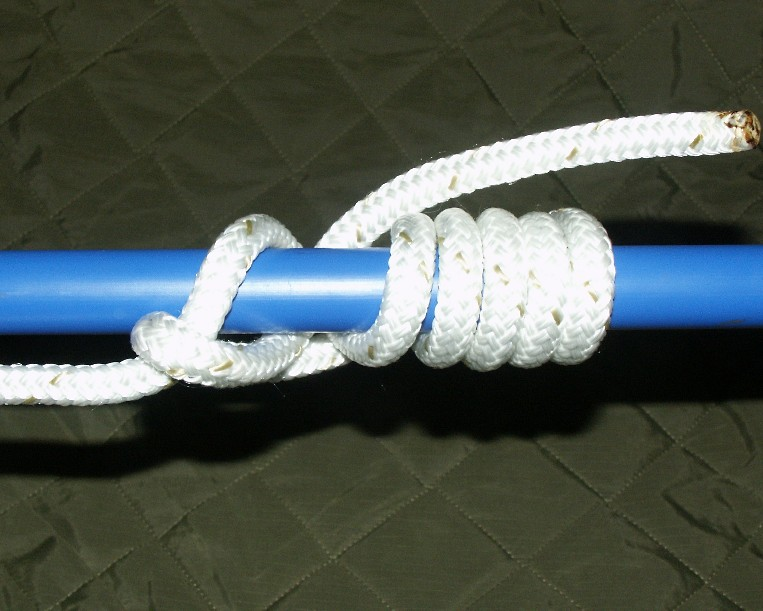
- Category: Hitch
- Related: Sailor's hitch, rolling hitch, Icicle hitch
- Releasing: Non-jamming
- Typical use: Tie one rope to another rope, boom, spar, shaft, etc., and pull lengthwise.

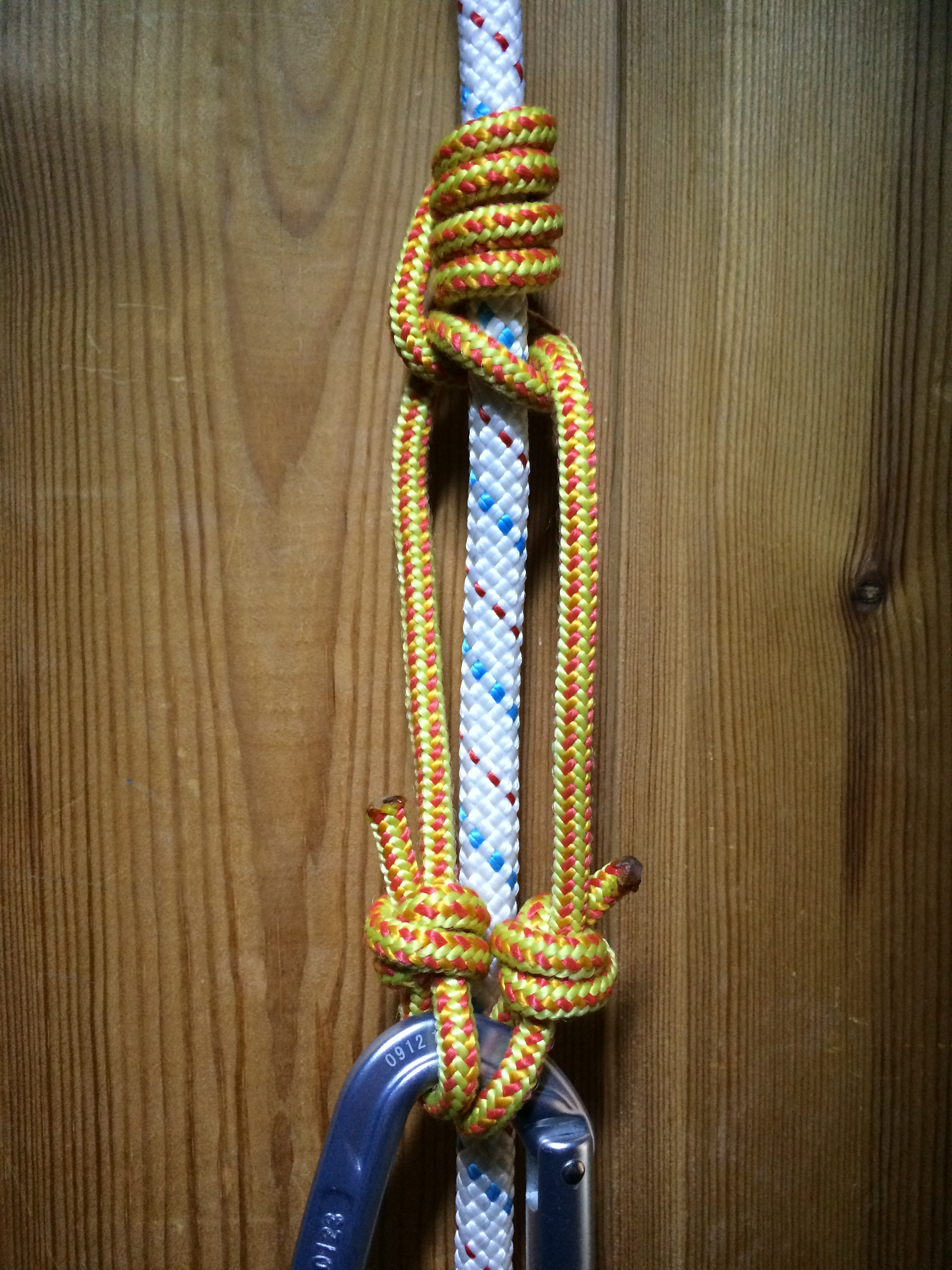
Michoacan-Martin

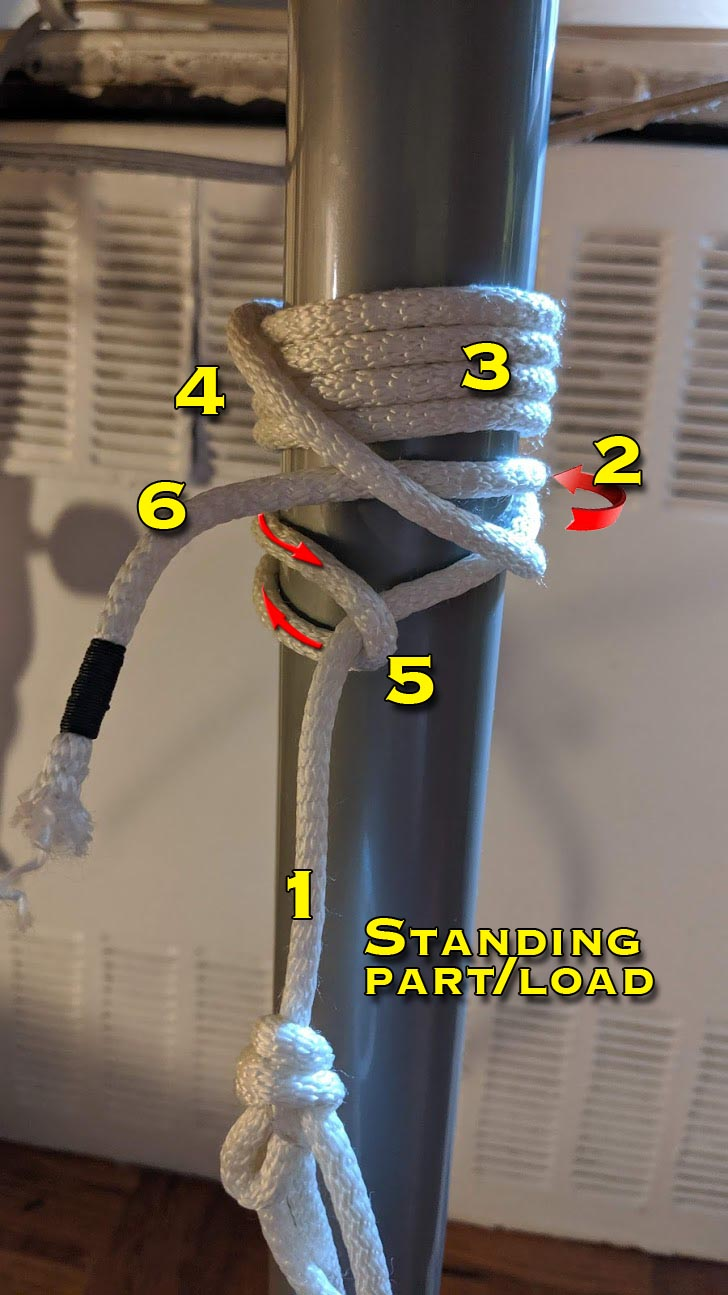
Step by step for Gripping Sailor's Hitch

The gripping sailor's hitch (Note: Sometimes incorrectly presented under name Sailor's gripping hitch. It is a gripping version of the Sailor's hitch, not a Sailor's version of a (non-existent) Gripping hitch.) is a secure, jam-proof friction hitch used to tie one rope to another, or a rope to a pole, boom, spar, etc., when the pull is lengthwise along the object. It will even grip a tapered object, such as a marlin spike, in the direction of taper, similar to the Icicle hitch, and it is much superior to the rolling hitch for that purpose.

== Tying ==
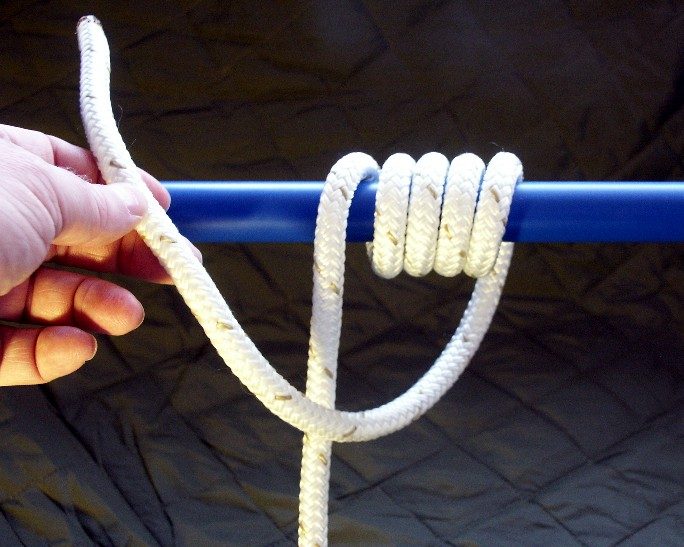
Make 5 turns around the object at opposite side of to the pull direction of the standing part, then cross the standing part to the pull direction and make one more turn

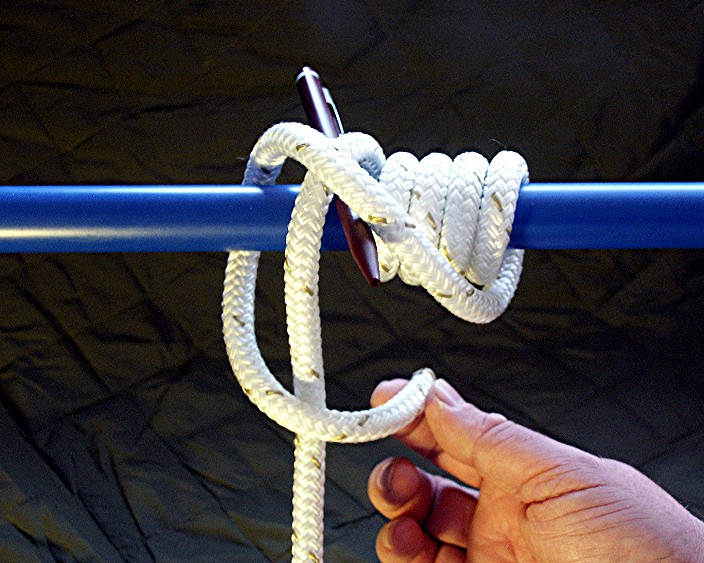
Cross back over the standing part in front, as you change the turn direction to opposite the wraps, come through from the back, and pass under the standing part (following the pen in pic).

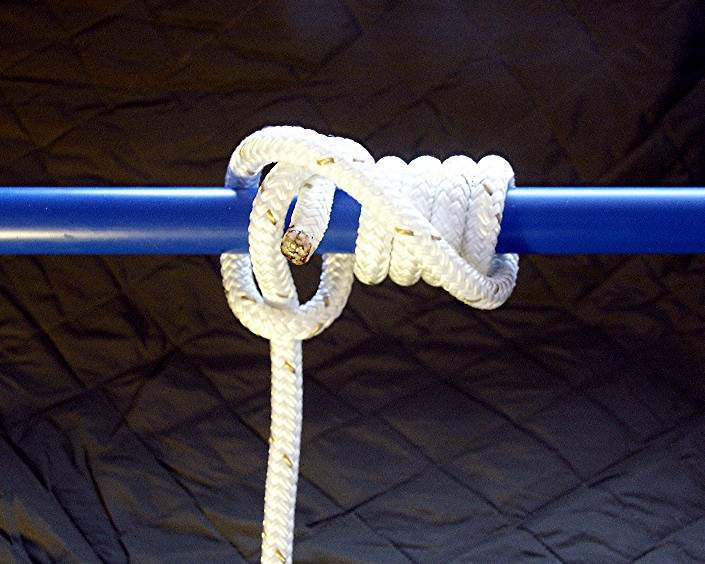
Tighten up before loading...

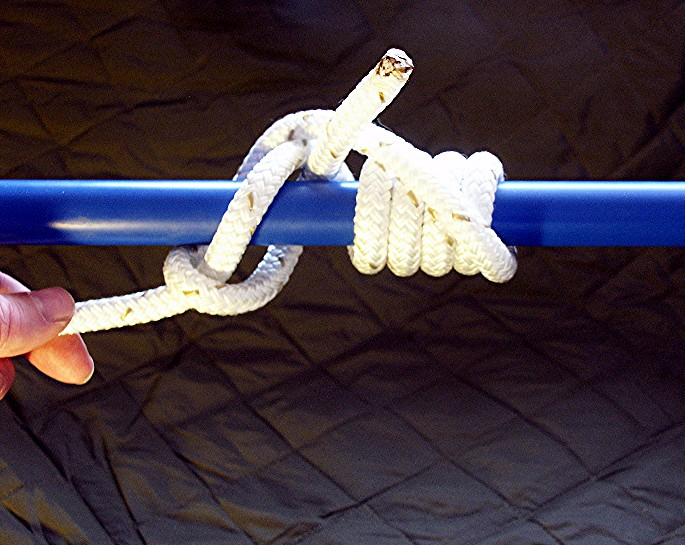
When pulled to the side opposite the 5 turns, this hitch will hold...

== See also ==
- List of knots
- Sailor's hitch
- Sailor's knot
- List of friction hitch knots
