= Improved clinch knot =

Fishing knot

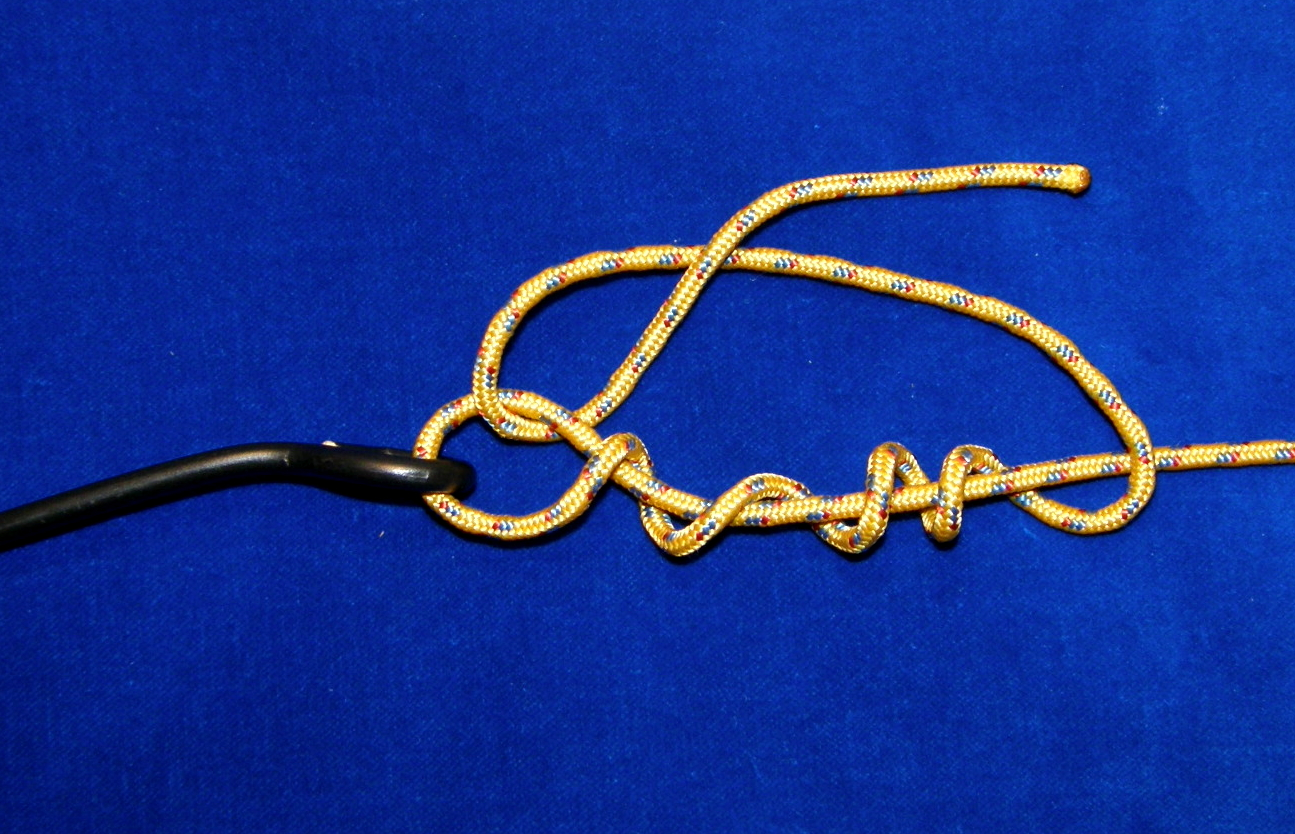
- Names: Improved clinch knot, fisherman's knot, salmon knot
- Category: Hitch
- Efficiency: 98%
- Origin: Unknown
- Typical use: fishing, angling, trapping
- ABoK: #313

The improved clinch knot, also known as the fisherman's knot or the salmon knot, is a knot that is used for securing a fishing line to the fishing lure, but can also affix fishing line to a swivel, clip, or artificial fly. This is a common knot used by anglers because of its simple tie and strong hold. The more tension is applied, the tighter the knot becomes, increasing the strength of the connection. It can be used with many kinds of line including mono-filament, fluorocarbon, and braided fishing line. The difference from the basic clinch knot is that the working end is passed through the loop that is created in the second-last step.

== See also ==
- List of knots
