= Icicle hitch =

Type of knot

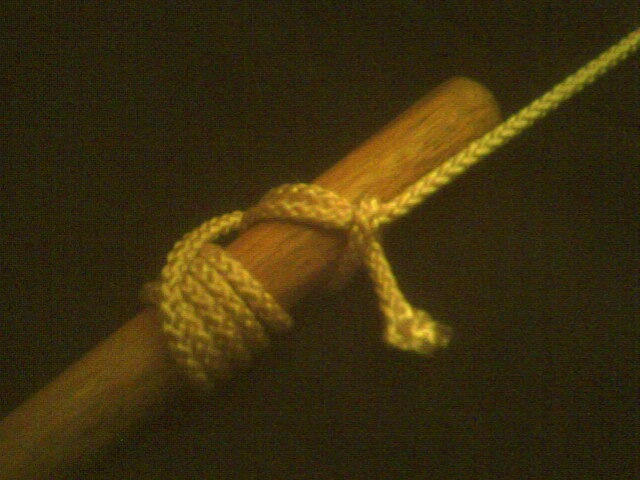
- Category: Hitch
- Origin: John Smith, 1990
- Related: Prusik, Klemheist knot, tautline hitch, gripping sailor's hitch
- Releasing: Unload the working end
- Typical use: Tying to a post when weight is applied parallel to the post; Tying to a rope when load is applied parallel to that rope
- Caveat: The Klemheist knot will look almost identical, but the load with the klemheist should be applied with the bight lying across the turns on the post/rope the knot is tied to

An icicle hitch is a knot that is used for connecting to a post when weight is applied to an end running parallel to the post in a specific direction. This type of hitch will hold its place even when holding a substantial load on a smooth surface. One can even suspend from a tapered post (such as a marlinspike) with this knot (hence the name "icicle hitch").

To tie an icicle hitch, bring the working end over the post, front to back, four or five times, working away from the end of the post (and the direction of expected pull). Bring the working end, back to front, alongside the standing end, leaving a substantial bight hanging behind the post. Bring this bight over both ends and over the end of the post. Tighten by pulling both ends perpendicular to the post. The pull on the standing end (running the direction of the post) will tighten the knot as more pull is given.

This knot is in the class of knots as the Prusik, klemheist, & Hedden knots --the "slip-and-grip" friction type, which pull tight when the load is applied (in the correct direction) and slide easily for re-placement with no load. The Prusik knot can withstand load in both directions, making it ideal for climbing situations. The icicle, like the klemheist, attaches to the hitched object and coils away from its pulling end, and relies on a constriction like the Chinese finger trap --under pull, the coil is drawn longer and thus tighter; whereas in the Hedden (& rolling hitch) the loading tightens the coil at its far end.

The icicle hitch was developed by John Smith of the International Guild of Knot Tyers, and demonstrated by him at the Guild's eighth annual general meeting in 1990. It was published in the IGKT's quarterly newsletter, Knotting Matters, in issue #32 (Summer 1990), pp.6,7.

== Tying ==
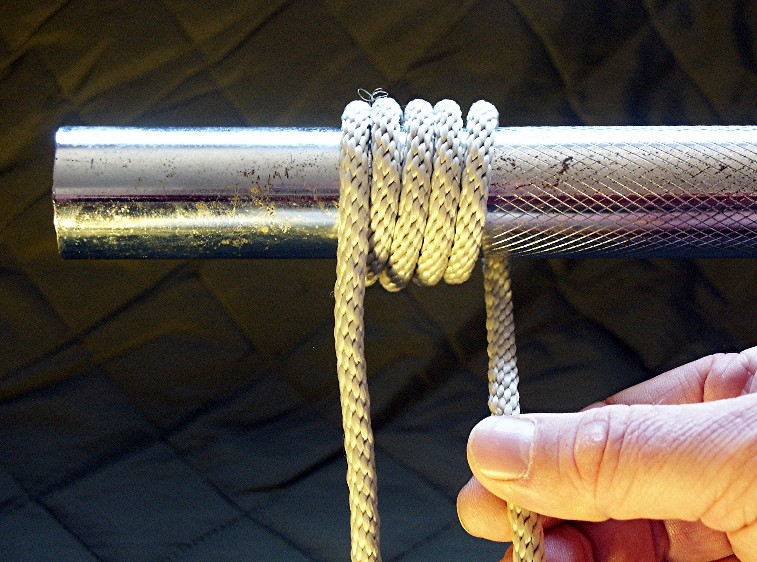
Pull direction is LEFT, so make 5 turns to the RIGHT...

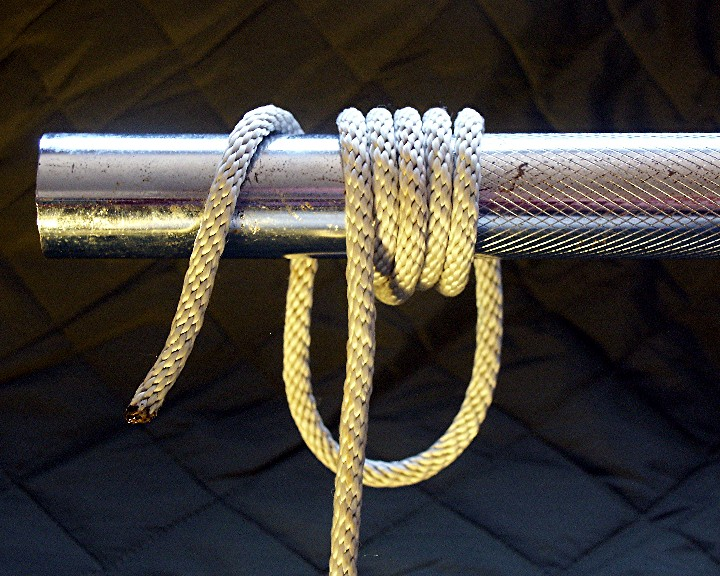
Drape working end over rod so it hangs beside standing part...

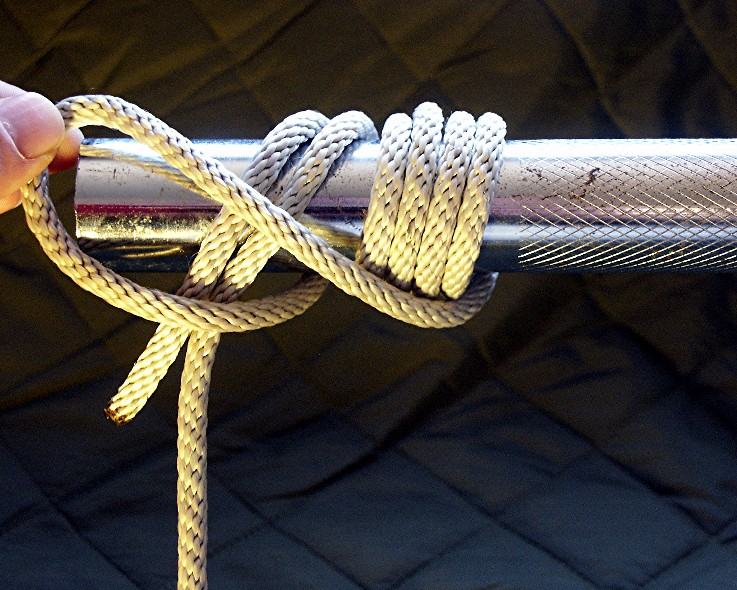
Loop the bight created around working and standing parts and over end of rod.

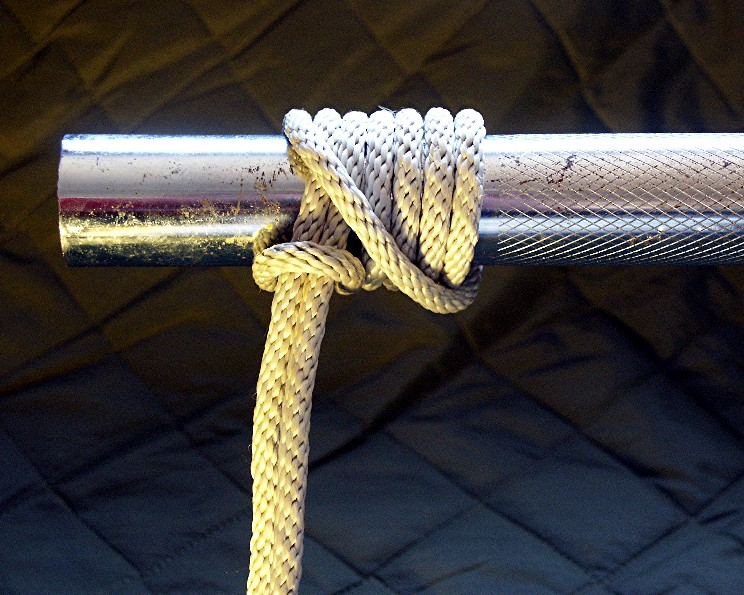
Set up tight...

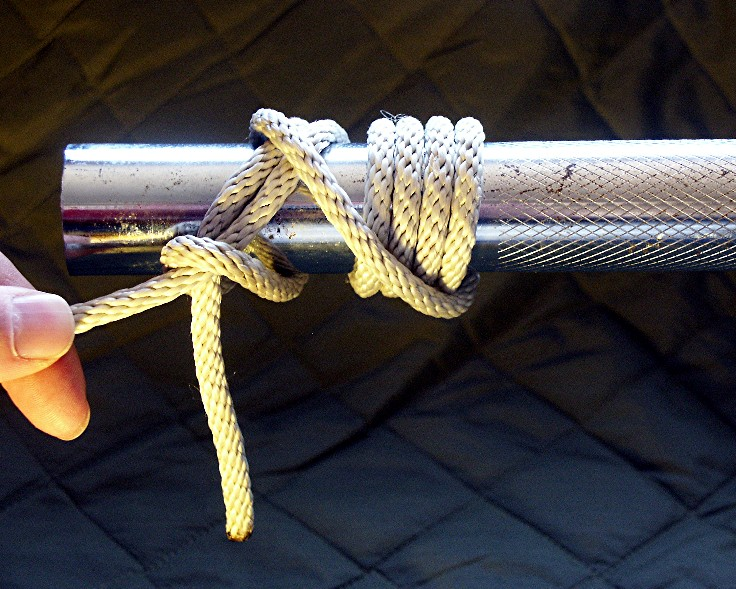
Knot is now secure when pulled toward the left.

== See also ==
- List of knots
- List of friction hitch knots
