= Double overhand noose =

Hitch knot

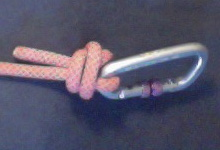
- Names: Double overhand noose, Scaffold, Poacher's Knot
- Category: Hitch
- Efficiency: High
- Related: Noose, Double overhand knot, Double fisherman's knot
- Releasing: Jamming
- Typical use: Bind a carabiner
- Caveat: Difficult to untie
- ABoK: #409, #1120, #1228

The double overhand noose is a very secure hitch knot. It might be used by cavers and canyoneers to bind a cow tail or a foot loop to a carabiner.

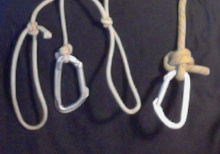
Double overhand noose binding carabiners. (Note: The running end is stored in the bight.) (Note: Foot loops tied with a zeppelin loop and an alpine butterfly knot.)

== Details ==
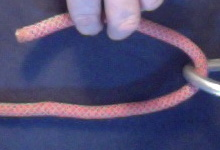
Make a bight

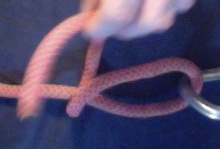
Turn around the standing end

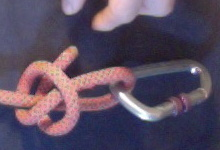
the 2nd round rides the 1st

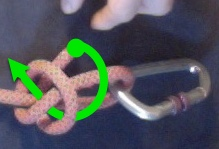
Tie inside the two rounds

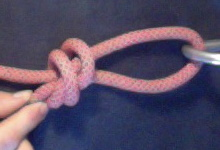

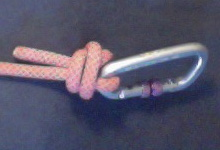
Tighten

A heavily tightened double overhand noose will jam. The bound object has to be removed before untying.

As the double overhand knot, it neither slips nor turns around. However, a third round turn might be useful with some highly lubricious spectra/nylon ropes.

== See also ==
- List of hitch knots
- List of knots
