= Hitch (knot) =

Type of knot used to join a rope to an object

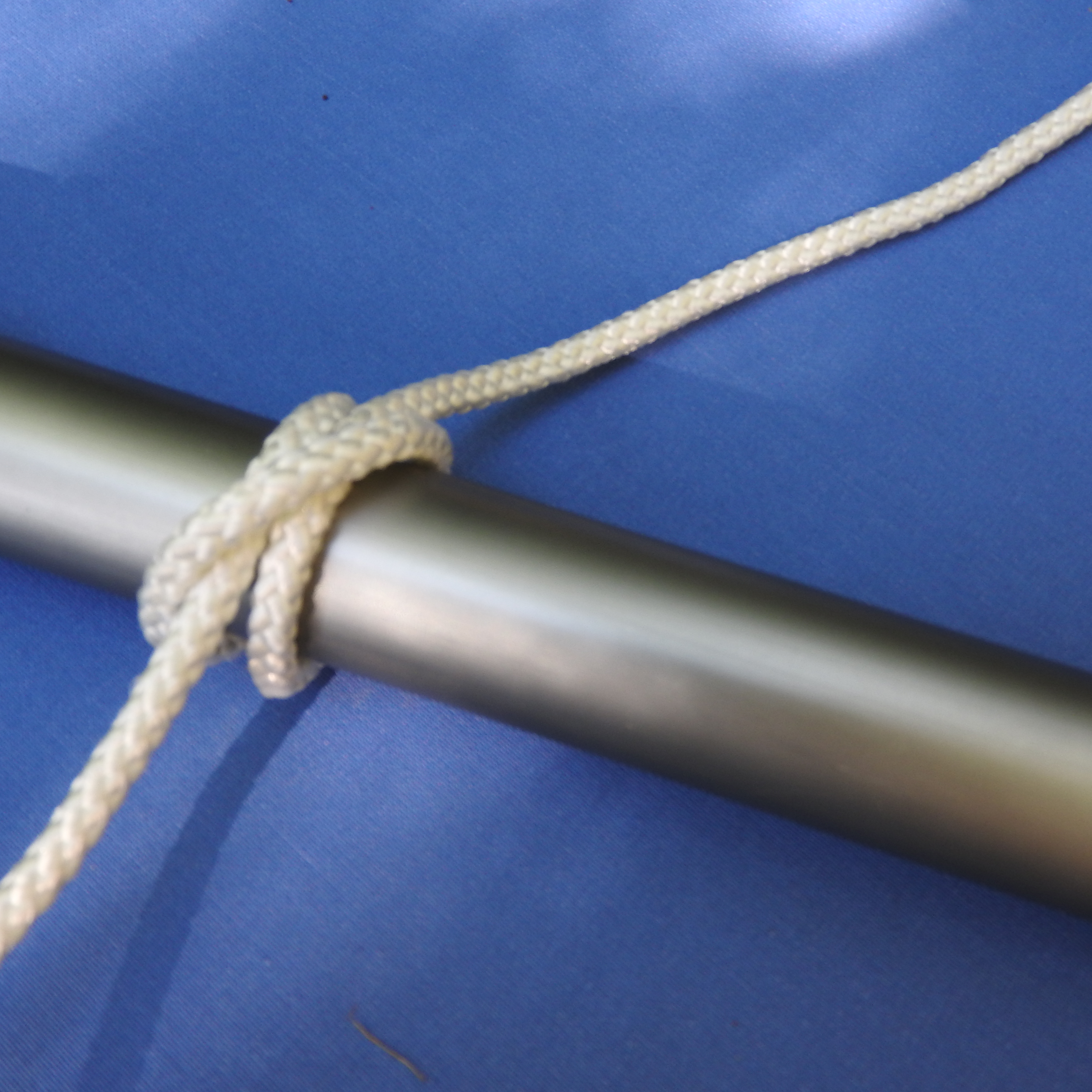
The clove hitch

A hitch is a type of knot used to secure a rope to an object or another rope. Hitches are used in a variety of situations, including climbing, sailing, and securing loads. They are classified based on their ability to be tightened or released, their resistance to slipping, and their strength. Some common types of hitch knots include the clove hitch, the timber hitch, and the round turn and two half-hitches.

== Physical theory ==
A simple mathematical theory of hitches has been proposed by Bayman. It predicts whether or not a hitch will hold, given the diameter of the post, the diameter of the rope, and the coefficient of friction between the post and the rope. The theory has been extended by Maddocks and Keller, including an approximate treatment of knots that are not hitches. For example, they predict that a square knot will hold when the coefficient of friction of the rope with itself is greater than 0.24. These predictions are approximately correct when tested empirically.

== Alphabetical list ==
Knot	Description	Image
Adjustable grip hitch	A simple and useful friction hitch which may easily be shifted up and down the rope while slack.	
Alternate ring hitching	A type of ringbolt hitching formed with a series of alternate left and right hitches made around a ring	
Anchor bend	A knot used for attaching a rope to a ring	
Bale sling hitch	A knot which traditionally uses a continuous loop of strap to form a cow hitch around an object in order to hoist or lower it.	
Barrel hitch	The "barrel hitch" and "barrel sling," named for their use in hoisting cargo aboard ships, are a simple yet effective way to suspend an object.	
Becket hitch	Any hitch that is made on an eye loop, i.e., on a becket.	
Blackwall hitch	A temporary means of attaching a rope to a hook.	
Blake's hitch	A friction hitch commonly used by arborists and tree climbers as an ascending knot.	
Boom hitch	A rather robust and secure method of attaching a line, or rope to a fixed object like a pipe, post, or sail boom	
Bottom-loaded release hitch		
Buntline hitch	A knot used for attaching a rope to an object. It is formed by passing the working end around an object, then making a clove hitch around the rope's standing part, taking care that the turns of the clove hitch progress towards the object rather than away from it.	
Cat's paw	A knot used for connecting a rope to an object.	
Chain hitch	A knot used to connect a rope to a cylindrical object. Similar to the marline hitch, but formed with successive Clove hitch knots.	
Clinging clara		
Clove hitch	A clove hitch is two successive half-hitches around an object.	
Continuous ring hitching	A series of identical hitches made around a ring	
Cow hitch variant		
Cow hitch with toggle		
Cow hitch	A hitch knot used to attach a rope to an object.	
Double overhand noose	A hitch knot used to bind a rope to a carabiner.	
Farrimond friction hitch	A quick release adjustable friction hitch for use on lines under tension.	
Garda hitch	A ratcheting knot used to disallow dual direction rope travel.	
Gripping sailor's hitch	A secure, jam-proof hitch used to tie one rope to another, or a rope to a pole, boom, spar, etc., when the pull is lengthwise along the object.	
Ground-line hitch	A type of knot used to attach a rope to an object.	
Half hitch	A simple overhand knot, where the working end of a line is brought over and under the standing part.	
Halter hitch	A type of knot used to connect a rope to an object.	
Highpoint hitch	A type of knot used to attach a rope to an object.	
Highwayman's hitch	A quick-release draw loop knot used for temporarily securing a rope that will need to be released easily and cleanly.	
Hitching tie	A simple knot used to tie off stuff sacks that allows quick access as it unties quickly.	
Icicle hitch	A knot for connecting to a post when weight is applied to an end running parallel to the post in a specific direction.	
Improved clinch knot	Also known as the Salmon Knot, a knot that is often used for securing a fishing line to a hook or lure.	
Killick hitch	A type of hitch knot used to attach a rope to oddly shaped objects.	
Knute hitch	A knot used to attach a lanyard of small stuff to a marlingspike or other tool.	
Magnus hitch	A knot used to attach a rope to a rod, pole, or other rope. (See also Rolling hitch)	
Marline Hitching	A knot used to attach a rope to a cylindrical object. Similar in appearance to the Chain Hitch, but a succession of overhand knots.	
Marlinespike hitch	A temporary knot used to attach a rod to a rope in order to form a handle.	
Midshipman's hitch	An adjustable loop knot for use on lines under tension.	
Munter hitch	A simple knot, commonly used by climbers and cavers as part of a life-lining or belay system	
Ossel hitch	A knot used to attach a rope or line to an object.	
Palomar knot	A knot that is used for securing a fishing line to a fishing lure, snap or swivel.	
Pile hitch	A kind of hitch, which is a knot used for attaching rope to a pole or other structure.	
Pipe hitch	A hitch-type knot used to secure smooth cylindrical objects.	
Prusik knot	A friction hitch or knot used to put a loop of cord around a rope, applied in climbing, canyoneering, mountaineering, caving, rope rescue, and by arborists.	
Reverse half hitches		
Round turn and two half-hitches		
Sailor's hitch	A secure, jam-proof hitch.	
Siberian hitch	A knot used to attach a rope to an object.	
Slippery hitch	A knot used to attach a line to a rod or bar.	
Snell knot	A hitch knot used to attach an eyed fishing hook to fishing line.	
Snuggle hitch	A modification of the clove hitch	
Taut-line hitch	An adjustable loop knot for use on lines under tension.	
Tensionless hitch	An anchor knot used for rappelling or rope rescue.	
Timber hitch	A knot used to attach a single length of rope to a cylindrical object.	
Trilene knot	A multi-purpose fishing knot that can be used for attaching monofilament line to hooks, swivels and lures.	
Trucker's hitch	A compound knot commonly used for securing loads on trucks or trailers.	
Tugboat hitch (Lighterman's hitch)	An easy release knot ideal for heavy towing.	
Tumble hitch	A quick-release draw loop knot used for temporarily securing a rope that will need to be released easily and cleanly.	
Two half-hitches	A type of knot, specifically a binding knot or hitch knot.	
Uni knot	A multi purpose fishing knot that can be used for attaching the fishing line to the arbor of a reel, for joining lines, and for attaching lures, snaps, and swivels.	

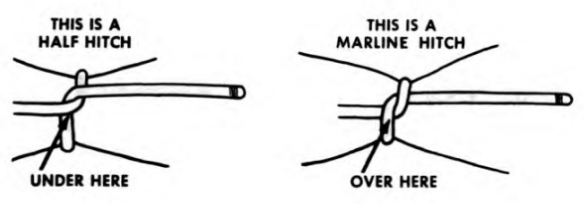
Distinguishing between a half hitch and a marline hitch

== See also ==
- List of knots
- Single hitch
