= Round turn and two half-hitches =

Type of knot

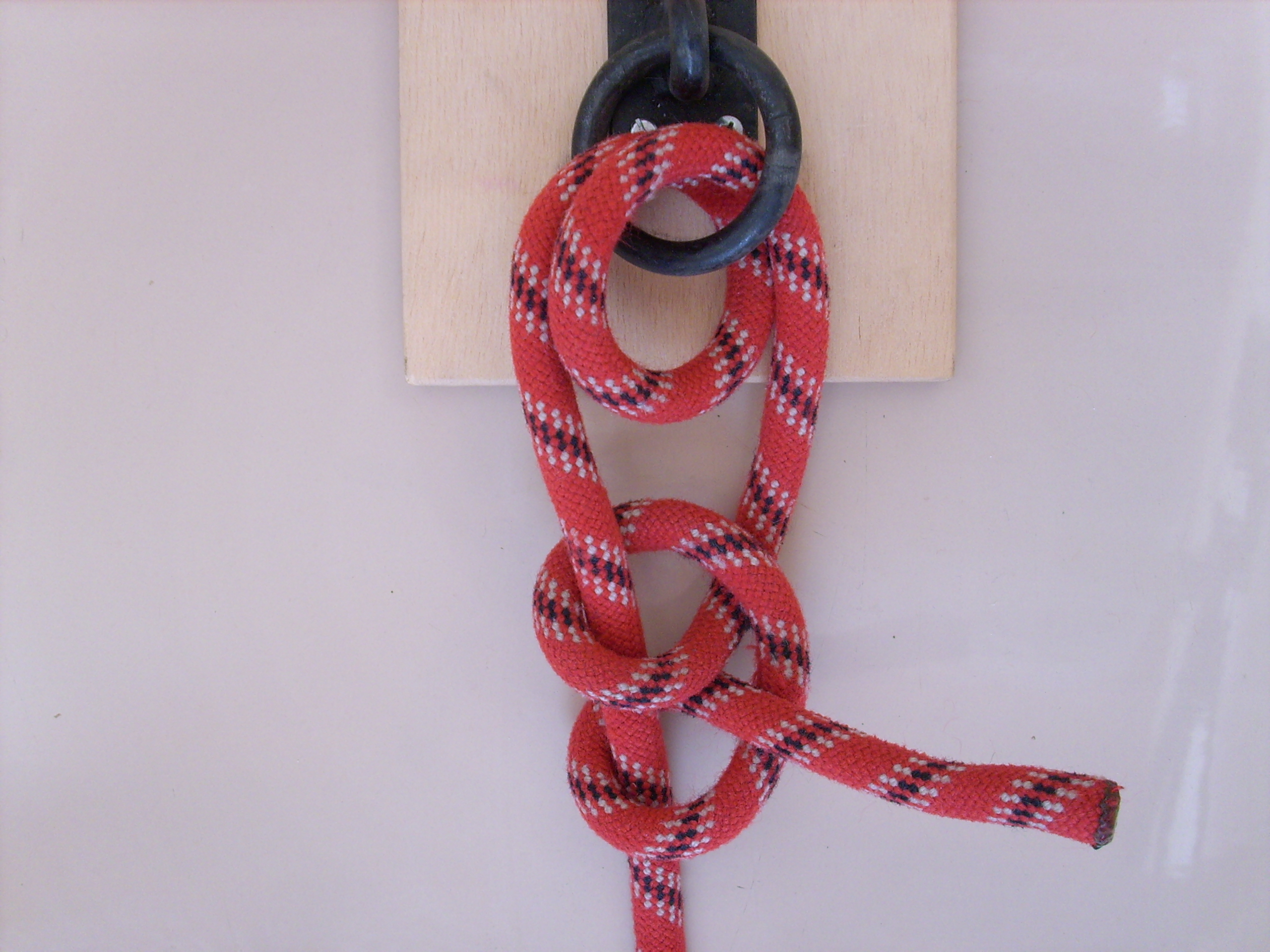
- Names: Round turn and two half-hitches, Round turn and a half-hitch, Two round turns and two half-hitches, etc.
- Category: Hitch
- Related: Two half-hitches, Clove hitch, Buntline hitch, capstan equation
- Typical use: Secure the end of a rope to a fixed object.
- ABoK: #1720, #1721, #1784, #1834, #1835, #1836, #1883, #1884, #1910

The round turn and two half-hitches is a hitch used to secure the end of a rope to a fixed object. The name refers to the components used to form the knot: a round turn wraps the rope around the object (completely encircling it) and the two half-hitches secure the end around the standing part. Variations of this hitch can be made with differing numbers of turns and half-hitches; an example is illustrated below. With additional turns, it becomes a pipe hitch.

The Round Turn and Two Half Hitches is named by Steel in 1794. If a spar is small, a round turn is preferable to a single turn. It makes a stronger knot and dissipates the wear.

— Clifford W Ashley, Ashley Book of Knots,

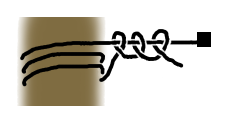
Two round turns and three half-hitches.
