= One-sided =

One-sided may refer to:

- Biased
- One-sided argument, a logical fallacy
- In calculus, one-sided limit, either of the two limits of a function f(x) of a real variable x as x approaches a specified point
- One-sided (algebra)
- One-sided overhand bend, simple method of joining two cords or threads together
- One-sided test, a statistical test

== See also ==
- Unilateralism
