= Beer knot =

Type of knot

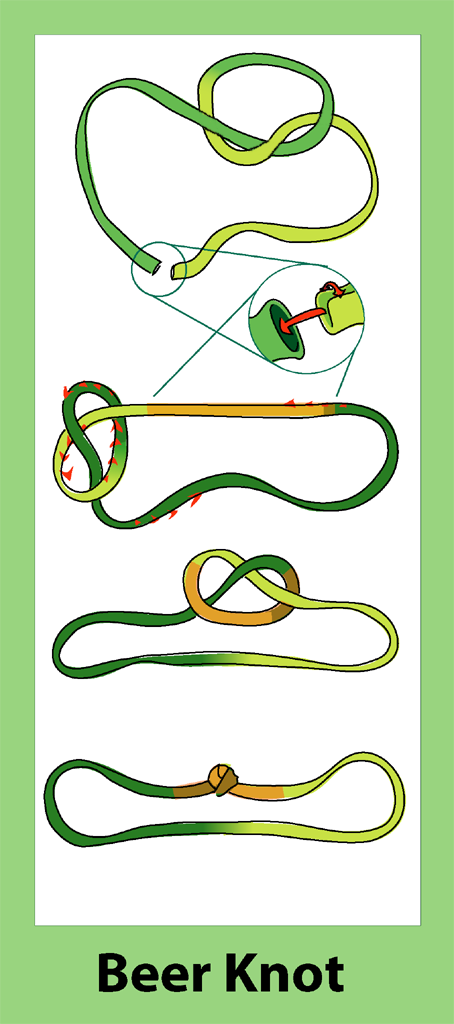
- Category: Bend
- Efficiency: 80%
- Related: Water knot
- Releasing: Jamming
- Typical use: Making slings with tubular webbing
- Caveat: Difficult to visually assess the length of the free end inside webbing

A beer knot is a bend used to join tubular webbing. Its most common application is in constructing slings used in rock climbing. Compared with the water knot, it has the advantages of a higher strength, smaller profile, and a cleaner appearance due to the lack of free-hanging tails. However, the beer knot can be more difficult to tie than the water knot, and one of the tails is hidden from view, making safety checks for adequate tail length more difficult.

Testing by PMI in 1995 showed that the beer knot preserves about 80% of the strength of the webbing.

The beer knot was introduced to the National Speleological Society in the 1980s by Peter Ludwig, from Austria.

== See also ==
- List of bend knots
- List of knots
