= Offset figure-eight bend =

Dangerous knot

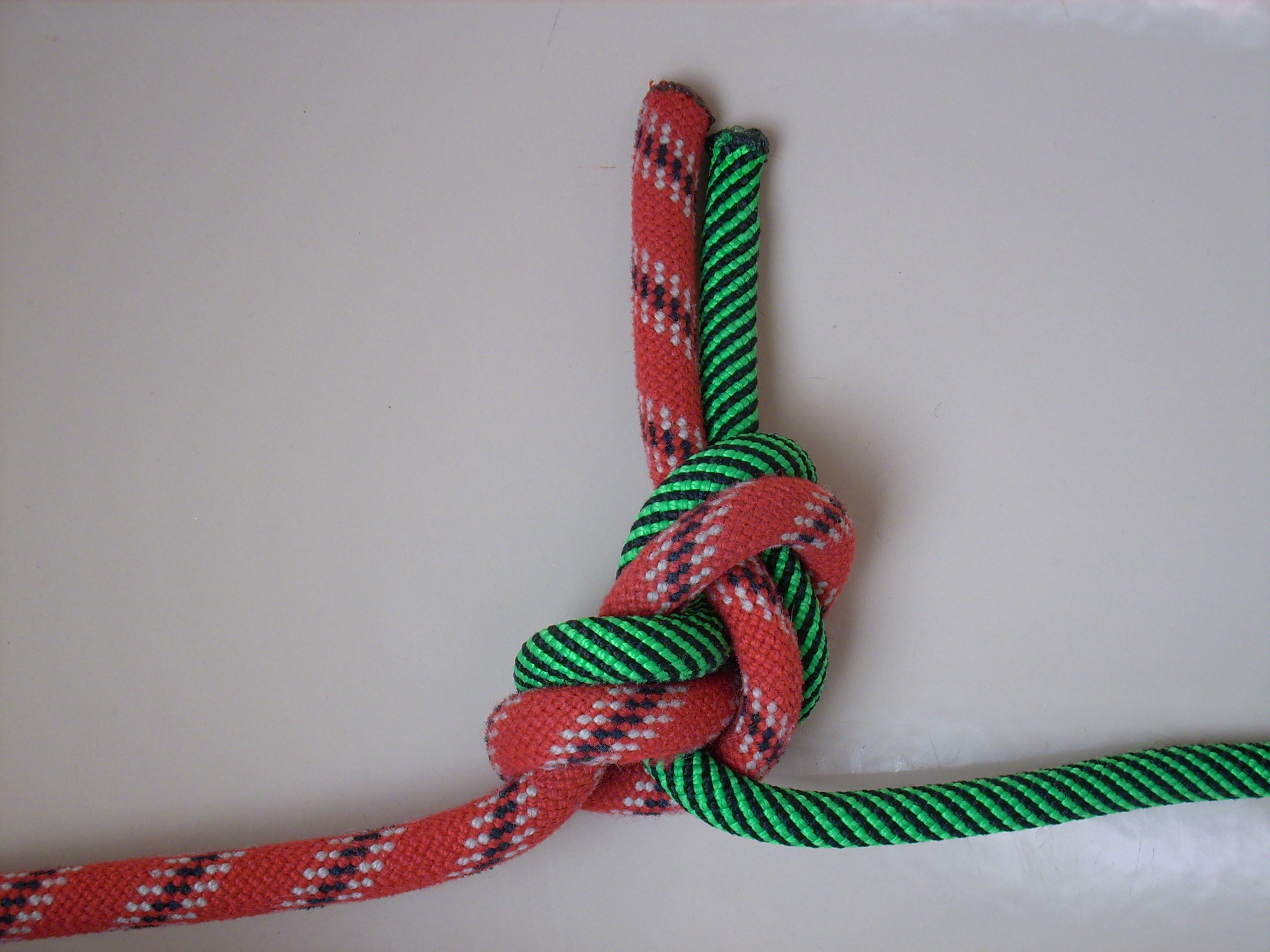
- Names: Offset figure-eight bend, flat figure-eight bend, abnormal figure-eight bend

The offset figure-eight bend is a poor knot that has been implicated in the deaths of several rock climbers. The knot may capsize (invert) under load, as shown in the figure, and this can happen repeatedly. Each inversion reduces the lengths of the tails. Once the tails are used up completely, the knot comes undone.

An offset figure-eight knot inverting itself

More secure knots for this purpose are the Flemish bend (the "figure eight bend"), (doubled) offset overhand bend, or double fisherman's knot.

== See also ==
- List of knots
