= Adjustable bend =

Type of bend knot

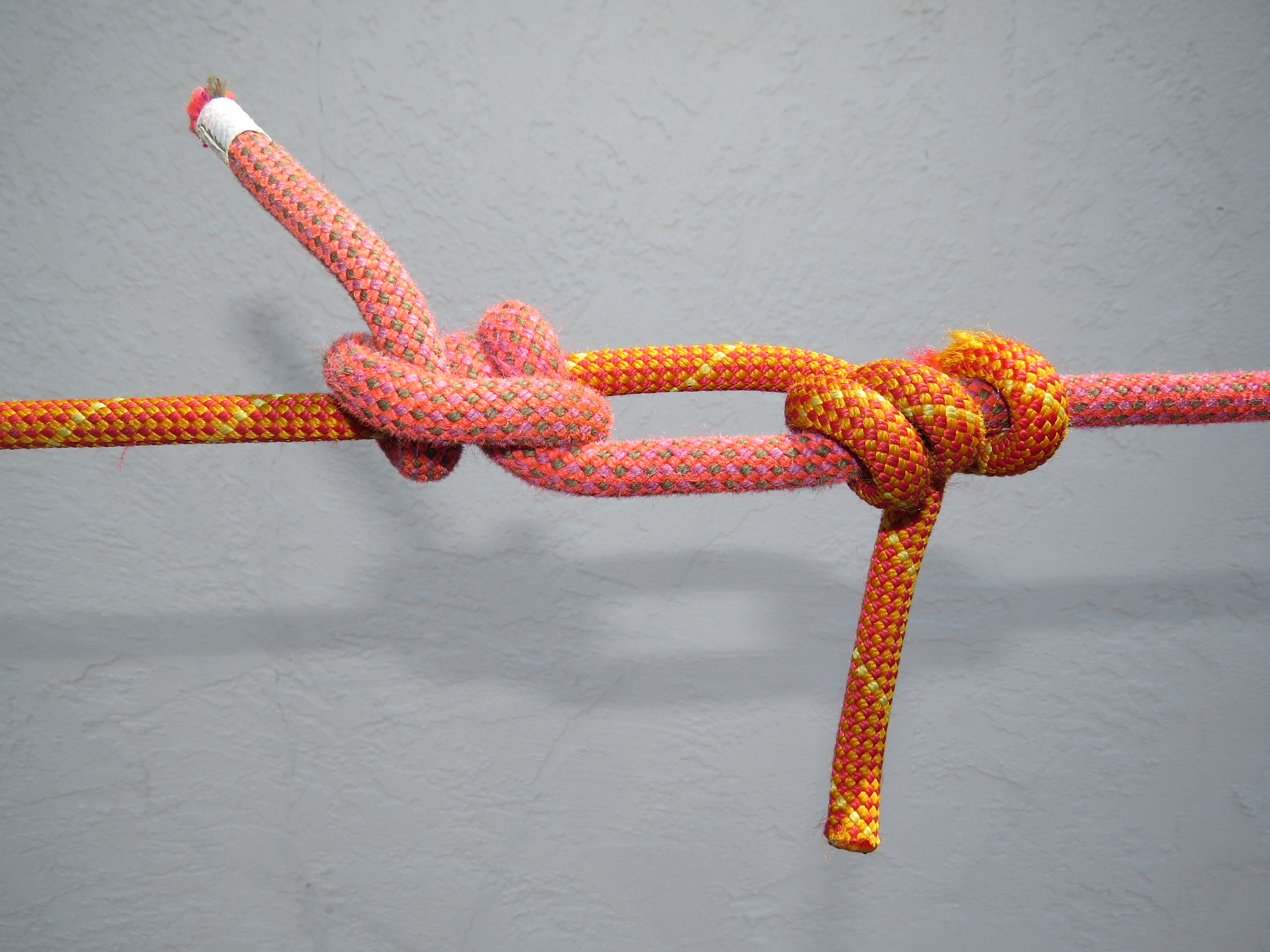
- An adjustable bend, joining two kernmantle ropes
- Category: Bend
- Related: rolling hitch, taut-line hitch
- Releasing: Non-jamming
- Typical use: Climbing
- ABoK: 1472, 2558, 2031

The adjustable bend is a bend knot that is easy to lengthen or shorten.

A rolling hitch is used to tie the end of each rope to the standing part of the other. Clifford Ashley suggested it for tying guy ropes.

== See also ==
- List of bend knots
- List of knots
