= Water knot =

Type of knot

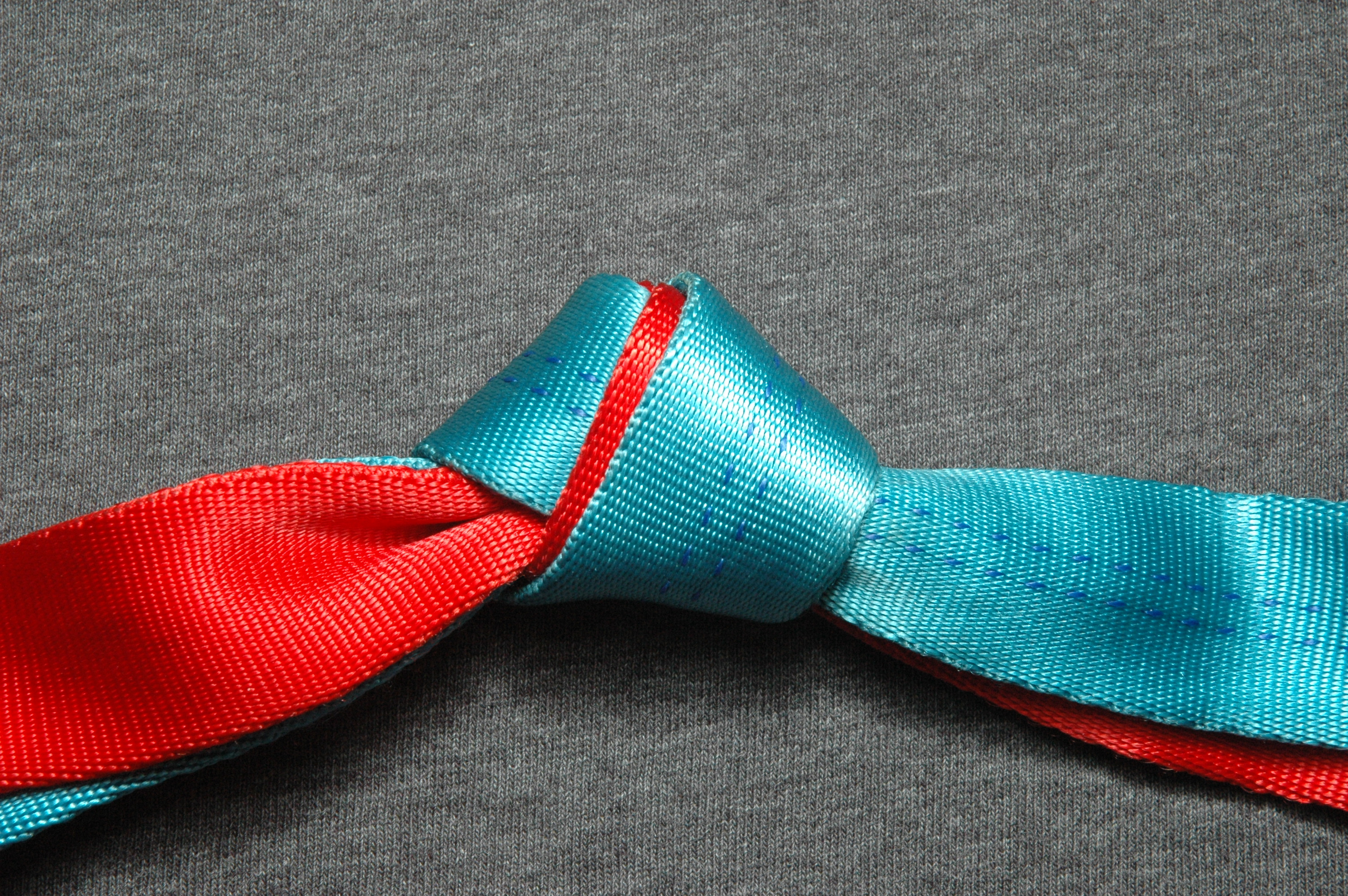
- Names: Water knot, Tape knot, Ring bend, Grass knot, Overhand follow through
- Category: Bend
- Related: Overhand knot, beer knot, overhand bend
- Typical use: To join webbing for climbing
- Caveat: Ends should be left long, knot should be tightened and inspected before each use. Difficult to untie.
- ABoK: #296, #1412, #343
- Instructions: animatedknots.com

The water knot (also tape knot, ring bend, grass knot, or overhand follow-through) is a knot frequently used in climbing for joining two ends of webbing together, for instance when making a sling.

== Tying ==
It is tied by forming an overhand knot in one end and then following it with the other end, feeding in the opposite direction.

The ends should be left at least 7.5 centimetres (3.0 in) long and the knot should be "set" by tightening it with full body weight. The ends can be knotted, taped or lightly sewn to the standing parts to help prevent them from creeping back into the knot.

=== Variations ===
The figure-8 water knot (or figure-8 bend or Flemish bend) is based upon a figure-8 (or Flemish) knot instead of an overhand knot. It is easier to untie.

== Uses ==
The knot can be used for joining flat materials such as leather or tape.

== Security ==
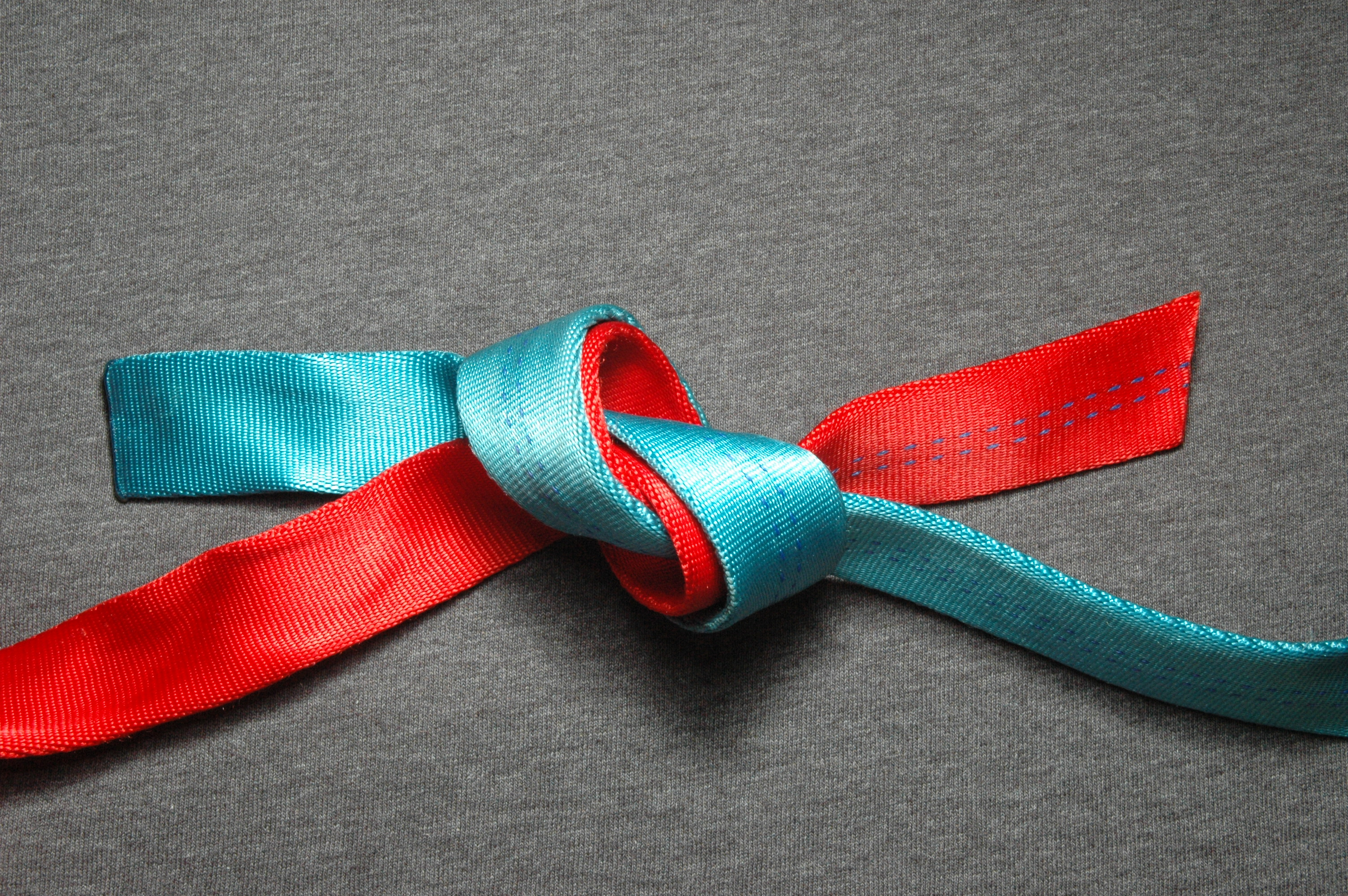
Water knot before tightening

Once tied, for additional security each end should be tied in a double overhand stopper knot around the other standing end.

Some testing has shown that the water knot, in certain conditions, can slip very slightly but very consistently, with cyclic loading and unloading at relatively low forces; it is the tail on the exterior that slips (this would be the blue tail in the image presented here). In tests using 9/16 in (14.3 mm) tubular nylon webbing, repeated loading and unloading with 250 lbs (113 kg) caused one of the 3 in (76 mm) tails to work back into the knot in just over 800 loading cycles. Another test showed similar results for Spectra tape (but not for new, 1-inch tubular nylon). And yet the knot can be loaded to rupture without slippage. These results validate the need to leave adequate tails and inspect water knots before each use. With single overhand knot safeties on either end, the combination eventually seized and the slipping stopped.

Although used extensively in climbing and caving, there is some opinion that the water knot is unsafe. According to Walter Siebert, several deaths have been reported due to failure of this knot (although, as in many failed-knot cases, the actual mechanism of failure is unknown, and only conjecture can be inferred). He demonstrates in a video how easily the knot can pull loose if snagged. Siebert references an article from Pit Schubert in 1995 that details many deaths investigated where the water knot was used with webbing and failed. Schubert drew the conclusion after reviewing the remaining webbing and the sites where these falls took place that the knot can open if it catches on an edge or any protrusion.

However, these analyses fail to note that this uncommon vulnerability can lead to trouble only if (a) the knot will move much under load, so as to pull out enough tail to fail, and (b) the exterior strand is loaded from the top, resulting in a downwards pull by the interior strand (the red one, as shown here) that pulls it away from the snagged exterior strand.

To remove these failure conditions, orientate the knot in the opposite way --interior strand up, exterior strand down-- and place it high so as to minimize sideways movements.

In Germany, the knot is sometimes called Todesknoten, which means death knot.

== See also ==
- List of bend knots
- List of knots
