= Simple Simon over =

Knot used to join two ropes

Simple Simon Over
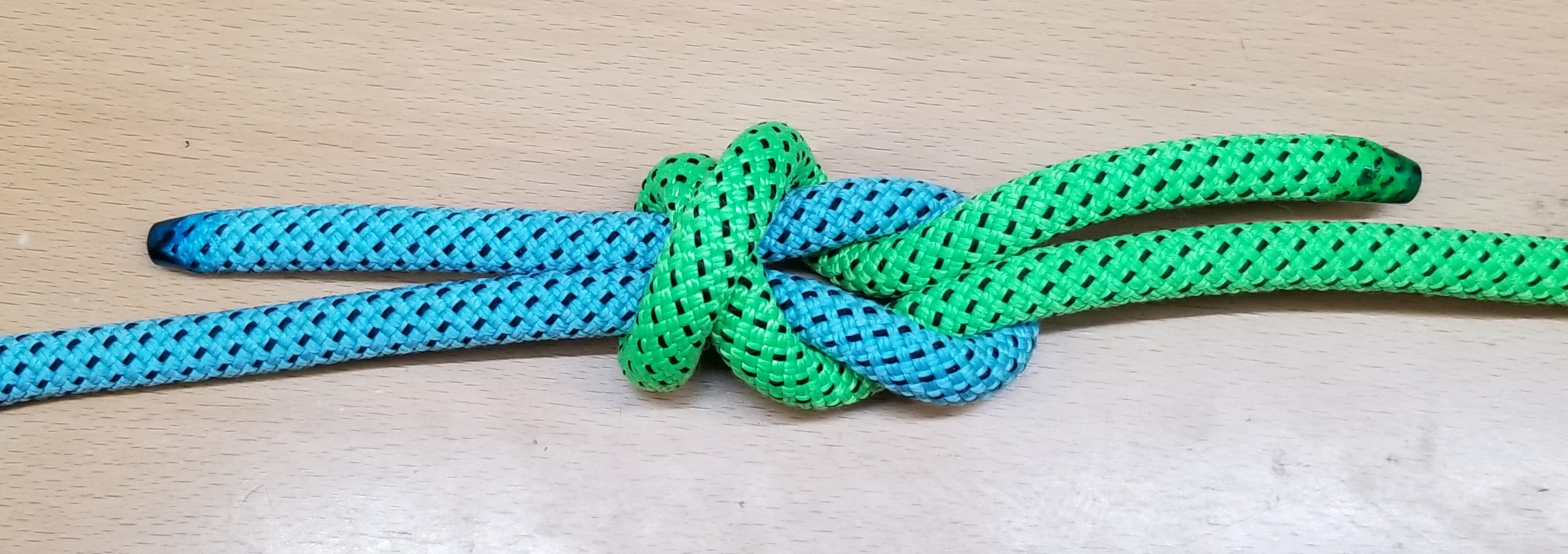
- Category: Bend
- Efficiency: high
- Origin: Harry Asher, published in 1989
- Related: simple Simon under bend, simple Simon symmetric bend, simple Simon double bend, sheet bend
- Releasing: Fair
- Typical use: suitable for dissimilar ropes, works well with synthetic ropes.

The simple Simon over bend is a knot belonging to the category bend. The simple Simon under holds well even with slippery synthetic ropes, but is less secure than the similar simple Simon under.

The difference is just whether the green working end goes over the green standing (loaded) end (Simple Simon over) or under the green standing (loaded) end (simple Simon under).

== Inventor ==
It was invented by Dr. Harry Asher and published in 1989.

When I had decided that the way to try for new bends was to think of the two halves separately, and then decide how to put them together. There seemed to be no better way than to start with the two halfs that make up the famous Sheet bend ... an open loop and a single hitch.

— Dr. Harry Asher: The Alternate Knot Book

== Comparison of Sheet bend, Simple Simon over and Simple Simon under ==
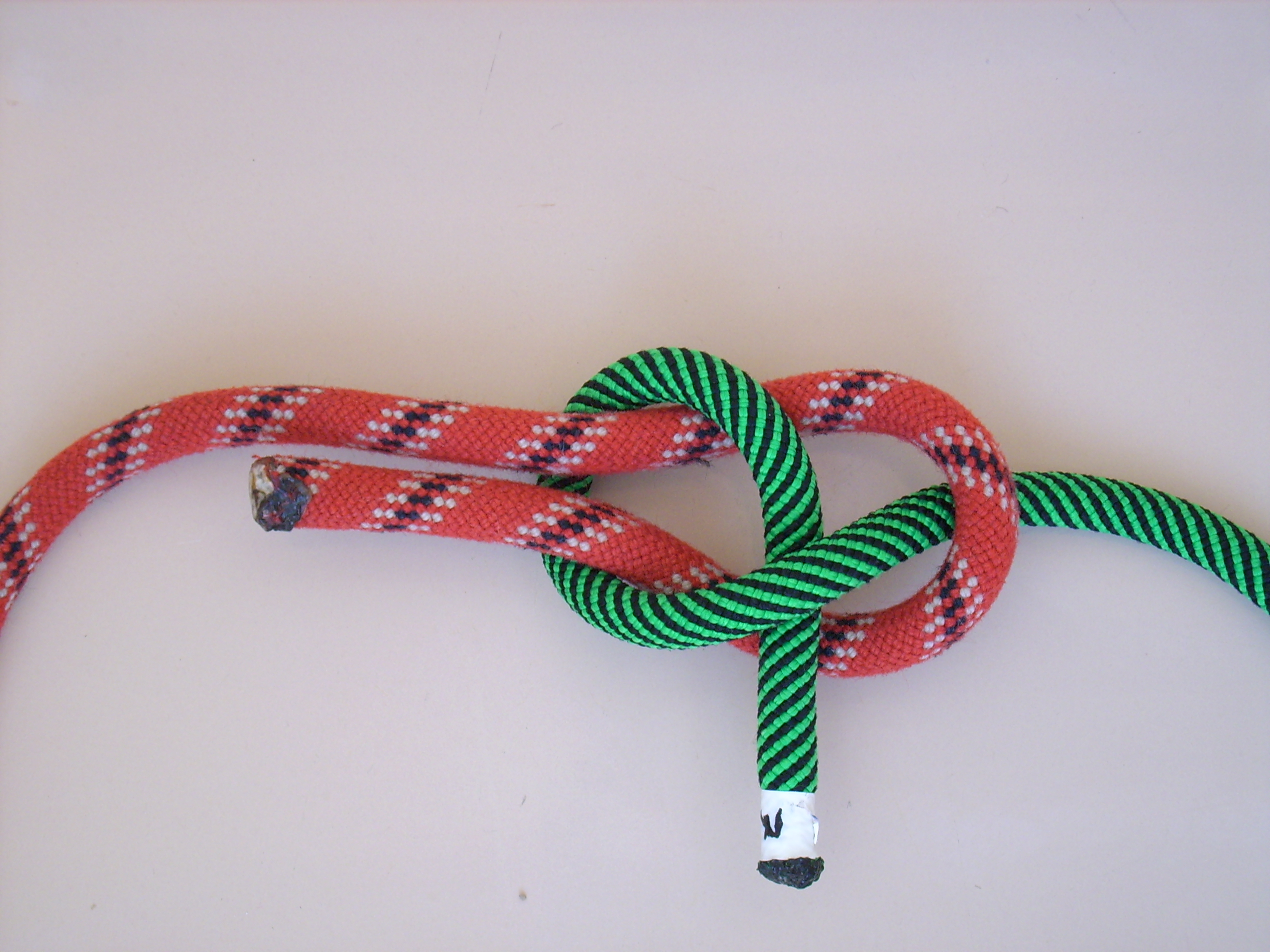
The Sheet bend was the starting point of developing the Simple Simon Over bend.

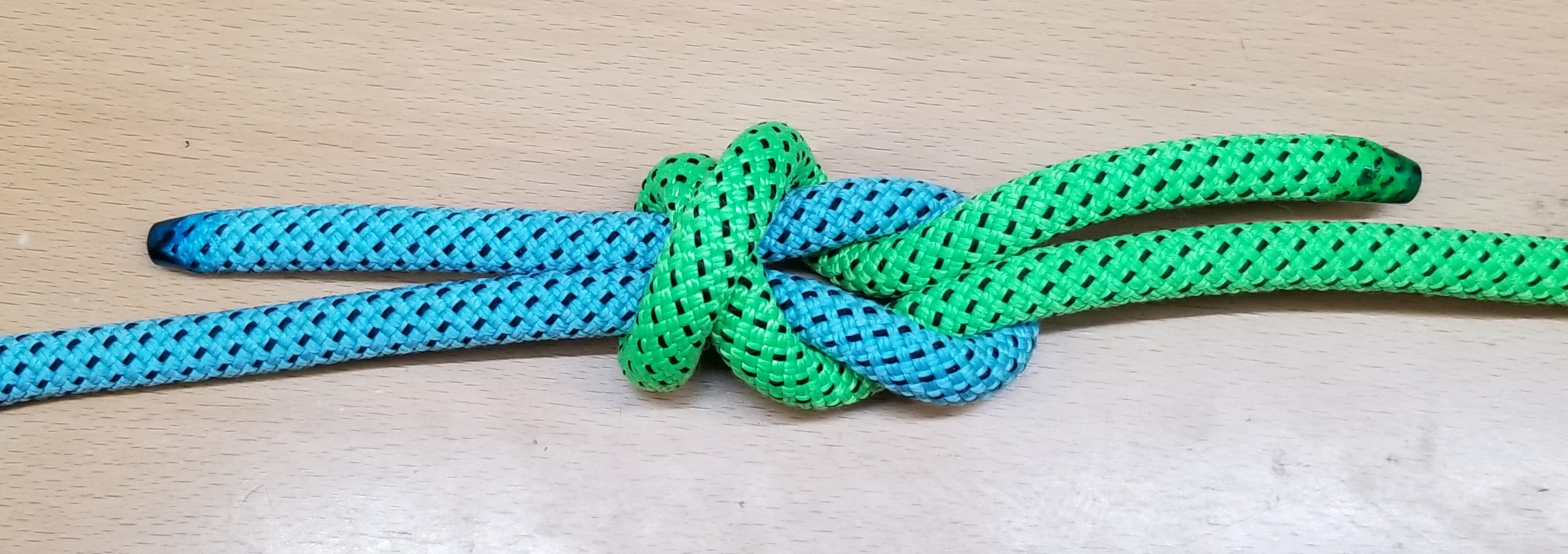
Simple Simon Over.
The working part passes over the standing (loaded) part of the rope.

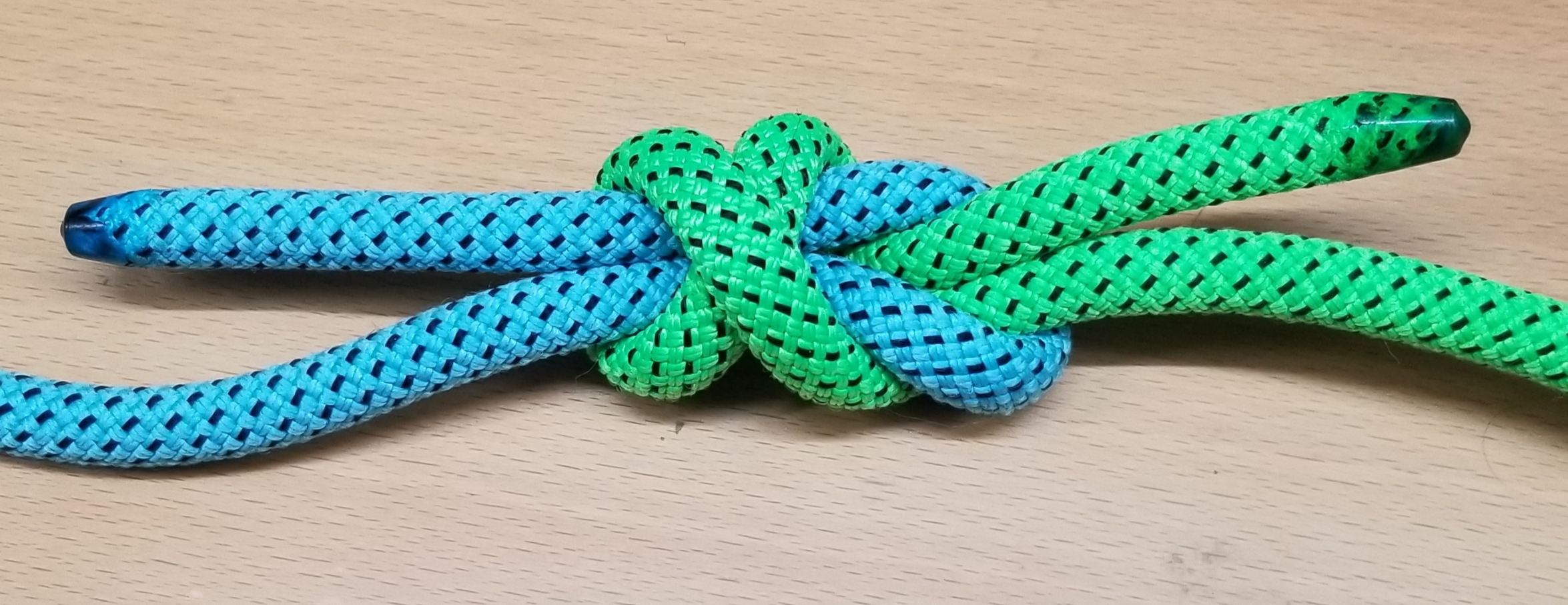
Simple Simon Under.
The working part passes under the standing (loaded) part of the rope.

== Instructions ==
Tie as shown in the images. In the sheet bend, the two running ends should emerge on the same side of the knot.

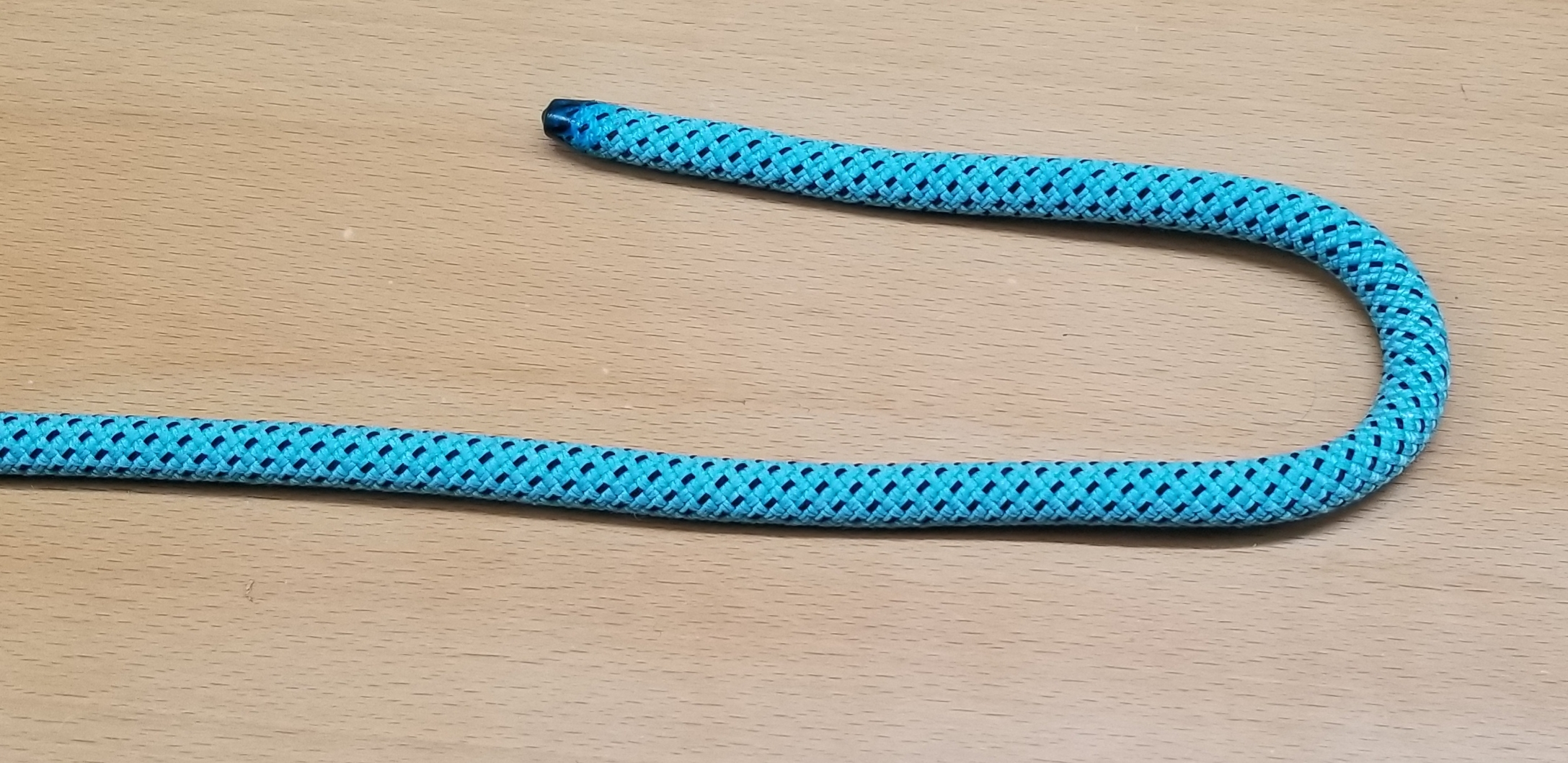
Form a bight with the left rope.

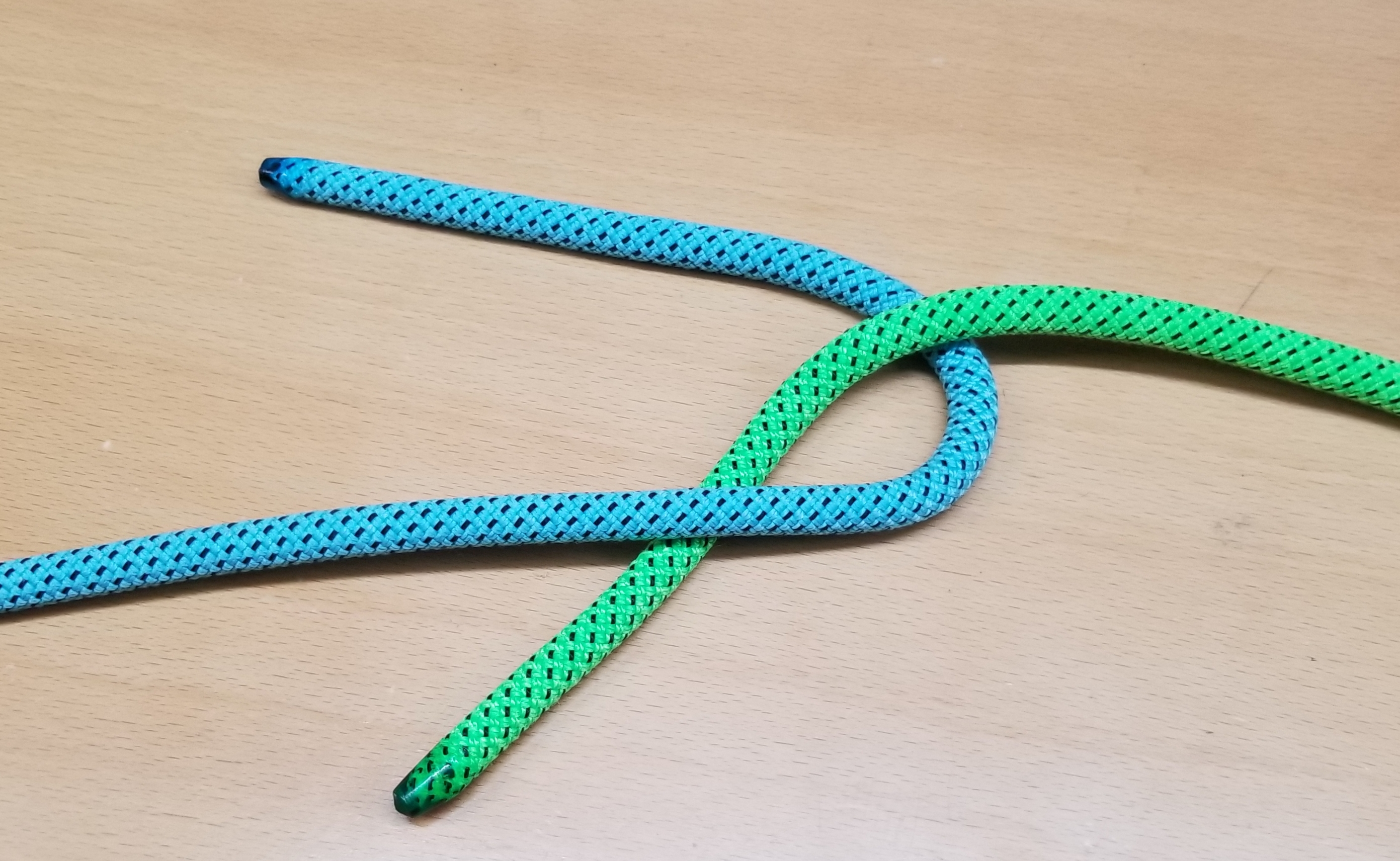
Pass the right rope down through the bight.

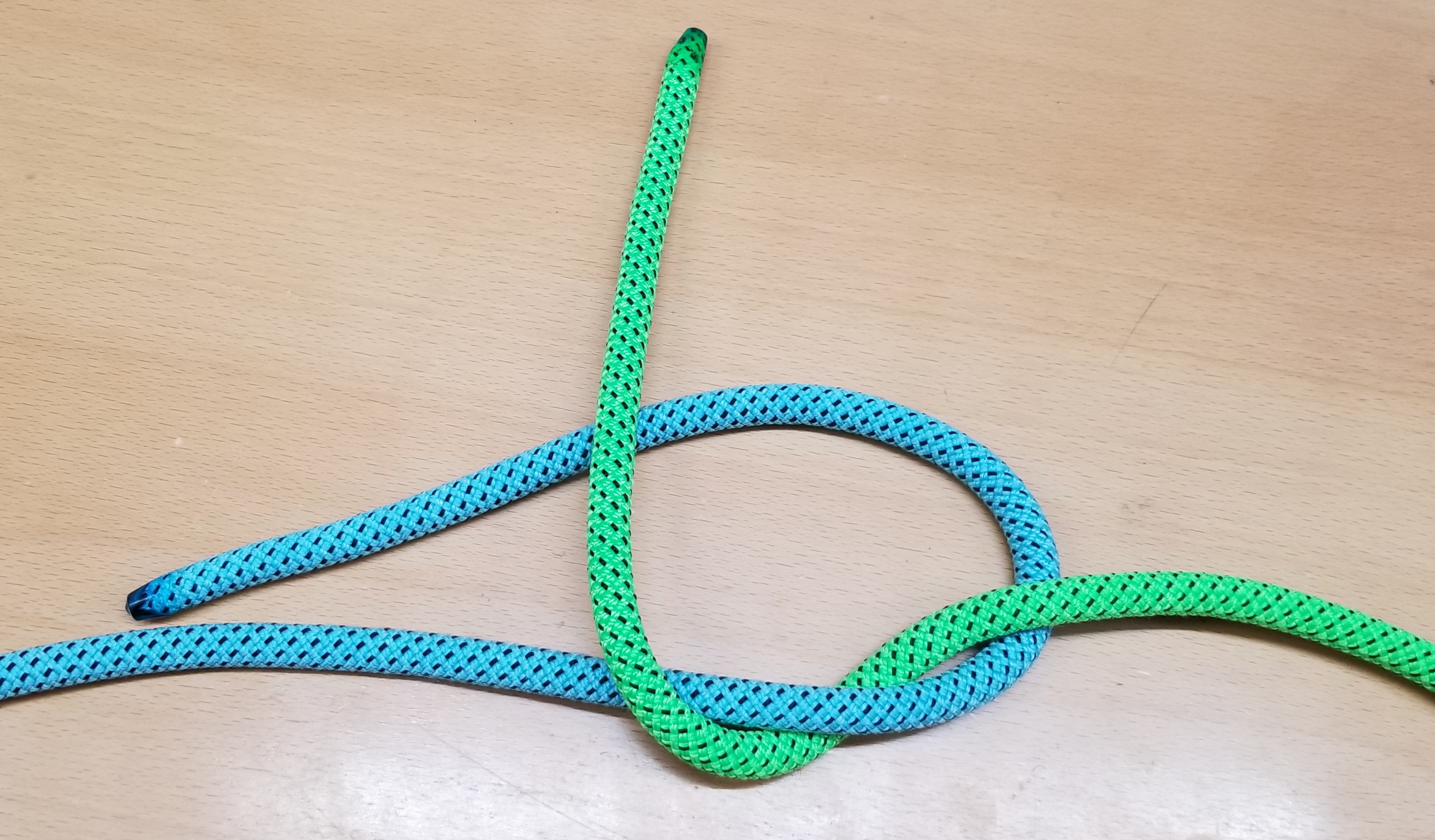
Go above and over the bight.

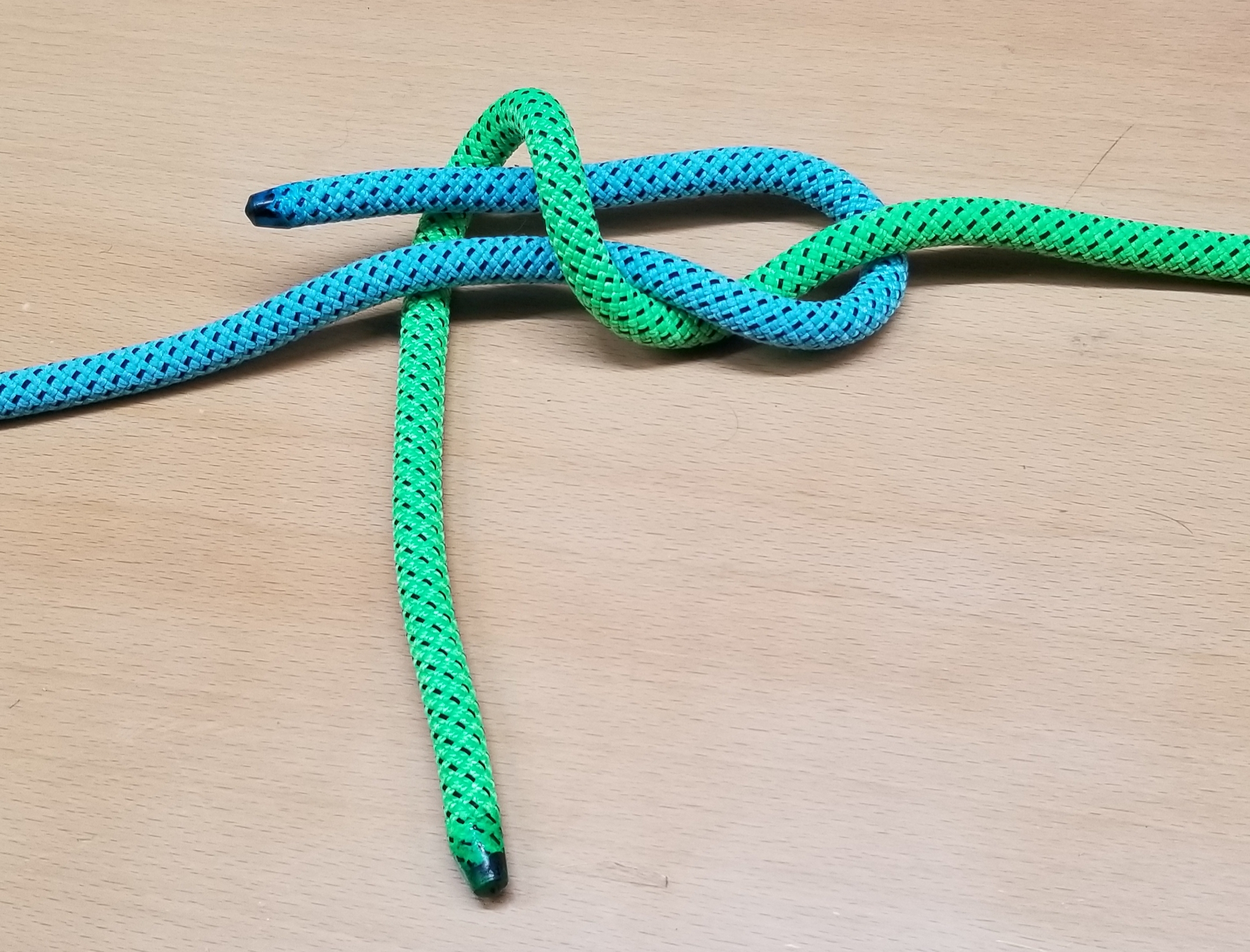
Pass underneath the bight.

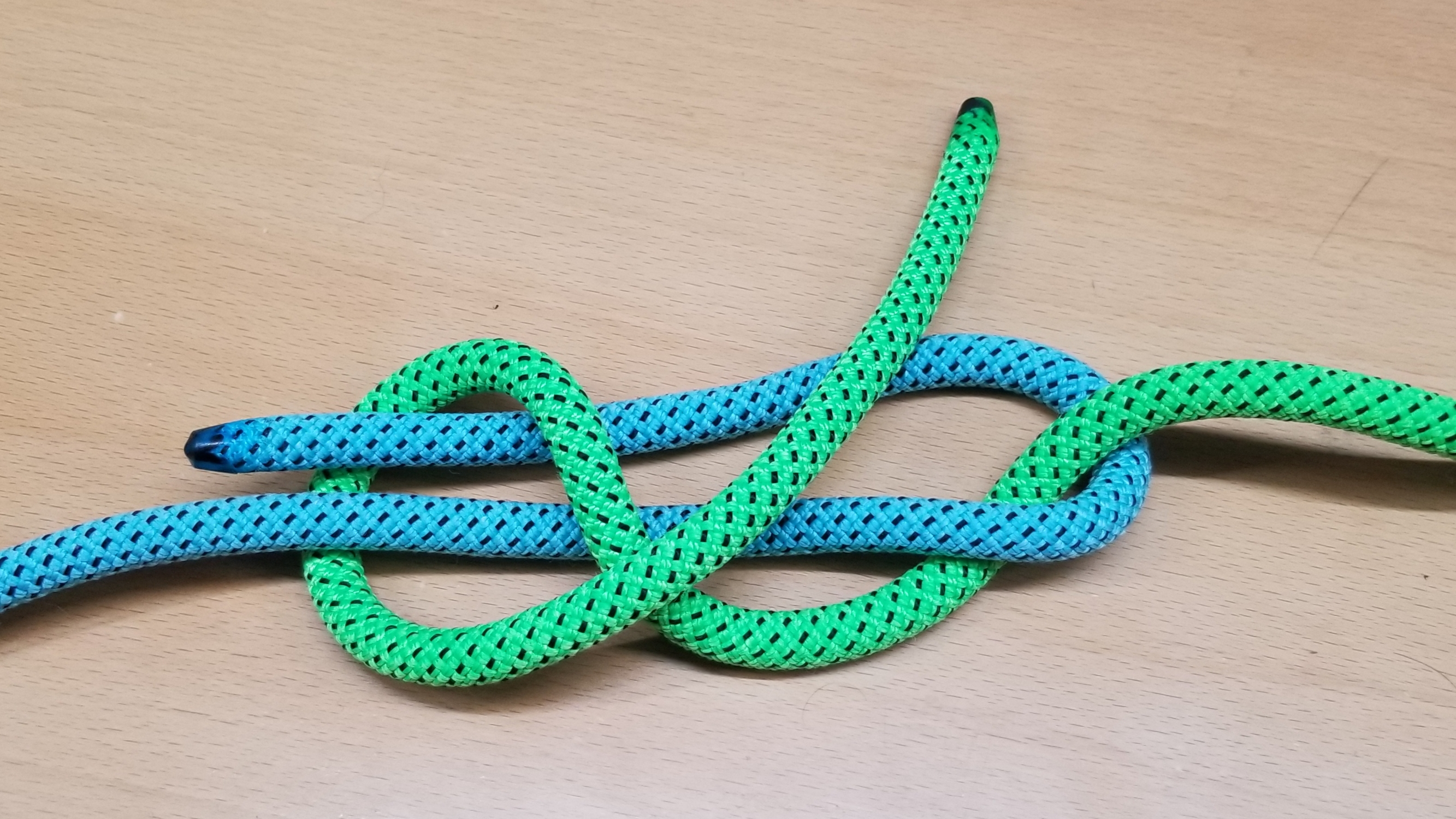
Go over the top, you got an X

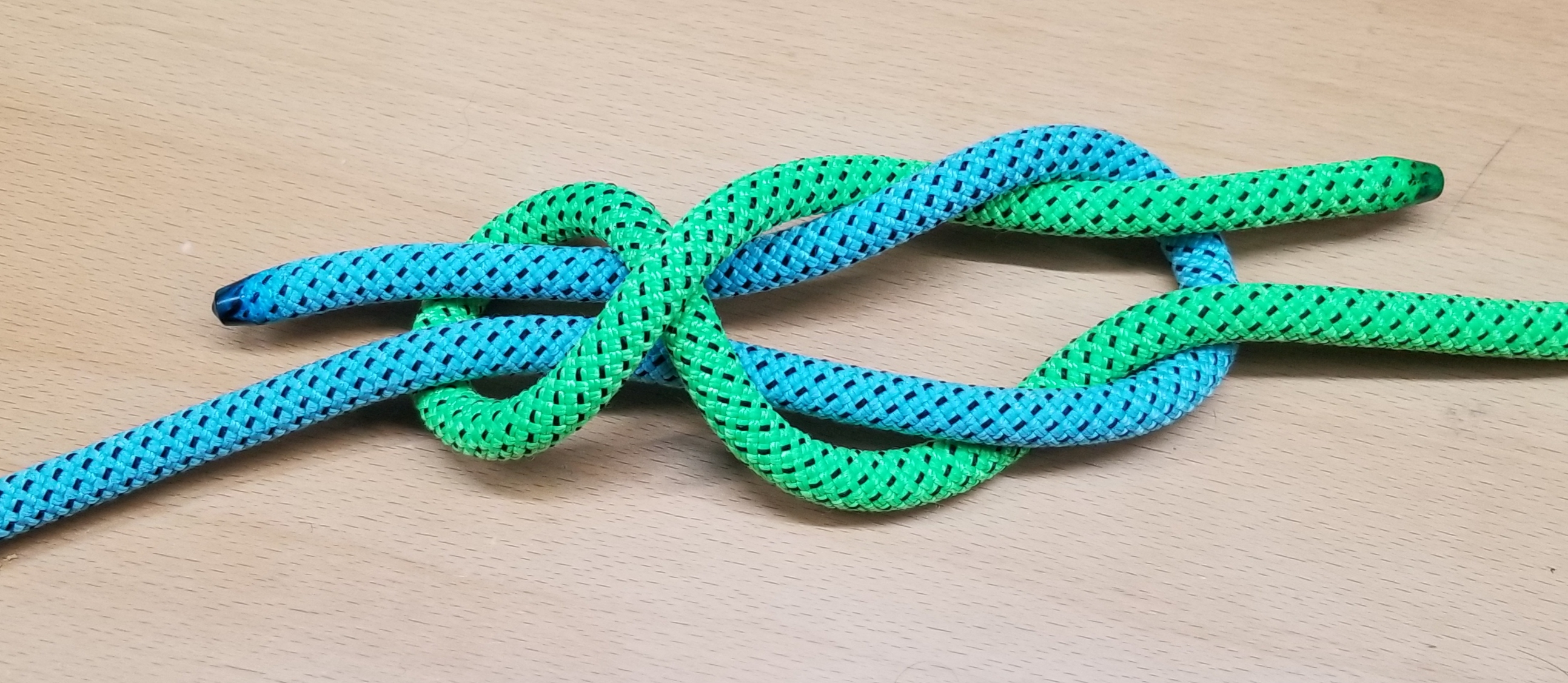
Bring your working end down up through the bight

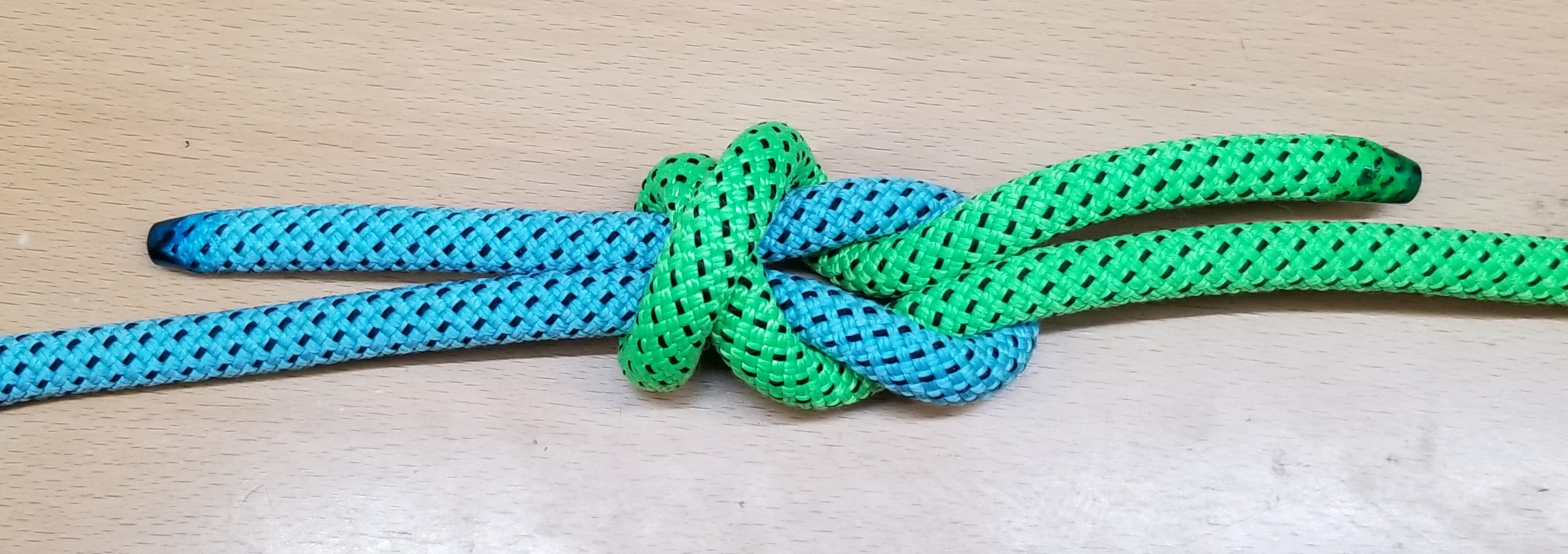
Tighten the bend.

== See also ==
- Knot
- List of bend knots
- List of knots
