= Albright special =

Type of bend knot

Albright Special
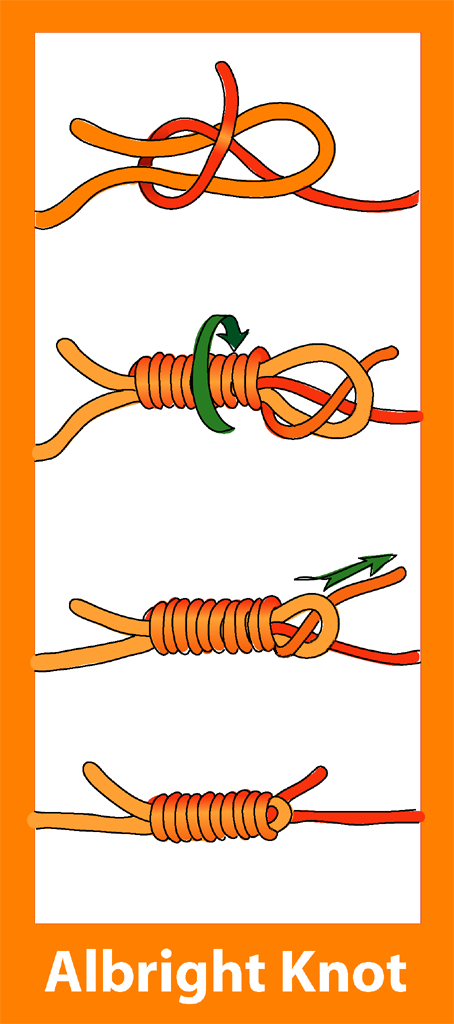
- Names: Albright Special, Albright Knot
- Category: Bend
- Related: Sheet bend
- Releasing: Jamming
- Typical use: Fishing

The Albright special or Albright knot is a bend used in angling. It is a strong knot used to tie two different diameters of line together, for instance to tie monofilament to braid. The Albright is relatively smooth and passes through guides when required. Some anglers coat the knot with a rubber based cement to make it even smoother and more secure.

As this is an angling bend, it is appropriate for use in fishing line such as monofilament, which is finer, more rigid, and more slippery than 'conventional' cords (e.g. braided rope or paracord). Regular knots tied in such cord tend to behave unreliably; hence, one must take additional care when tying many fishing and surgical knots to prevent them from unraveling and spilling. For the Albright special, it is important to wind the turns neatly around the loop of larger line and dress the knot so that each turn sits tight.

For a more general-purpose bend to join more conventional lines of different diameters, see sheet bend (which, again, can be made more secure by adding turns).

== See also ==
- Sheet bend
- Surgical knot
- List of bend knots
- List of knots
