= Nail knot =

Type of knot used in fishing

- Category: Bend
- Typical use: fly fishing

The nail knot, also known as the tube knot or gryp knot, is used in fly fishing to attach the leader to the main fishing line. The knot has been described as "The best known knot for tying a permanent leader butt of monofilament to a fly line" and "the most satisfactory means of attaching a leader butt to a fly line." Fly fishing author Sheridan Anderson recommended coating the nail knot with rubberized glue to prevent the knot from hanging up on the guides of the fishing pole.

The nail knot got its name because a nail or similar object such as a narrow straw is inserted as a guide when tying the knot. To tie the nail knot by hand is widely described as very difficult; therefore some anglers use a nail knot-tying tool. Such a tool can be fashioned from a partially straightened paper clip. Commercial versions of nail knot tools are also available. One example is made by Tie-Fast.

== See also ==
- List of bend knots
- List of knots
