= Bend (knot) =

Type of knot used to join two lengths of rope

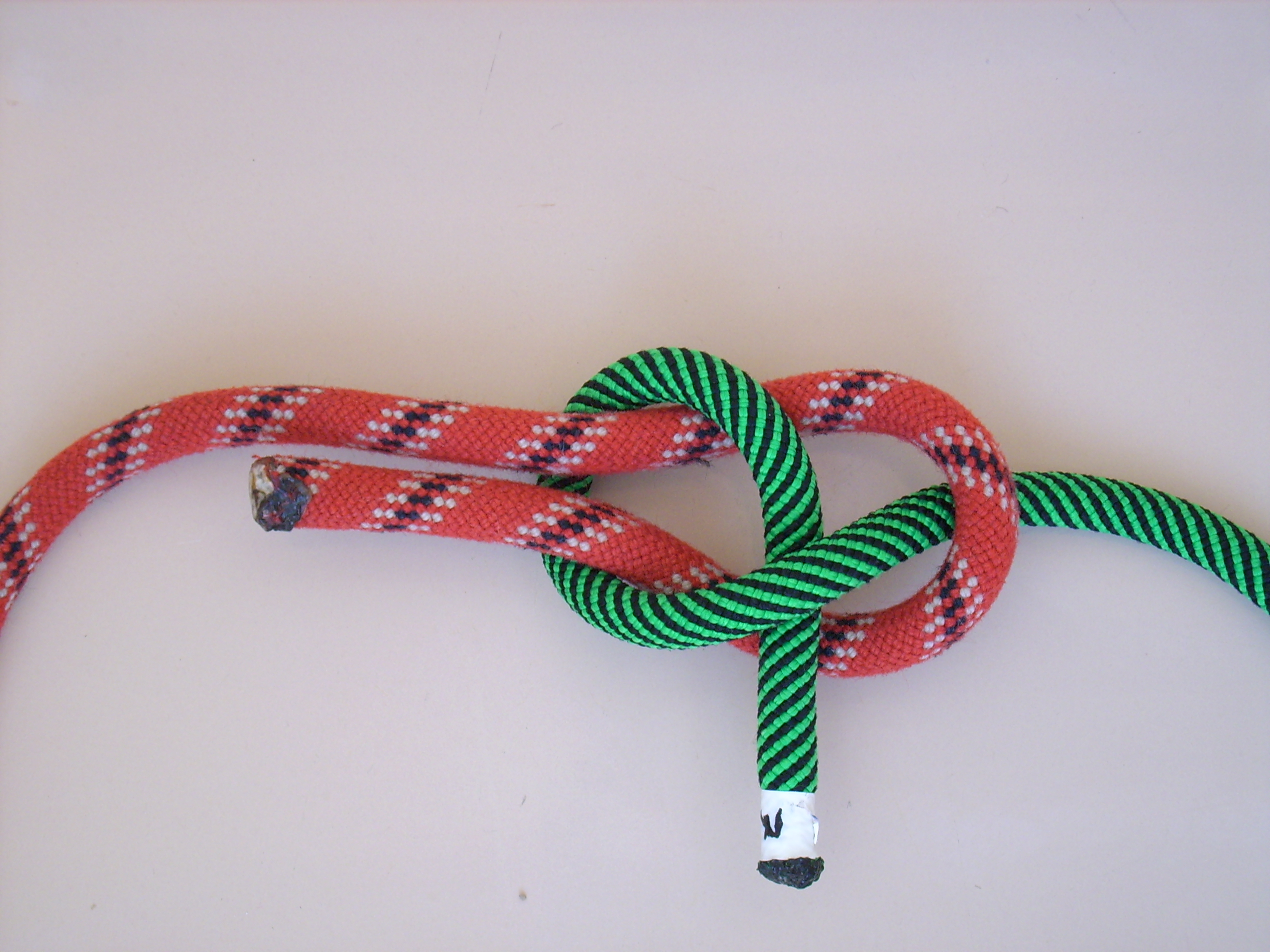
The sheet bend

A bend is a type of knot used to unite two lengths of rope, or two parts of the same rope. Bends are used in a variety of situations, including climbing, sailing, and securing loads. They are classified based on their ability to be tightened or released, their resistance to slipping, and their strength. Some common types include the sheet bend, the double fisherman's knot, and the double figure-eight bend. Bends allow the combined ropes to support weight or transmit force.

== Misuse of reef knot as a bend ==
The common reef knot (square knot) is sometimes mistakenly tied as a bend. When used as a bend rather than a binding knot, the reef knot will capsize under sufficient tension. For this reason, the reef knot is insecure as a bend and as such is not listed as one.

Employed as a binding knot, to reef and furl sails or to tie up parcels, [the reef knot] is invaluable. But employed as a bend [...], the reef knot is probably responsible for more deaths and injuries than have been caused by the failure of all other knots combined.

— Clifford Ashley, Ashley Book of Knots

== Types ==
Knot	Description	ABoK	Image
Adjustable bend	A bend that can be easily lengthened or shortened.		
Albright special	A low-profile bend suitable for monofilament or small-stuff. Mainly used in angling.	N/A	
Ashley's bend	An original bend by Clifford Ashley consisting of interlocking overhand loops.	#1452	
Beer knot	A bend suitable for tubular webbing. Its most common application is in slings used in rock climbing.	N/A	
Blood knot	A low-profile bend most usefully employed for joining sections of monofilament nylon line while maintaining a high portion of the line's inherent strength.	#295 #345 #1413	
Butterfly bend (Alpine butterfly bend)	A bend analogue of the butterfly loop.	N/A	
Carrick bend	A bend that is particularly appropriate for very heavy rope or cable that is too large and stiff to be easily formed into other common bends.	#1428 #1439	
Fisherman's knot Double fisherman's knot Triple fisherman's knot	A symmetrical bend tied with two overhand knots around the standing end of the other line. A variation of the fisherman's knot consisting of two double overhands. A variation of the fisherman's knot consisting of triple overhands.	#294 #498 #1414 #1415	
Flemish bend	A bend based on the figure-eight knot.	#1411	
Harness bend	A bend that can be pulled taut before securing.	#1474	
Heaving line bend	A bend suitable for tying smaller lines to larger lines, such as in attaching playing strings to the thick silk eyes of the anchorage knot.	#1463	
Hunter's bend	A bend consisting of two interlocking overhand knots.	#1425A	
Nail knot	A bend used in fly fishing to join lines of different diameters. It is useful but difficult to tie by hand.	N/A	
One-sided overhand bend	A bend formed by tying a single overhand knot in two lines facing the same direction.	#1410	
Racking bend	A bend for joining lines of different diameters. It is more secure than the heaving line bend or sheet bend due to the woven figure-eight knot "rackings".	#1462	
Reever Knot	A secure and compact bend.	N/A	
Sheet bend	A common bend for joining lines of different diameters.	#1 #66 #1431	
Shroud knot	A multi-strand bend used to join two ends of laid (or twisted) rope together.	#1565	
Simple Simon over	A bend for joining two lines together	N/A	
Simple Simon under	A bend that is more secure than the similar Simple Simon over.	N/A	
Single carrick bend		N/A	
Surgeon's knot	A bend commonly employed in small-stuff. It can be pulled taut before securing.	#416 #463 #1209	
True lover's knot	A bend consisting of interlocking overhand knots.	#798 #1038 #1143 #1414 #2418 #2301 #2394 #2420 #2421 #2423 #2424 #2425 #2425 #2426	
Water knot	A bend suitable for flat material such as leather or webbing.	#296 #343 #1412	
Zeppelin bend	A bend consisting of interlocking overhand knots. It is similar to the hunter's bend but offers advantages in that it is jam resistant and easy to untie.	N/A	

== See also ==
- List of knot terminology
- Binding knot
- Rope splicing
- Whipping knot

== Bibliography ==
- Verrill, A. Hyatt (2004). Knots, Splices and Rope Work : A Practical Treatise. Project Gutenberg. (also available in Gutenberg Project website)
