= Simple Simon under =

Knot used to join two ropes

Simple Simon Under
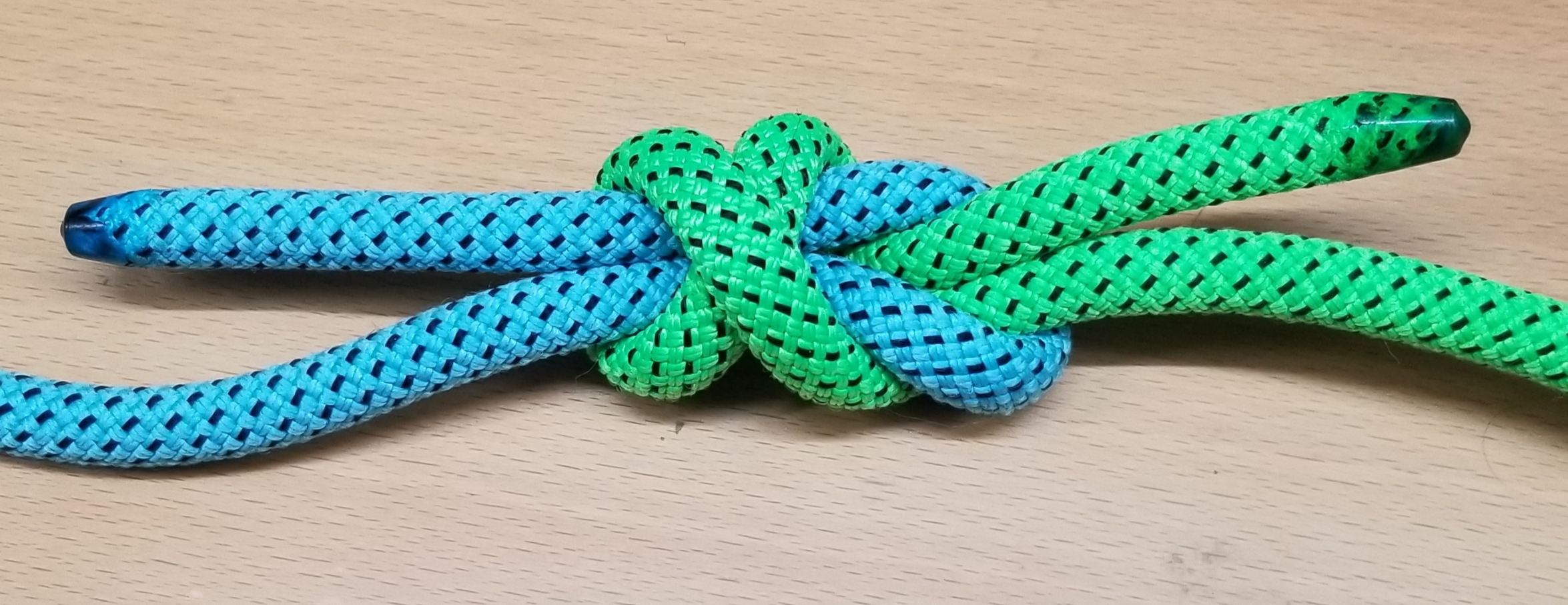
- Category: Bend
- Efficiency: high
- Origin: Harry Asher, published in 1989
- Related: simple Simon over bend, simple Simon symmetric bend, simple Simon double bend
- Releasing: Fair
- Typical use: suitable for dissimilar ropes, works well with synthetic ropes.

The simple Simon under bend is a knot belonging to the category bend. It was invented by Harry Asher. It is more secure than the similar Simple Simon over and more effective with quite large differences in thickness of the two ropes.

The simple Simon under holds well even with different sized ropes, or slippery synthetic ropes.

== Comparison of Sheet bend, Simple Simon over and Simple Simon under ==
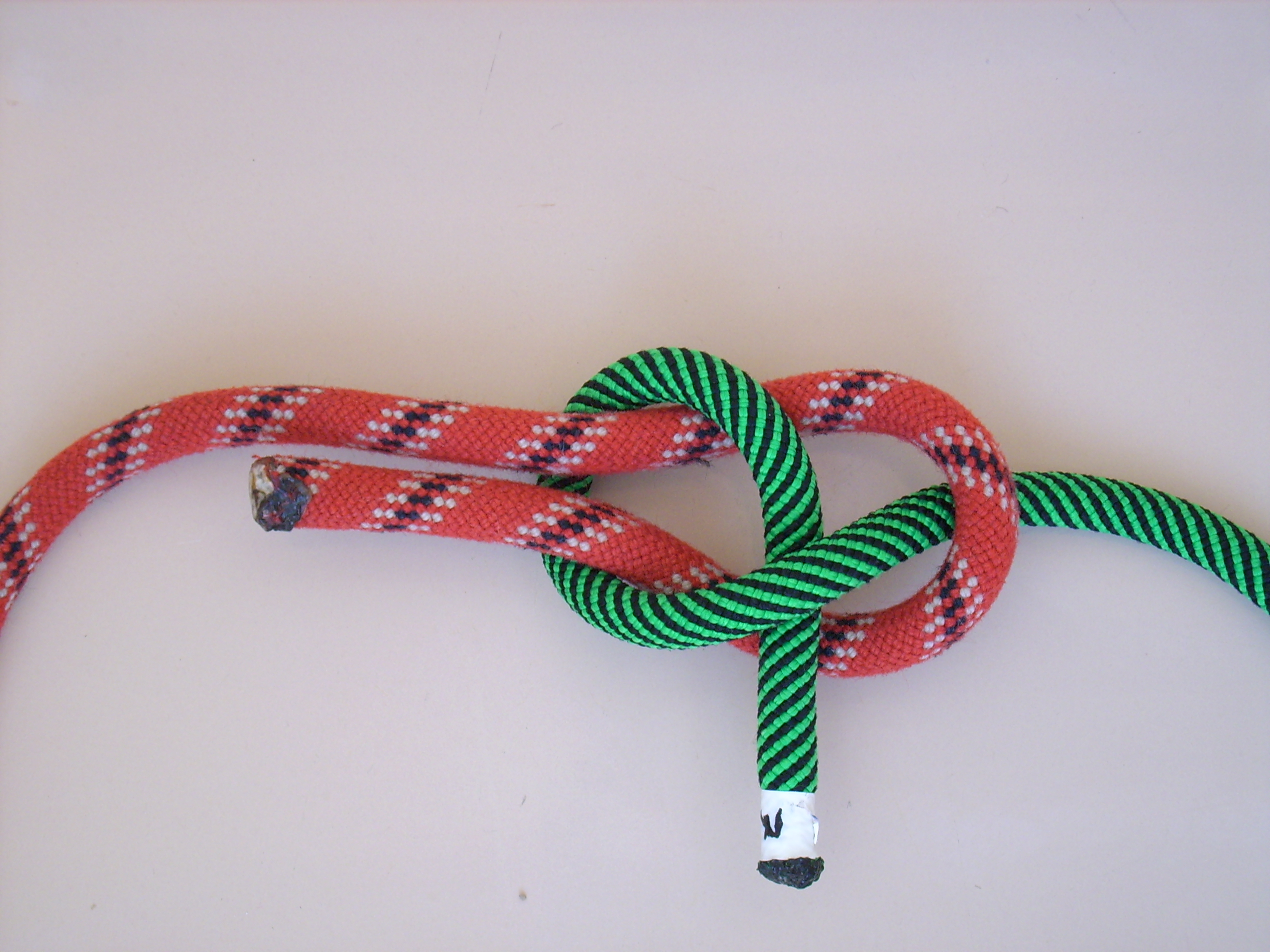
The Sheet bend was the starting point of developing the Simple Simon over bend.

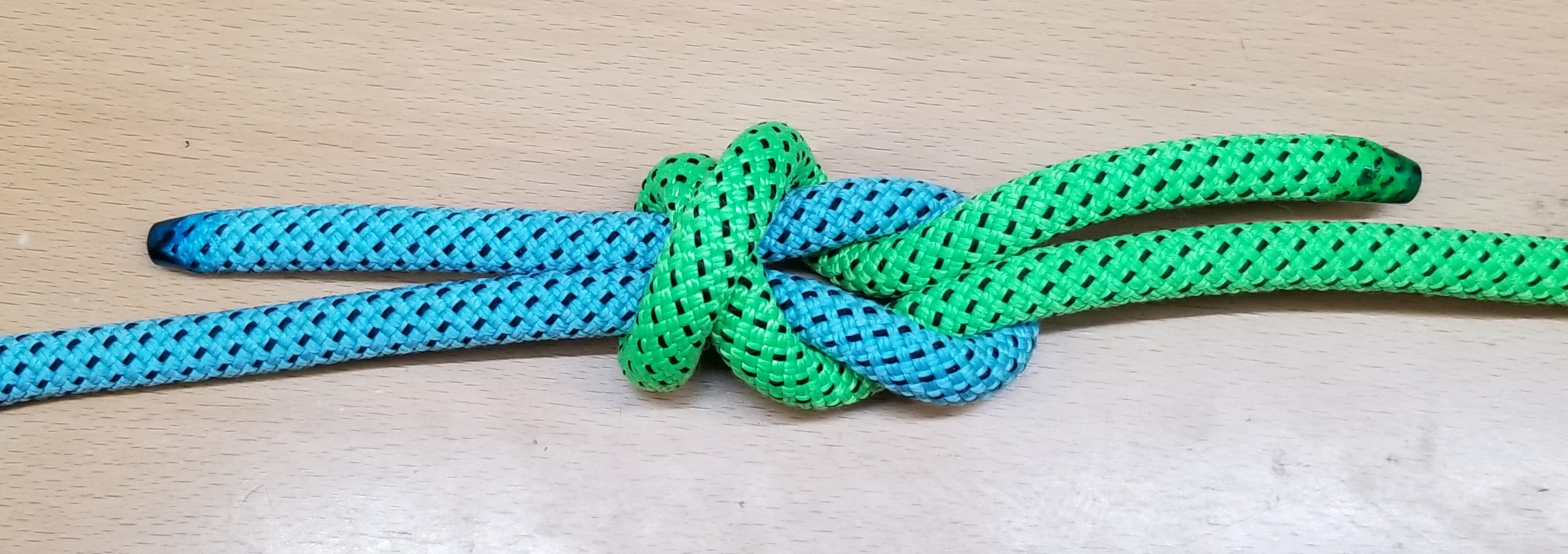
Simple Simon Over.
The working part passes over the standing (loaded) part of the rope.

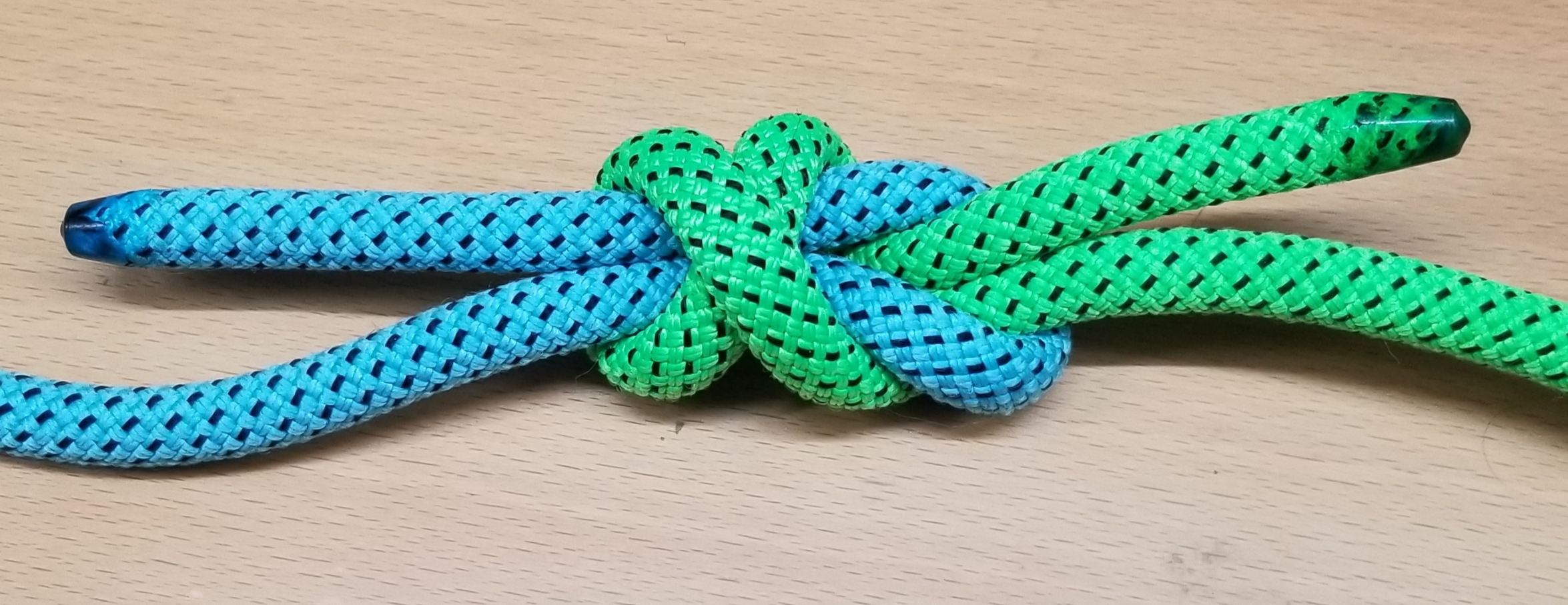
Simple Simon Under.
The working part passes under the standing (loaded) part of the rope.

== Instructions ==
Tie as shown in the images. Note that, as in the sheet bend, the two running ends should emerge on the same side of the knot.

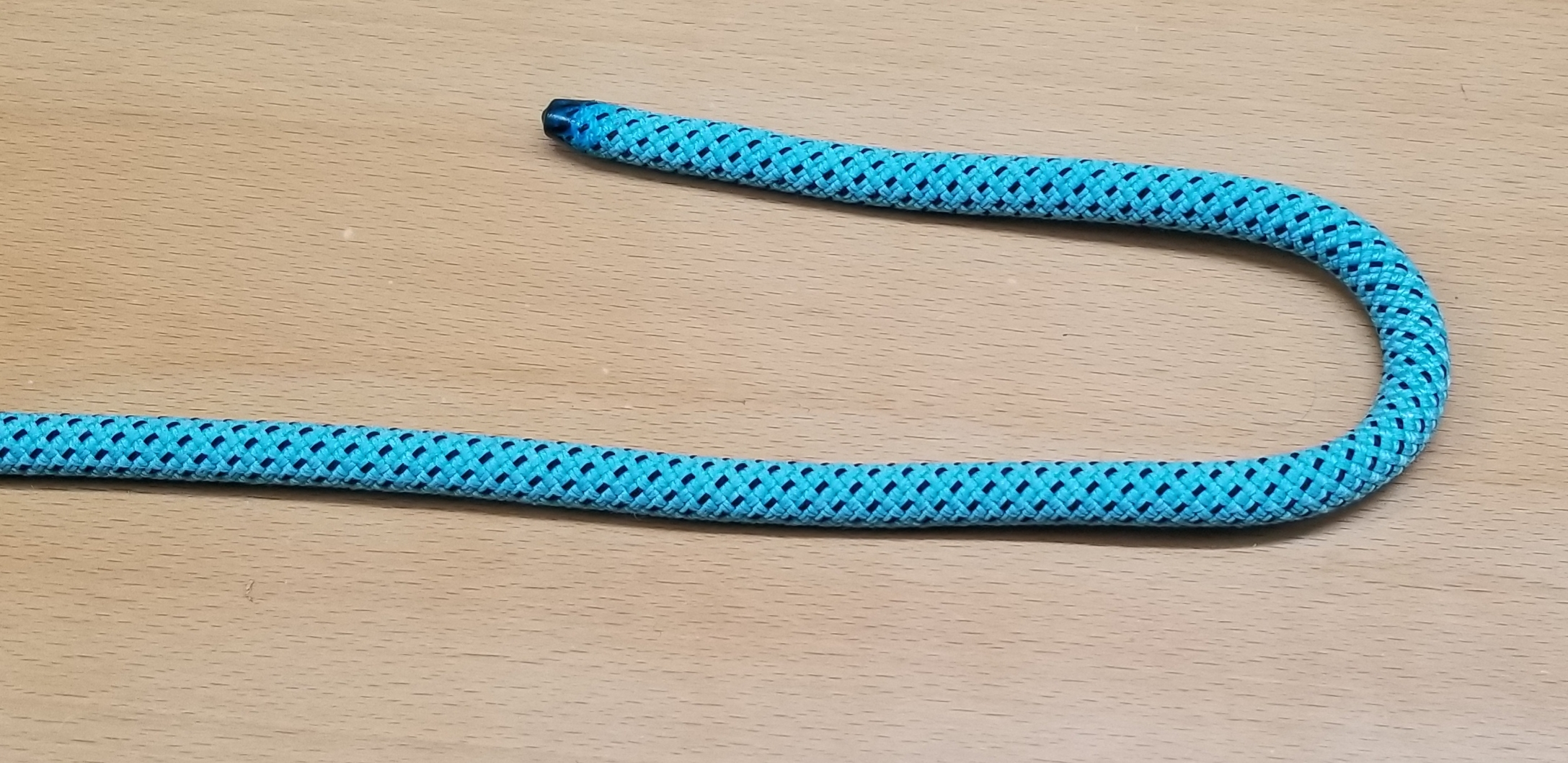
Form a bight with the left rope.

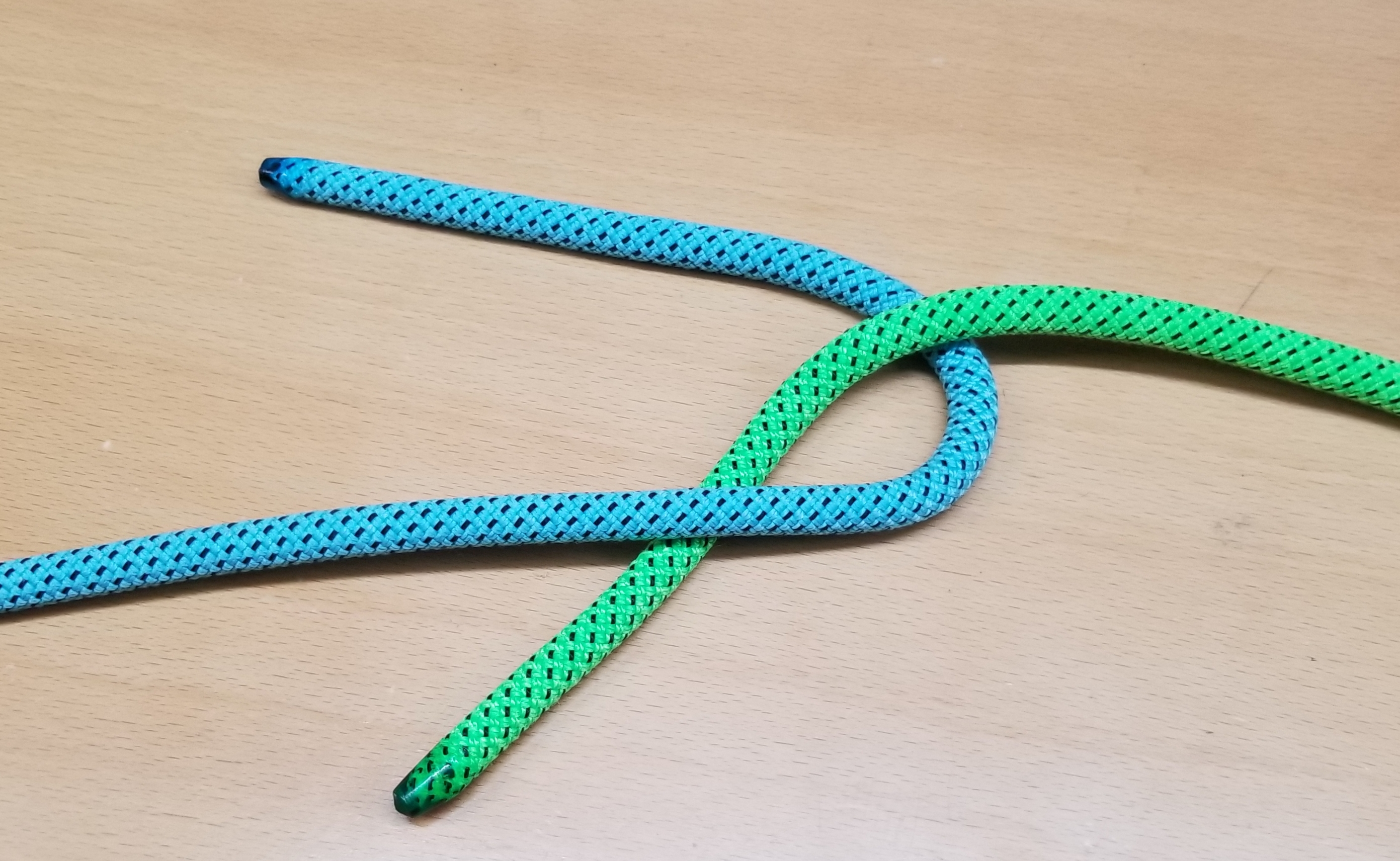
Pass the right rope down through the bight.

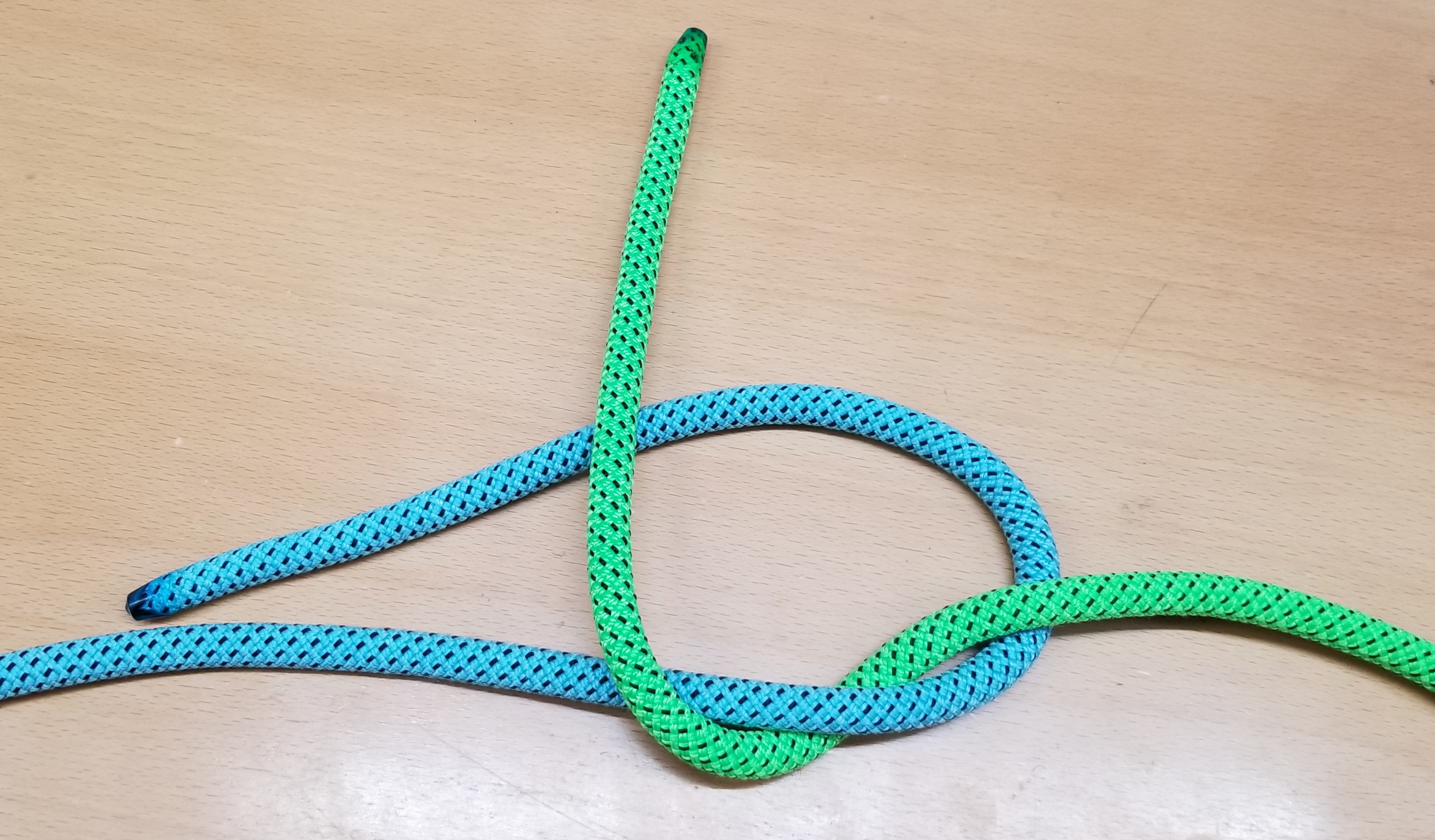
Go underneath of the working end over the bight.

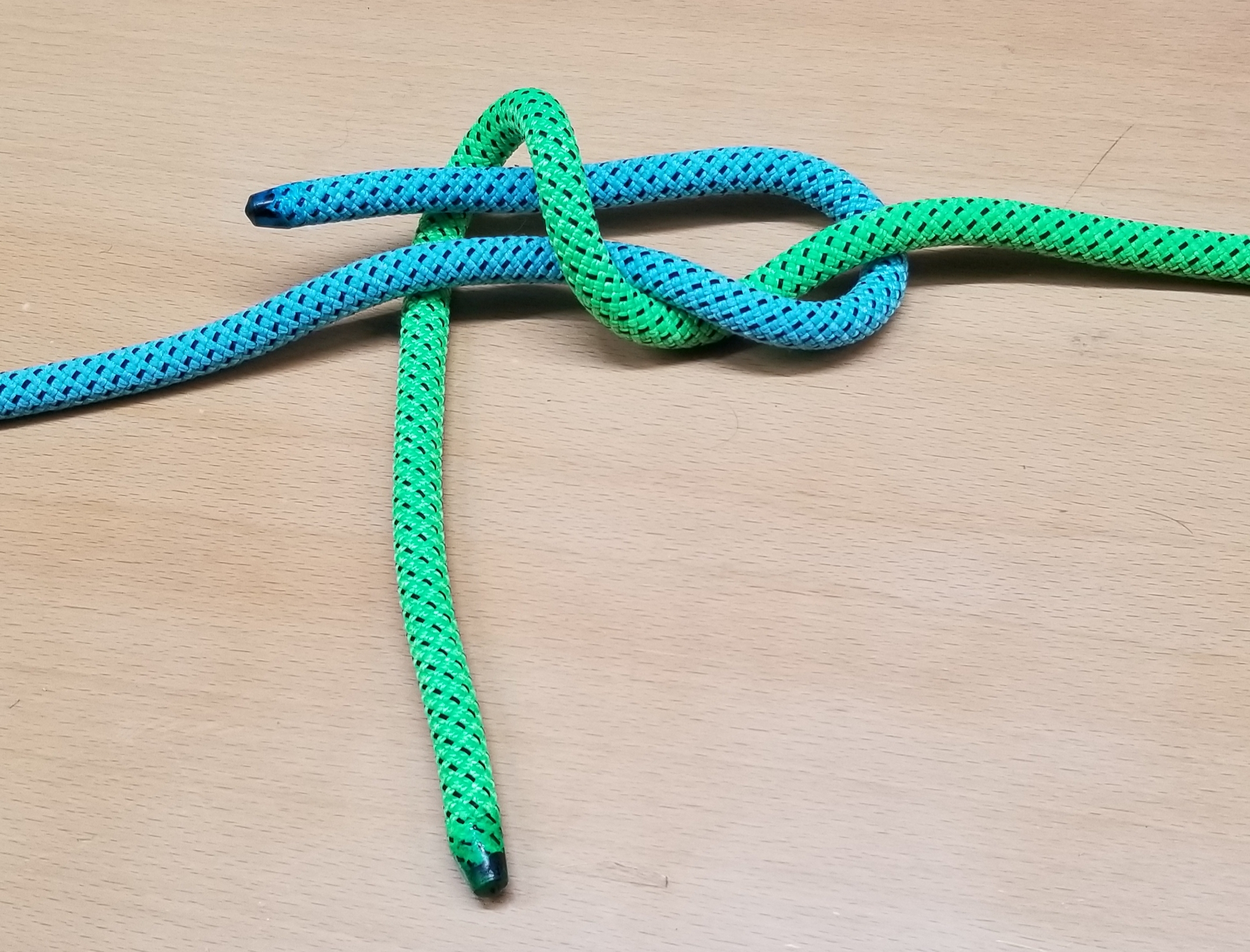
Pass underneath the bight.

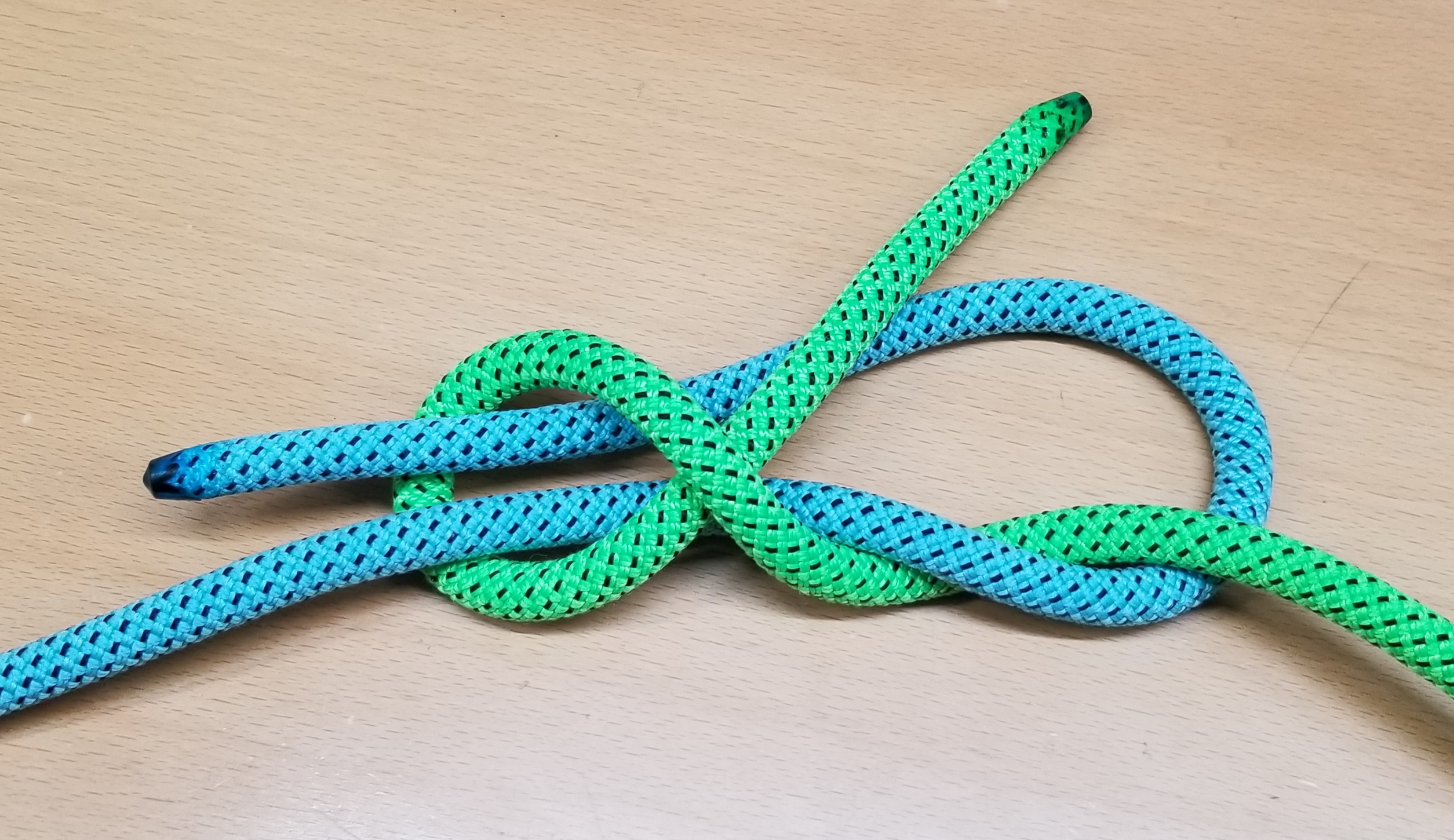
The working part passes beneath the standing (loaded) part of the right, you got an X.

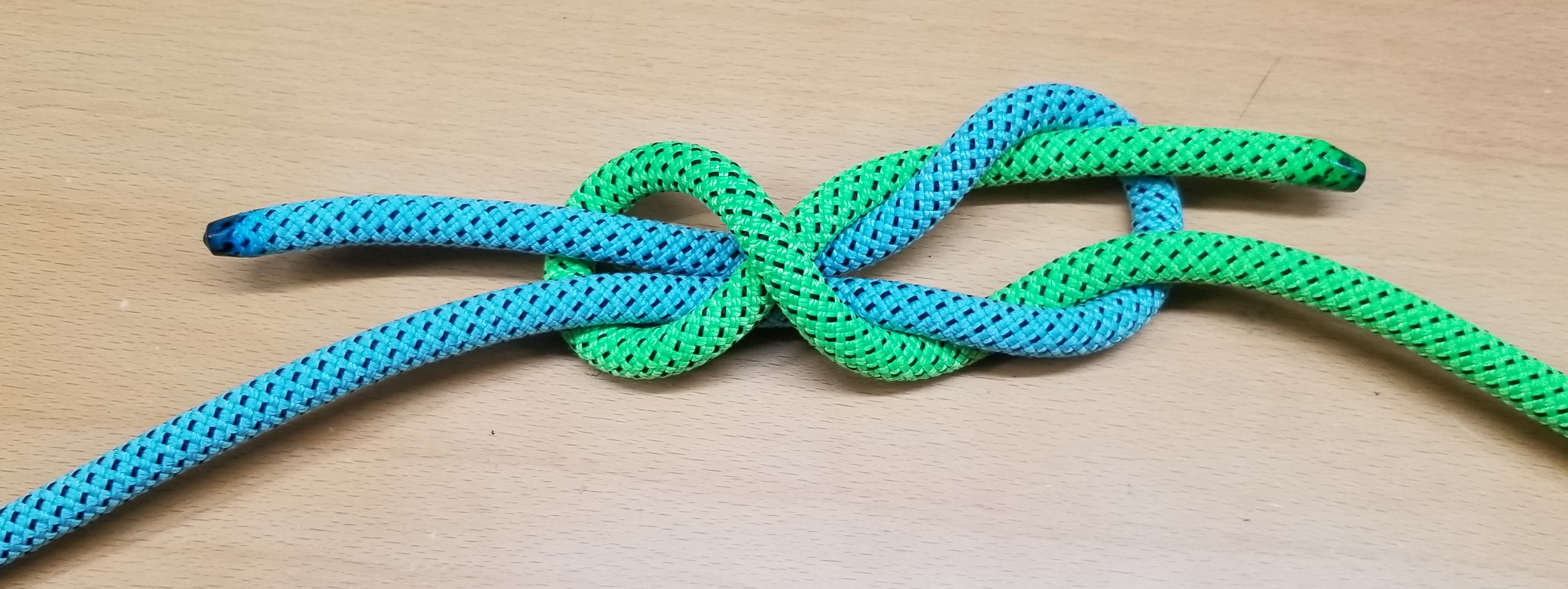
Bring your working end down up through the bight

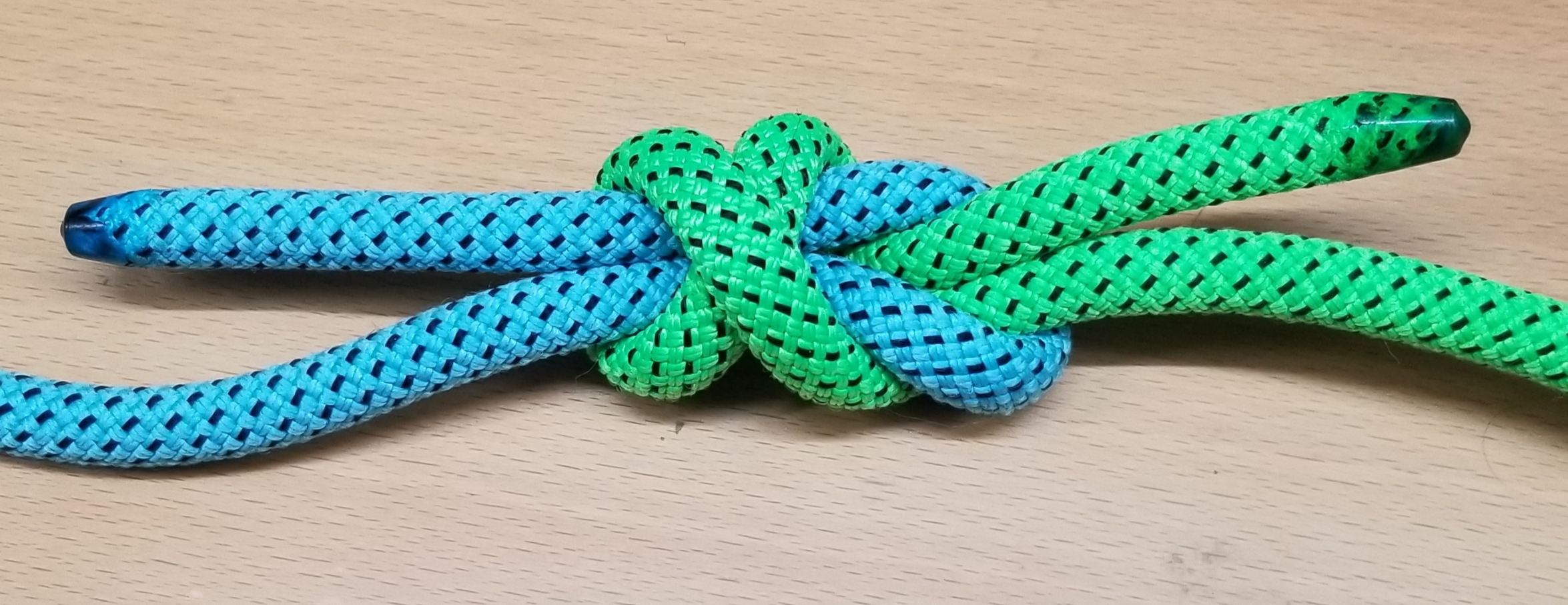
Tighten the bend.

== See also ==
- Knot
- List of bend knots
- List of knots
