= Flemish bend =

Type of knot

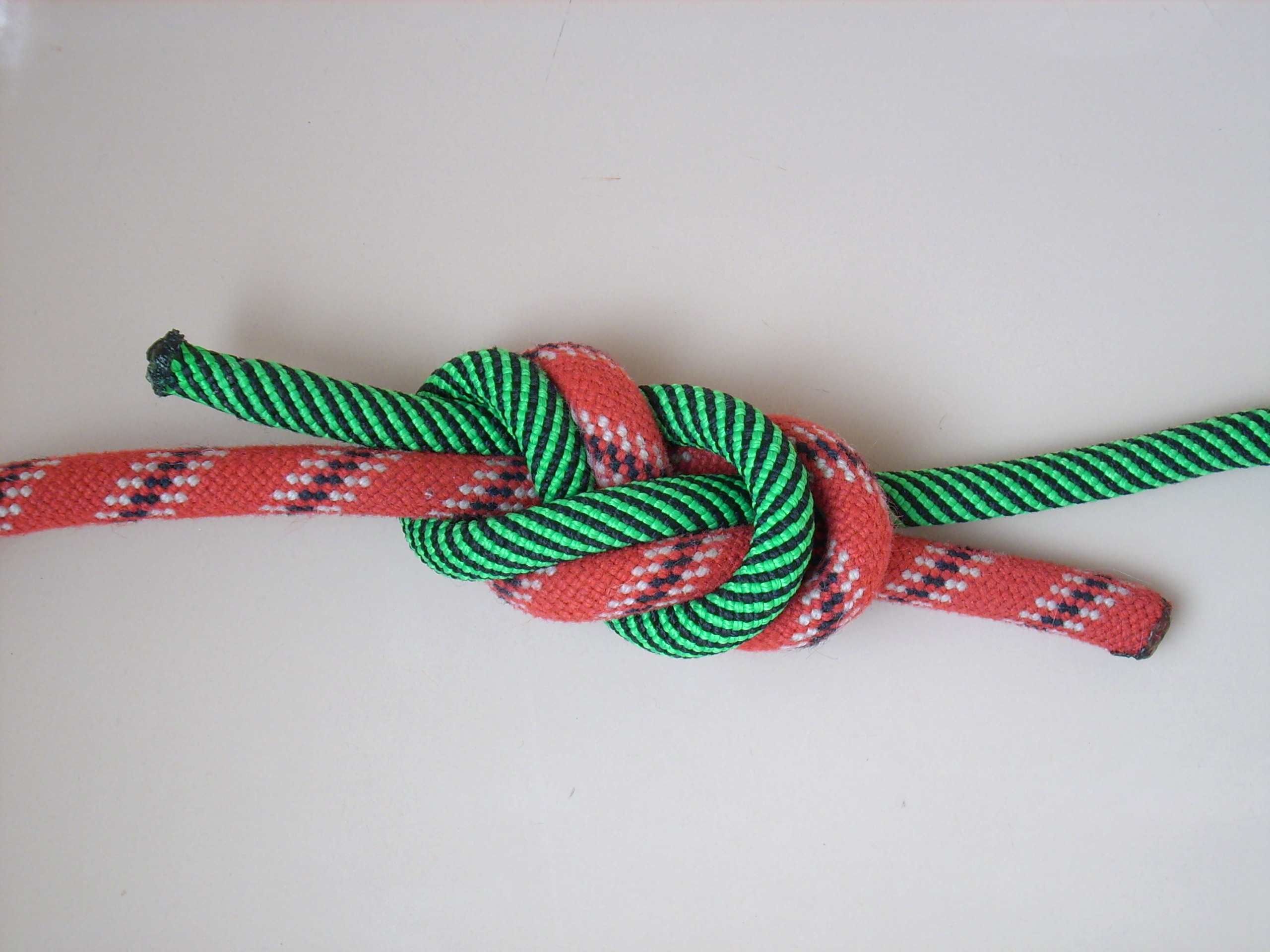
- Names: Flemish bend, Figure 8 bend, Rewoven Figure 8 bend, Double figure 8 bend
- Category: Bend
- Related: Figure-eight knot
- Releasing: Jamming
- Typical use: Climbing, search and rescue operations, DIY projects
- ABoK: #1411

The Flemish bend, also known as a figure eight bend, a rewoven figure eight, is a knot for joining two ropes of roughly similar size.

A loose figure-eight knot is tied in the end of one rope. The second rope is now threaded backwards parallel to the first rope. When properly dressed, the two strands do not cross each other.

Although fairly secure, it is susceptible to jamming. If tied, dressed and stressed properly it does not need "stopper" or "safety" knots.

The Flemish bend, also called figure-eight bend, is often given in knot monographs but is seldom used. It is bulky and bothersome to tie, and not to be preferred to the following knot [ water knot ], which is made in a similar manner.

— The Ashley Book of Knots

== See also ==
- List of bend knots
- List of knots
