= Offset overhand bend =

Knot used to join two ropes together

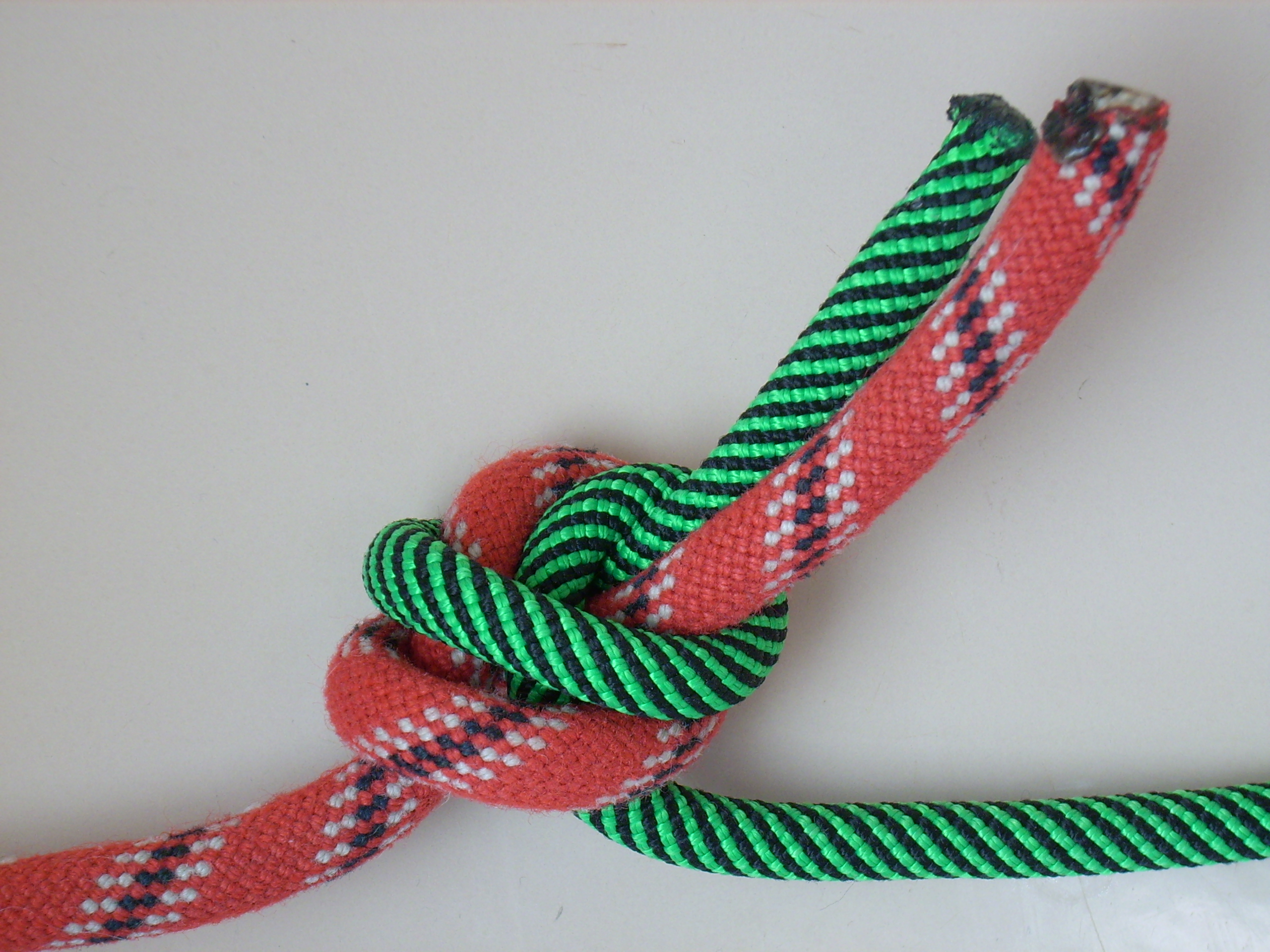
- Names: Offset overhand bend, European Death knot (EDK), offset water knot, flat overhand bend, thumb knot, thumb bend, Creeler's knot, openhand knot
- Category: Bend
- Origin: Ancient
- Related: Overhand knot, water knot
- Releasing: Jamming
- Typical use: sewing, weaving, baling, climbing, rappelling
- ABoK: 246, 359, 1236, 1410, 1557, 1558, 3789

The offset overhand bend (OOB, ABoK No. 1410) is a knot used to join two ropes together end-to-end. It is formed by holding two rope ends next to each other and tying an overhand knot in them as if they were a single line. Due to its common use in several fields, this bend has become known by many names, such as thumb knot, openhand knot, one-sided overhand knot or flat overhand bend (FOB), though the terms "one-sided" and "flat" are considered incorrect.

== Geometry ==
The term 'offset' refers to the knot core being displaced from the axis of tension. This geometry allows the knot to more easily translate around an edge - particularly a 90 degree edge.

== Uses ==
Long used by weavers to join the ends of yarn, the offset water knot is very old. It was one of the knots likely identified among the possessions of Ötzi the Iceman, who dates from 3300 BC.

The knot is also tied in a slipped form by mechanical balers to bind straw and hay, but this bend is not practical to use as a binding knot when tied by hand.

=== In climbing and mountaineering ===
For mountaineers/climbers, there tends to be a strong preference for using knots that are perceived to be relatively easy to tie - even when fatigued or in a less than optimal frame of mind - and so #1410 (Offset overhand bend) is favored. Climbers/canyoners need to retrieve their ropes after an abseil/rappel descent. The ability to retrieve ropes after an abseil descent is crucial - and in many cases, two ropes need to be joined to increase the distance that can be descended in one 'pitch'. The resulting knot that unites the two ropes needs be secure and stable, have a small footprint, and be resistant to jamming.

There is controversy over its safety, as it can fail by capsizing under high loads, and some American climbers refer to it as the European death knot, abbreviated to EDK, with some sources recommending against its use. Failure of this knot has been implicated in some accidents and near-misses - although post accident retrieval of ropes for examination are usually inconclusive because the ropes have separated (and hence there is no remnant knot to examine).

Many sources argue that the name 'EDK' is a misnomer, and the knot is safe for abseiling / rappelling, since this does not generate as high forces as a fall. The nominal load during abseiling/rappelling is one person - generally around 1.0kN (approximately 100kg). If the system is configured so the ropes are doubled through the anchor, the joining knot will only be subjected to 50% of the load (ie approximately 0.5kN) - which is well below the instability threshold. With due diligence given to dressing and setting the knot, the risk of capsizing is highly unlikely.

Several sources recommend adding a second overhand as close as possible to the first (a stacked overhand or double overhand) for most situations, which maintains most of the benefits, while preventing it from capsizing. This doubles the overall footprint of the knot, which might increase its likelihood of getting stuck in cracks, but does not harm its ability to pass over edges. There are several different choices of offset knots - all offering varying levels of advantages/disadvantages. Another option is wrapping the strands a second time before passing the tail through (a two-rope version of ABoK #516, also called a double overhand or flat doubled overhand bend) but again, it increases the overall footprint.

Easily formed in most lines, the offset overhand bend is jam resistant at nominal loads of one person (approximately 100kg). In EN892 climbing ropes, the jamming threshold is thought to be in the vicinity of 3.0kN (300kg). The instability threshold is thought to be above 4.0kN (400kg) – that is, a capsizing event becomes increasingly probable as loads exceed 400kg. It is critically important to pay close attention to dressing and cinching of the knot before attempting to abseil. That is, climbers must exercise due diligence when tying this knot – by pulling firmly on each of the four rope segments – which is necessary to achieve a properly compacted and cinched dressing state.

Despite questions about this knot's security, it does present some advantages for use in rappels. Because the knot is offset from the axis of tension, it can translate more easily over uneven surfaces and 90 degree edges than other knots; and it is quickly tied and readily untied. Since a stuck rope on a multi-pitch descent can be catastrophic for climbers, these advantages, along with ease of tying, have led to its popularity. As with all knots used in life critical applications, the tails must be of sufficient minimum length (never less than 200mm in offset knots), and be diligently dressed and fully tightened by pulling individually on all four rope segments.

mid rotation state of No. 1410 offset overhand bend

An interesting yet overlooked fact is that #1410 (offset overhand bend), can be rotated to induce a choking effect to trap and crush the tails. Virtually all testers appear to only examine this knot in its mid-rotation state. It is theorized that this mid-rotation state is in fact the orientation where the structure is most vulnerable to capsizing. In addition, when tying the offset overhand bend using different rope diameters, the thinner diameter rope must be positioned underneath the larger diameter rope. This tactic further inhibits any likelihood of capsizing.

The offset figure-eight bend, a similar knot using the figure-eight knot, has been used in the belief that its greater size and complexity brings more security. But testing and more than one fatal failure indicate the figure-eight variant to be less secure, more prone to capsize at lower loads, and in capsizing uses more of the ends than does a capsizing overhand bend. Moreover, while there is one proper dressing of the overhand bend, there are a couple of dressings for the offset figure eight bend.

== See also ==
- List of bend knots
- List of knots
