= Sling (climbing) =

Item of climbing equipment

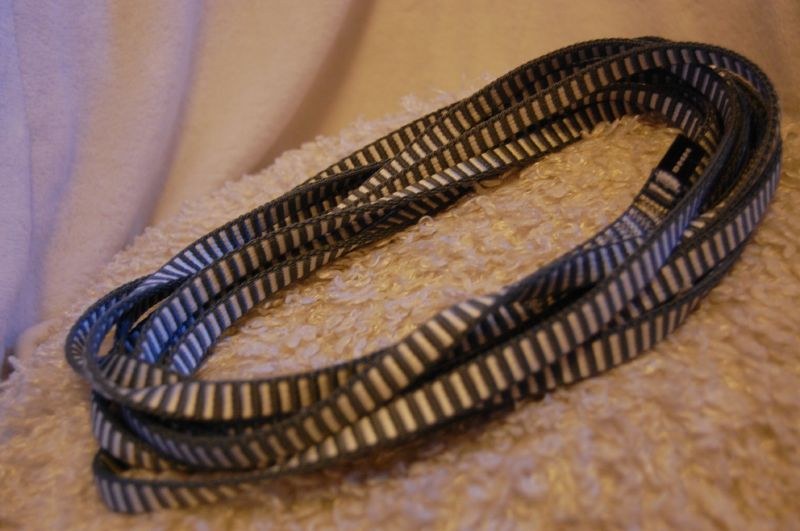
A 240 centimetres (94 in) Sling

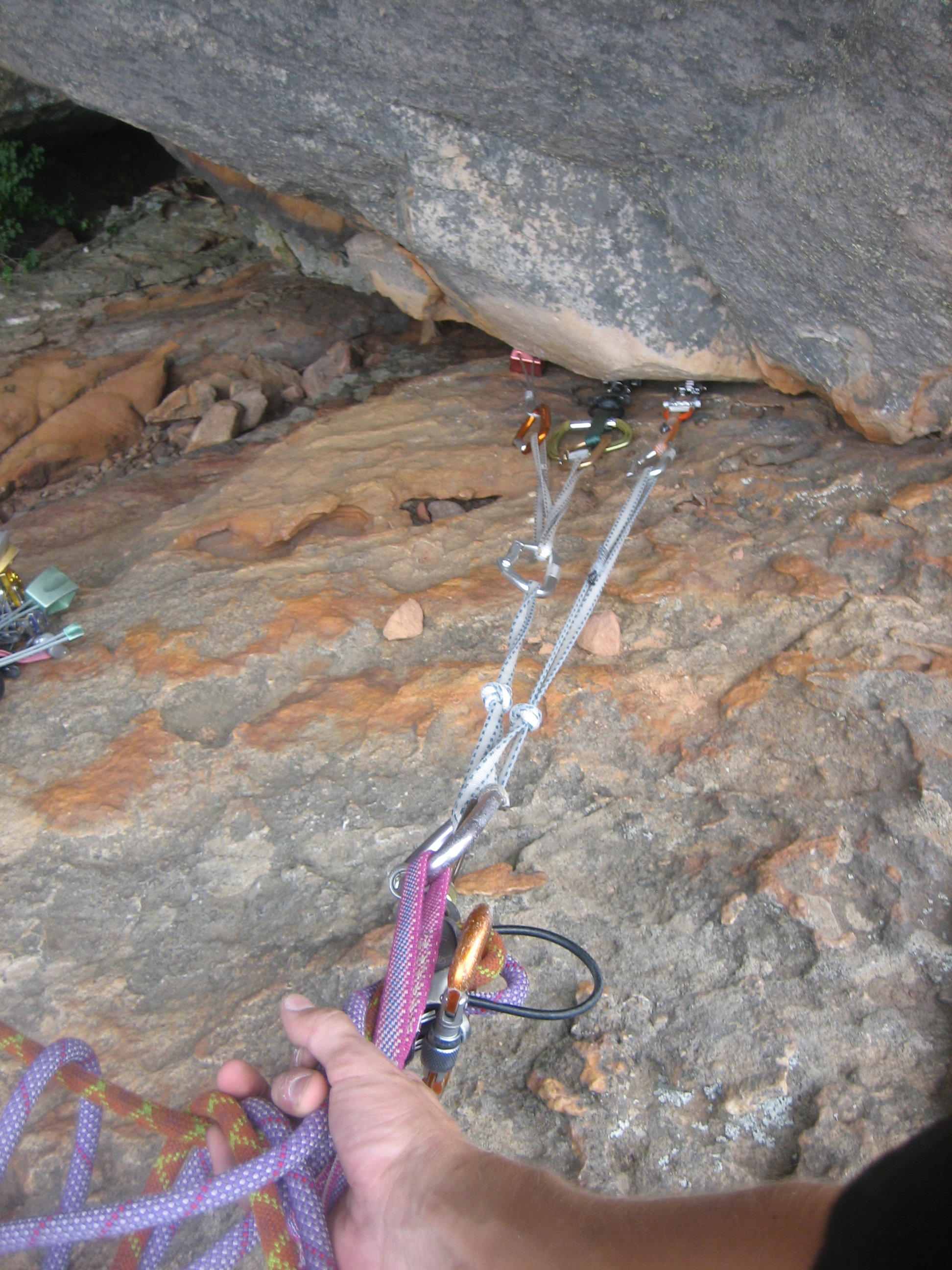
A climbing anchor equalized using Dyneema slings.

1957 article on use of slings by Jan and Herb Conn.

A sling is an item of climbing equipment consisting of a tied or sewn loop of webbing. These can be wrapped around sections of rock, hitched to other pieces of equipment, or tied directly to a tensioned line using a Prusik style knot. They may be used as anchors, to extend an anchor to reduce rope drag, in anchor equalization, or to climb a rope.

== Uses ==
In 1957 Jan and Herb Conn wrote an article titled "the versatile runner" with a long list of uses, which is still quite accurate:

1. Slings and now more often 3-foot alpine draws or shorter quickdraws are used in-between pieces of protection and the rope to minimize rope drag
2. Hitch around a chock stone or a tree to use as passive protection
3. Clove hitch around chicken heads or sling around horns
4. Longer slings or cordelettes can be used for equalized belay stations
5. Slings can be used as improvised "personal anchor system" attaching climber directly to anchors
6. Slings can be used as improvised retreat anchor used in mountaineering or alpine environment, to prevent leaving behind more expensive equipment

Other possible uses include:

- as improvised gear sling
- as improvised etrier or aider
- they are also very useful in clean rope management

== Types ==
Slings come both sewn to length and assembled from loose webbing knotted as desired. Common sewn lengths include 10 centimetres (3.9 in), 30 centimetres (12 in), 60 centimetres (24 in), 120 centimetres (47 in) and 240 centimetres (94 in). They are available in widths of 6–20 millimetres (0.24–0.79 in). Webbing for slings, also known as tape, is sold off the reel, cut to length with a hot knife to prevent fraying, and tied. The most common knots used for nylon slings are water knots and double fisherman's knots. Dyneema/Spectra slings are usually sewn not tied due to very high lubricity which leads to poor knot-holding ability and has led to the recommendation to use the triple fisherman's knot rather than the traditional double fisherman

Sewn slings have a rated breaking strength of at least 22 kilonewtons (4,900 lb_{f}). Short sewn slings are a component of quickdraws, sometimes known as dogbones. Traditionally, slings have been made of nylon. Increasingly, ultra high molecular weight polyethylene sold under the brand names Dyneema, Dynex and Spectra is used. These have much lower melting points than nylon, making them a potentially poor choice where high rope friction may occur. However this specialty polyethylene is lighter, smaller, and absorbs less water than nylon, and therefore has become popular.

== Gear sling ==
A gear sling is a loop of webbing used to organize or carry equipment. These can be custom items meant only to carry light gear, fully load-bearing manufactured gear racks capable of doubling for a sling, or simply a regular sling used to rack gear.

== See also ==
- Daisy Chain
- Climbing harness
