= Caving =

Recreational pastime of exploring cave systems

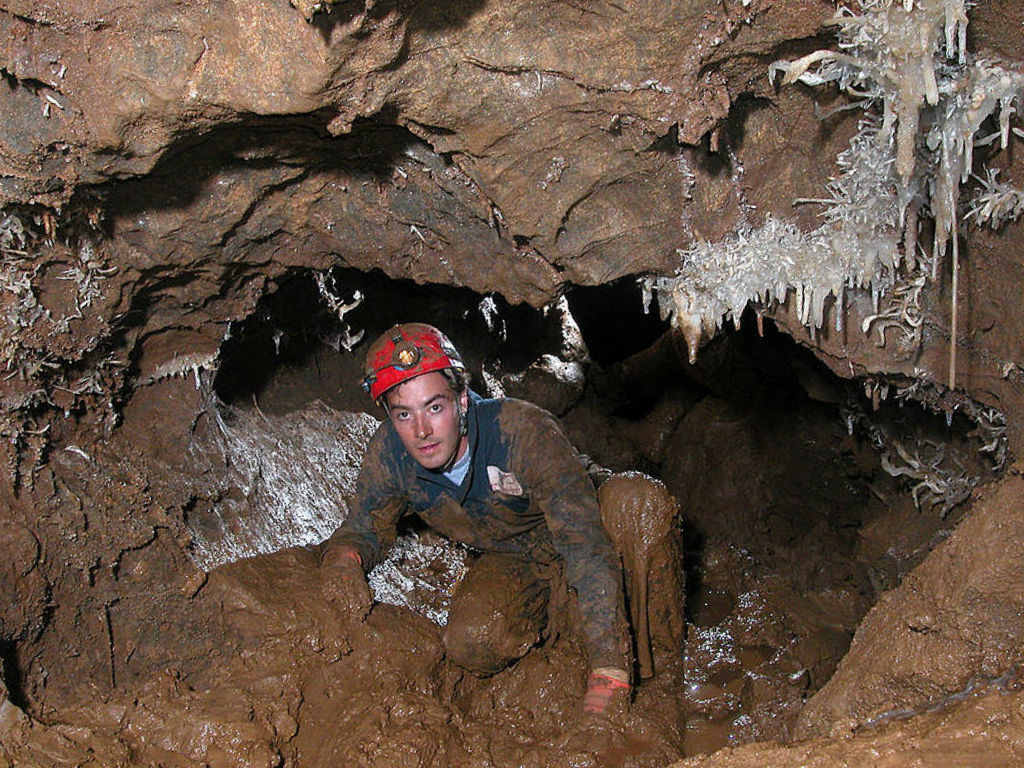
Caving in a muddy section of Black Chasm Cave in California

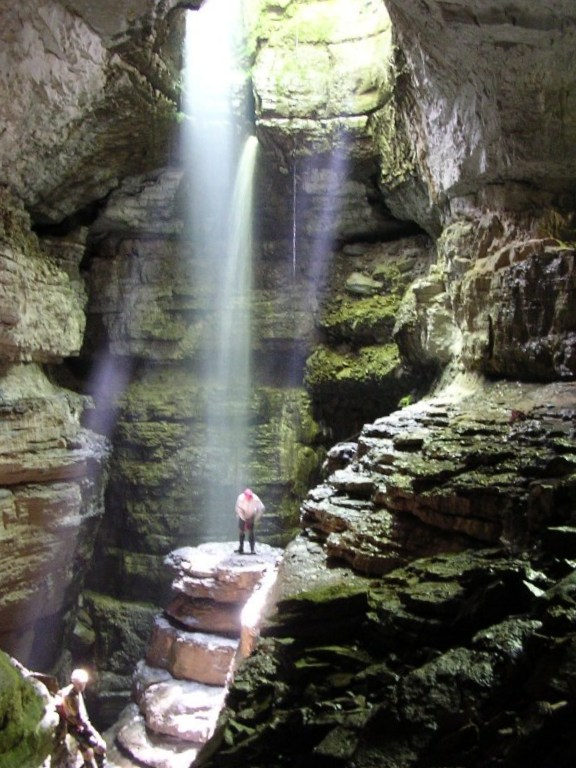
Stephens Gap, a vertical cave in Alabama

Caving, also known as spelunking (United States and Canada) and potholing (United Kingdom and Ireland), is the recreational pastime of exploring wild cave systems (as distinguished from show caves). In contrast, speleology is the scientific study of caves and the cave environment.

The challenges involved in caving vary according to the cave being visited; in addition to the total absence of light beyond the entrance, negotiating pitches, squeezes, and water hazards can be difficult. Cave diving is a distinct, and more hazardous, sub-speciality undertaken by a small minority of technically proficient cavers. In an area of overlap between recreational pursuit and scientific study, the most devoted and serious-minded cavers become accomplished at the surveying and mapping of caves and the formal publication of their efforts. These are usually published freely and publicly, especially in the UK and other European countries, although in the US they are generally more private.

Although caving is sometimes categorized as an "extreme sport," cavers do not commonly use this terminology and typically dislike the term being used in reference to caving, as it implies a disregard for safety. Though caving is a fairly safe sport compared to other activities that are sometimes classified as "extreme sports", incidents do occur. These tend to be related to flooding, hypothermia, rock falls, caver falls, SRT accidents, or some combination of these.

Many caving skills overlap with those involved in canyoning and mine and urban exploration.

== Motivation ==
Caving is often undertaken for the enjoyment of the outdoor activity or for physical exercise, as well as original exploration, similar to mountaineering or diving. Physical or biological science is also an important goal for some cavers, while others are engaged in cave photography. Virgin cave systems comprise some of the last unexplored regions on Earth and much effort is put into trying to locate, enter and survey them. In well-explored regions (such as most developed nations), the most accessible caves have already been explored, and gaining access to new caves often requires cave digging or cave diving.

Caving, in certain areas, has also been utilized as a form of eco and adventure tourism, for example in New Zealand. Tour companies have established an industry leading and guiding tours into and through caves. Depending on the type of cave and the type of tour, the experience could be adventure-based or ecological-based. There are tours led through lava tubes by a guiding service (e.g. Lava River Cave, the oceanic islands of Tenerife, Iceland and Hawaii).

Caving has also been described as an "individualist's team sport" by some, as cavers can often make a trip without direct physical assistance from others but will generally go in a group for companionship or to provide emergency help if needed. Some however consider the assistance cavers give each other as a typical team sport activity.

== Etymology ==
The term potholing refers to the act of exploring potholes, a word originating in the north of England for predominantly vertical caves.

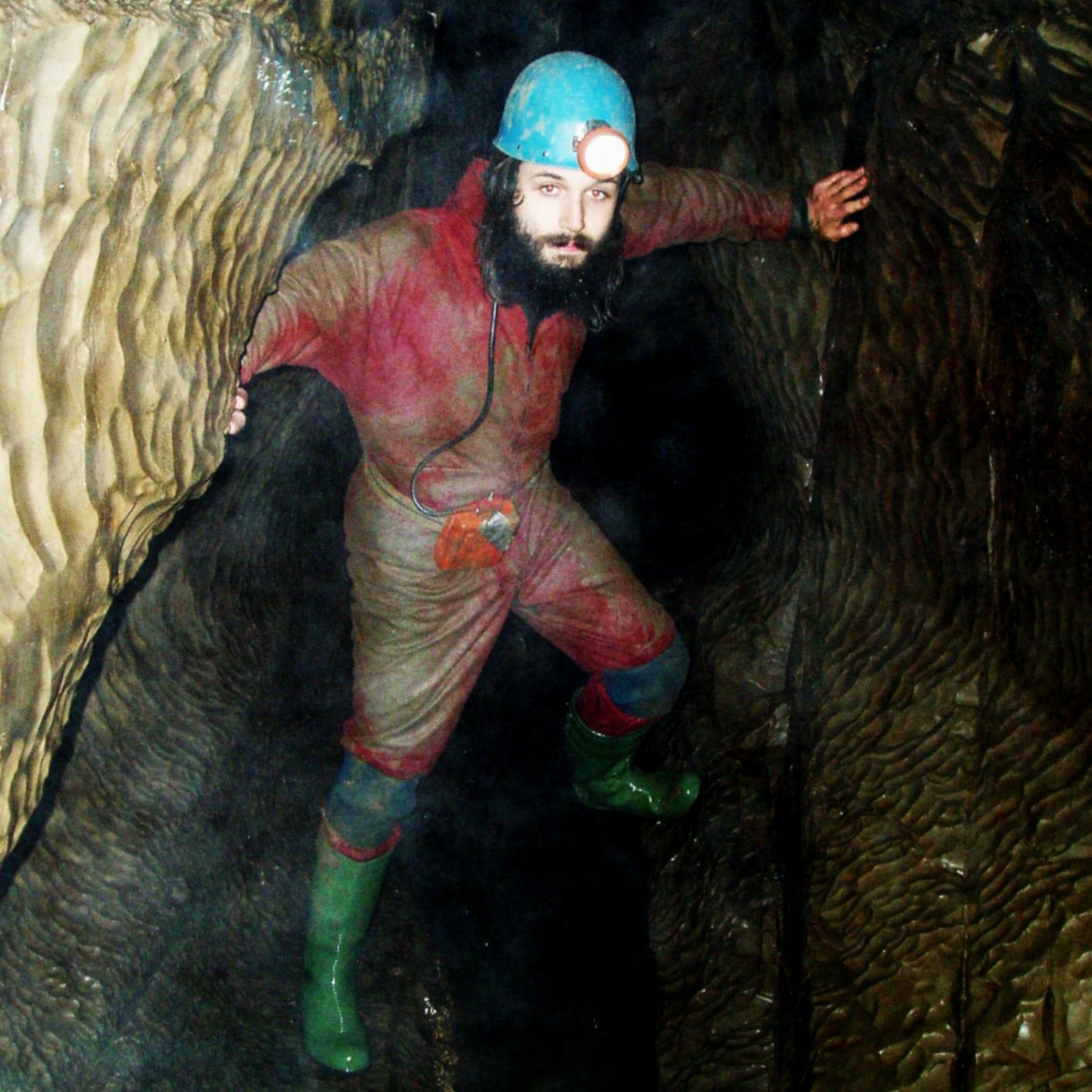
Caving in the north of England

Clay Perry, an American caver of the 1940s, wrote about a group of men and boys who explored and studied caves throughout New England. This group referred to themselves as spelunkers, a term derived from the Latin spēlunca ("cave, cavern, den"). This is regarded as the first use of the word in the Americas. Throughout the 1950s, spelunking was the general term used for exploring caves in US English. It was used freely, without any positive or negative connotations, although only rarely outside the US.

In the 1960s, the terms spelunking and spelunker began to be considered déclassé among experienced enthusiasts. In 1985, Steve Knutson – editor of the National Speleological Society (NSS) publication American Caving Accidents – made the following distinction:

…Note that (in this case) the term 'spelunker' denotes someone untrained and unknowledgeable in current exploration techniques, and 'caver' is for those who are.

This sentiment is exemplified by bumper stickers and T-shirts displayed by some cavers: "Cavers rescue spelunkers". Nevertheless, outside the caving community, "spelunking" and "spelunkers" predominately remain neutral terms referring to the practice and practitioners, without any respect to skill level.

== History ==
In the mid-19th century, John Birkbeck explored potholes in England, notably Gaping Gill in 1842 and Alum Pot in 1847–8, returning there in the 1870s. In the mid-1880s, Herbert E. Balch began exploring Wookey Hole Caves and in the 1890s, Balch was introduced to the caves of the Mendip Hills. One of the oldest established caving clubs, Yorkshire Ramblers' Club, was founded in 1892.

Caving as a specialized pursuit was pioneered by Édouard-Alfred Martel (1859–1938), who first achieved the descent and exploration of the Gouffre de Padirac, in France, as early as 1889 and the first complete descent of a 110-metre (360 ft) wet vertical shaft at Gaping Gill in 1895. He developed his own techniques based on ropes and metallic ladders. Martel visited Kentucky and notably Mammoth Cave National Park in October 1912. In the 1920s famous US caver Floyd Collins made important explorations in the area and in the 1930s, as caving became increasingly popular, small exploration teams both in the Alps and in the karstic high plateaus of southwest France (Causses and Pyrenees) transformed cave exploration into both a scientific and recreational activity. Robert de Joly, Guy de Lavaur and Norbert Casteret were prominent figures of that time, surveying mostly caves in Southwest France.

During World War II, an alpine team composed of Pierre Chevalier, Fernand Petzl, Charles Petit-Didier and others explored the Dent de Crolles cave system near Grenoble, France which became the deepest explored system in the world at that time at a depth of 658 metres (2,159 ft). The lack of available equipment during the war forced Pierre Chevalier and the rest of the team to develop their own equipment, leading to technical innovation. The scaling-pole (1940), nylon ropes (1942), use of explosives in caves (1947) and mechanical rope-ascenders (Henri Brenot's "monkeys", first used by Chevalier and Brenot in a cave in 1934) can be directly associated to the exploration of the Dent de Crolles cave system.

In 1941, American cavers organized themselves into the National Speleological Society (NSS) to advance the exploration, conservation, study and understanding of caves in the United States. American caver Bill Cuddington, known as "Vertical Bill", further developed the single-rope technique (SRT) in the late 1950s. In 1958, two Swiss alpinists, Juesi and Marti teamed together, creating the first rope ascender known as the Jumar. In 1968 Bruno Dressler asked Fernand Petzl, who worked as a metals machinist, to build a rope-ascending tool, today known as the Petzl Croll, that he had developed by adapting the Jumar to vertical caving. Pursuing these developments, Petzl started in the 1970s a caving equipment manufacturing company named Petzl. The development of the rappel rack and the evolution of mechanical ascension systems extended the practice and safety of vertical exploration to a wider range of cavers.

== Practice and equipment ==
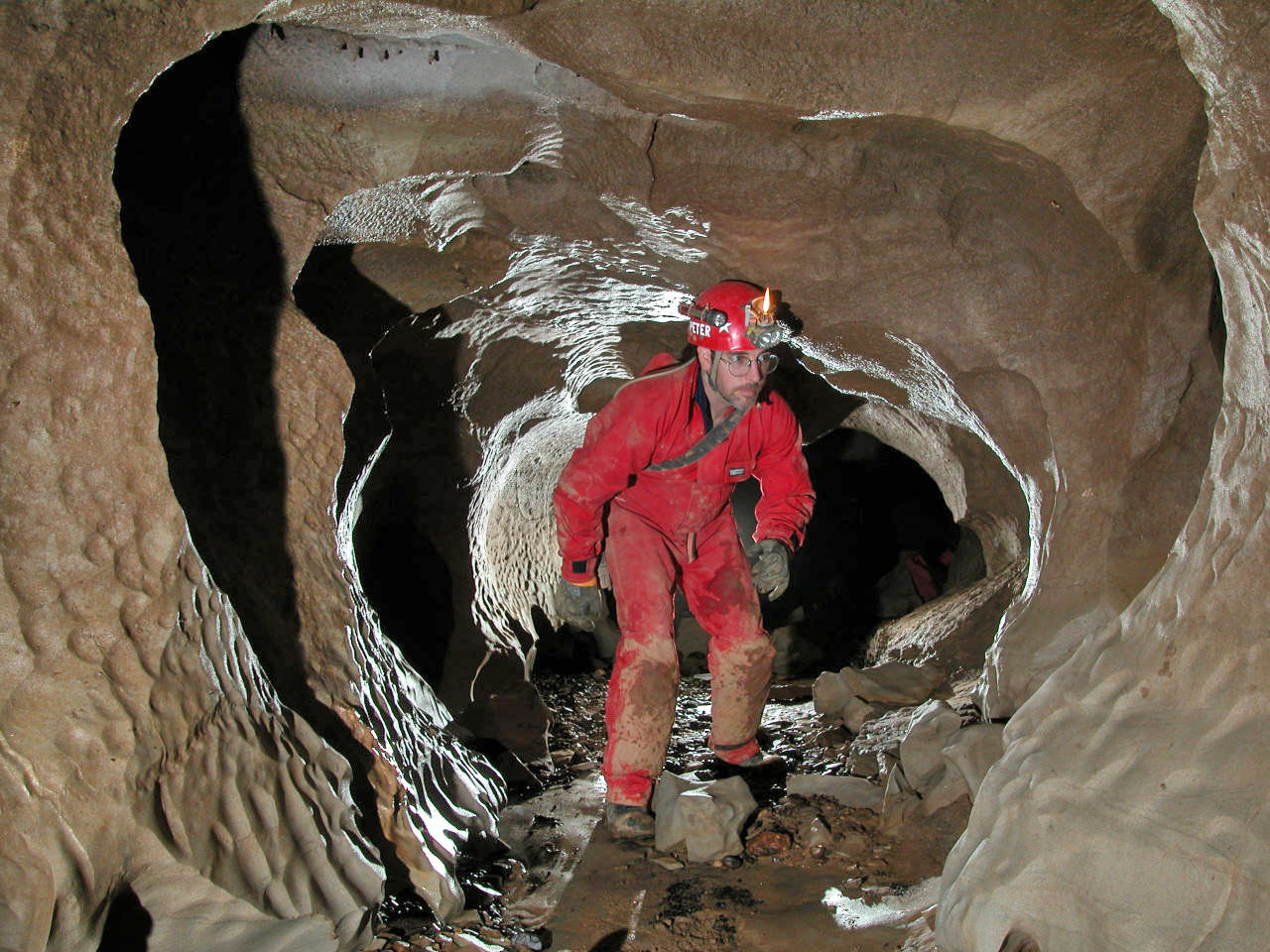
Caver in an Alabama cave showing common caving wear: coveralls, helmet-mounted lights, heavy boots and gloves.

Hard hats are worn to protect the head from bumps and falling rocks. The caver's primary light source is usually mounted on the helmet in order to keep the hands free. Electric LED lights are most common. Many cavers carry two or more sources of light – one as primary and the others as backup in case the first fails. More often than not, a second light will be mounted to the helmet for quick transition if the primary fails. Carbide lamp systems are an older form of illumination, inspired by miner's equipment, and are still used by some cavers, particularly on remote expeditions where electric charging facilities are not available.

The type of clothes worn underground varies according to the environment of the cave being explored, and the local culture. In cold caves, the caver may wear a warm base layer that retains its insulating properties when wet, such as a fleece ("furry") suit or polypropylene underwear, and an oversuit of hard-wearing (e.g., cordura) or waterproof (e.g., PVC) material. Lighter clothing may be worn in warm caves, particularly if the cave is dry, and in tropical caves thin polypropylene clothing is used, to provide some abrasion protection while remaining as cool as possible. Wetsuits may be worn if the cave is particularly wet or involves stream passages. On the feet boots are worn – hiking-style boots in drier caves, or rubber boots (such as wellies) often with neoprene socks ("wetsocks") in wetter caves. Knee-pads (and sometimes elbow-pads) are popular for protecting joints during crawls. Depending on the nature of the cave, gloves are sometimes worn to protect the hands against abrasion or cold. In pristine areas and for restoration, clean oversuits and powder-free, non-latex surgical gloves are used to protect the cave itself from contaminants. Ropes are used for descending or ascending pitches (single rope technique or SRT) or for protection. Knots commonly used in caving are the figure-of-eight- (or figure-of-nine-) loop, bowline, alpine butterfly, and Italian hitch. Ropes are usually rigged using bolts, slings, and carabiners. In some cases cavers may choose to bring and use a flexible metal ladder.

In addition to the equipment already described, cavers frequently carry packs containing first-aid kits, emergency equipment, and food. Containers for securely transporting urine are also commonly carried. On longer trips, containers for securely transporting feces out of the cave are carried.

During very long trips, it may be necessary to camp in the cave – some cavers have stayed underground for many days, or in particularly extreme cases, for weeks at a time. This is particularly the case when exploring or mapping extensive cave systems, where it would be impractical to retrace the route back to the surface regularly. Such long trips necessitate the cavers carrying provisions, sleeping, and cooking equipment.

== Safety ==
A caver begins rope descent of a vertical shaft using an abseil rack.

Caves can be dangerous places; hypothermia, falling, flooding, falling rocks and physical exhaustion are the main risks. Rescuing people from underground is difficult and time-consuming, and requires special skills, training, and equipment. Full-scale cave rescues often involve the efforts of dozens of rescue workers (often other long-time cavers who have participated in specialized courses, as normal rescue staff are not sufficiently experienced in cave environments), who may themselves be put in jeopardy in effecting the rescue.

Caving in warmer climates carries the risk of contracting histoplasmosis, a fungal infection that is contracted from bird or bat droppings. It can cause pneumonia and can disseminate in the body to cause continued infections.

In many parts of the world, leptospirosis, a type of bacterial infection spread by animals including rats, is a distinct threat. The presence of rat urine in rainwater or precipitation that enters the cave's water system is the primary vector of infection. Complications are uncommon, but can be serious. These safety risks while caving can be minimized by using a number of techniques:

- Checking that there is no danger of flooding during the expedition. Rainwater funneled underground can flood a cave very quickly, trapping people in cut-off passages and drowning them. In the UK, drowning accounts for almost half of all caving fatalities (see List of UK caving fatalities).
- Using teams of several cavers, preferably at least four. If an injury occurs, one caver stays with the injured person while the other two go out for help, providing assistance to each other on their way out.
- Notifying people outside the cave as to the intended return time. After an appropriate delay without a return, these will then organize a search party (usually made up by other cavers trained in cave rescues, as even professional emergency personnel are unlikely to have the skills to effect a rescue in difficult conditions).
- Use of helmet-mounted lights (hands-free) with extra batteries. American cavers recommend a minimum of three independent sources of light per person, but two lights is common practice among European cavers.
- Sturdy clothing and footwear, as well as a helmet, are necessary to reduce the impact of abrasions, falls, and falling objects. Synthetic fibers and woolens, which dry quickly, shed water, and are warm when wet, are vastly preferred to cotton materials, which retain water and increase the risk of hypothermia. It is also helpful to have several layers of clothing, which can be shed (and stored in the pack) or added as needed. In watery cave passages, polypropylene thermal underwear or wetsuits may be required to avoid hypothermia.
- Cave passages look different from different directions. In long or complex caves, even experienced cavers can become lost. To reduce the risk of becoming lost, it is necessary to memorize the appearance of key navigational points in the cave as they are passed by the exploring party. Each member of a cave party shares responsibility for being able to remember the route out of the cave. In some caves it may be acceptable to mark a small number of key junctions with small stacks or "cairns" of rocks, or to leave a non-permanent mark such as high-visibility flagging tape tied to a projection.
- Vertical caving uses ladders or single rope technique (SRT) to avoid the need for climbing passages that are too difficult. SRT is a complex skill and requires proper training and well-maintained equipment. Some drops that are abseiled down may be as deep as several hundred meters (for example Harwoods Hole).

== Cave conservation ==
Many cave environments are very fragile. Many speleothems can be damaged by even the slightest touch and some by impacts as slight as a breath. Research suggests that increased carbon dioxide levels can lead to "a higher equilibrium concentration of calcium within the drip waters feeding the speleothems, and hence causes dissolution of existing features." In 2008, researchers found evidence that respiration from cave visitors may generate elevated carbon dioxide concentrations in caves, leading to increased temperatures of up to 3 °C and a dissolution of existing features.

Pollution is also of concern. Since water that flows through a cave eventually comes out in streams and rivers, any pollution may ultimately end up in someone's drinking water, and can even seriously affect the surface environment, as well. Even minor pollution such as dropping organic material can have a dramatic effect on the cave biota.

Cave-dwelling species are also very fragile. Often, a particular species found in a cave may live within that cave alone, and be found nowhere else in the world; an example is the Alabama cave shrimp. Cave-dwelling species are accustomed to a near-constant climate of temperature and humidity, and any disturbance can be disruptive to the species' life cycles. Though cave wildlife may not always be immediately visible, it is typically nonetheless present in most caves.

Bats are one such fragile species of cave-dwelling animal. Bats which hibernate are most vulnerable during the winter season, when no food supply exists on the surface to replenish the bat's store of energy should it be awakened from hibernation. Bats which migrate are most sensitive during the summer months when they are raising their young. For these reasons, visiting caves inhabited by hibernating bats is discouraged during cold months; and visiting caves inhabited by migratory bats is discouraged during the warmer months when they are most sensitive and vulnerable. Due to an affliction affecting bats in the northeastern US known as white nose syndrome (WNS), the US Fish & Wildlife Service has called for a moratorium effective March 26, 2009, on caving activity in states known to have hibernacula (MD, NY, VT, NH, MA, CT, NJ, PA, VA, and WV) affected by WNS, as well as adjoining states.

Some cave passages may be marked with flagging tape or other indicators to show biologically, aesthetically, or archaeologically sensitive areas. Marked paths may show ways around notably fragile areas such as a pristine floor of sand or silt which may be thousands of years old, dating from the last time water flowed through the cave. Such deposits may easily be spoiled forever by a single misplaced step. Active formations such as flowstone can be similarly marred with a muddy footprint or handprint, and ancient human artifacts, such as fiber products, may even crumble to dust under all but the most gentle touch.

In 1988, concerned that cave resources were becoming increasingly damaged through unregulated use, Congress enacted the Federal Cave Resources Protection Act, giving land management agencies in the United States expanded authority to manage cave conservation on public land.

== Caving organizations ==
Cavers in many countries have created organizations for the administration and oversight of caving activities within their nations. The oldest of these is the French Federation of Speleology (originally Société de spéléologie) founded by Édouard-Alfred Martel in 1895, which produced the first periodical journal in speleology, Spelunca. The first University-based speleological institute, was founded in 1919 in Bristol, England as the University of Bristol Spleleological Society.

The British Speleological Association was established in 1935. In the United States, the National Speleological Society in the US was founded in 1941; however, it was originally formed as the Speleological Society of the District of Columbia on May 6, 1939.

An international speleological congress was proposed at a meeting in Valence-sur-Rhone, France in 1949 and first held in 1953 in Paris. The International Union of Speleology (UIS) was founded in 1965.

== See also ==
- List of caves
- List of longest caves
- List of deepest caves
- Speleology – Science of cave and karst systems
