= Petzl Croll =

Ascender used in climbing and caving

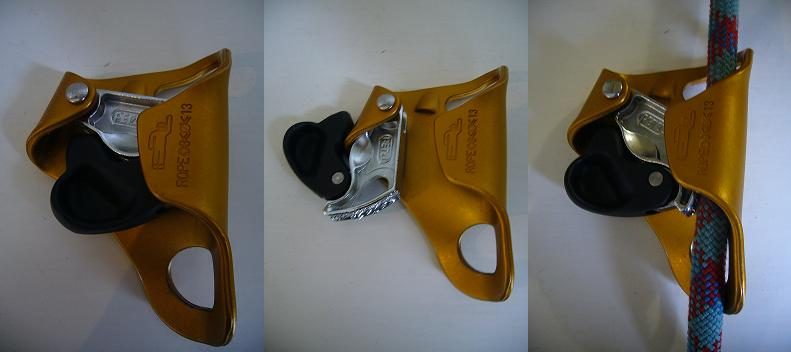
A Petzl Croll with the gate closed, open and with a rope locked in place.

A Petzl Croll is an ascending device used in caving and industrial rope access made by the French company Petzl. Its name comes from the town Crolles where Petzl's company headquarters are located but might also be a reference to the nearby cave system of the Dent de Crolles, the exploration of which triggered a lot of technical effort leading to innovations in caving equipment.

== Usage ==
The Croll is normally used in the chest position and in conjunction with an upper ascender or Jumar. This configuration allows a climber, caver or rope access worker to rapidly ascend a rope.

== History ==
In 1968 Bruno Dressler asked Fernand Petzl, who worked as a metals machinist, to build a rope-ascending tool, today known as the Petzl Croll, that he had developed by adapting the Jumar to the specificity of pit caving. Following these developments, Fernand Petzl started in the 1970s a small caving equipment manufacturing company Petzl.

== Standards ==
- EN 567 This standard allows the Croll to be used by IRATA qualified technicians.
- EN 12841
- CE 0197
