= Petzl =

French consumer goods company

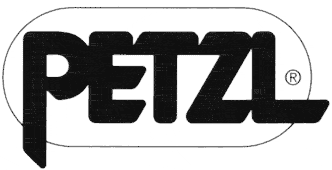
- Current Petzl logo
- Industry: Sport & Recreation; Industrial Work-at-Height; Technical Rescue
- Founded: 1970; 56 years ago
- Founder: Fernand Petzl
- Headquarters: Crolles, France
- Key people: Paul Petzl (President)
- Number of employees: 1200 (2025)
- Website: www.petzl.com

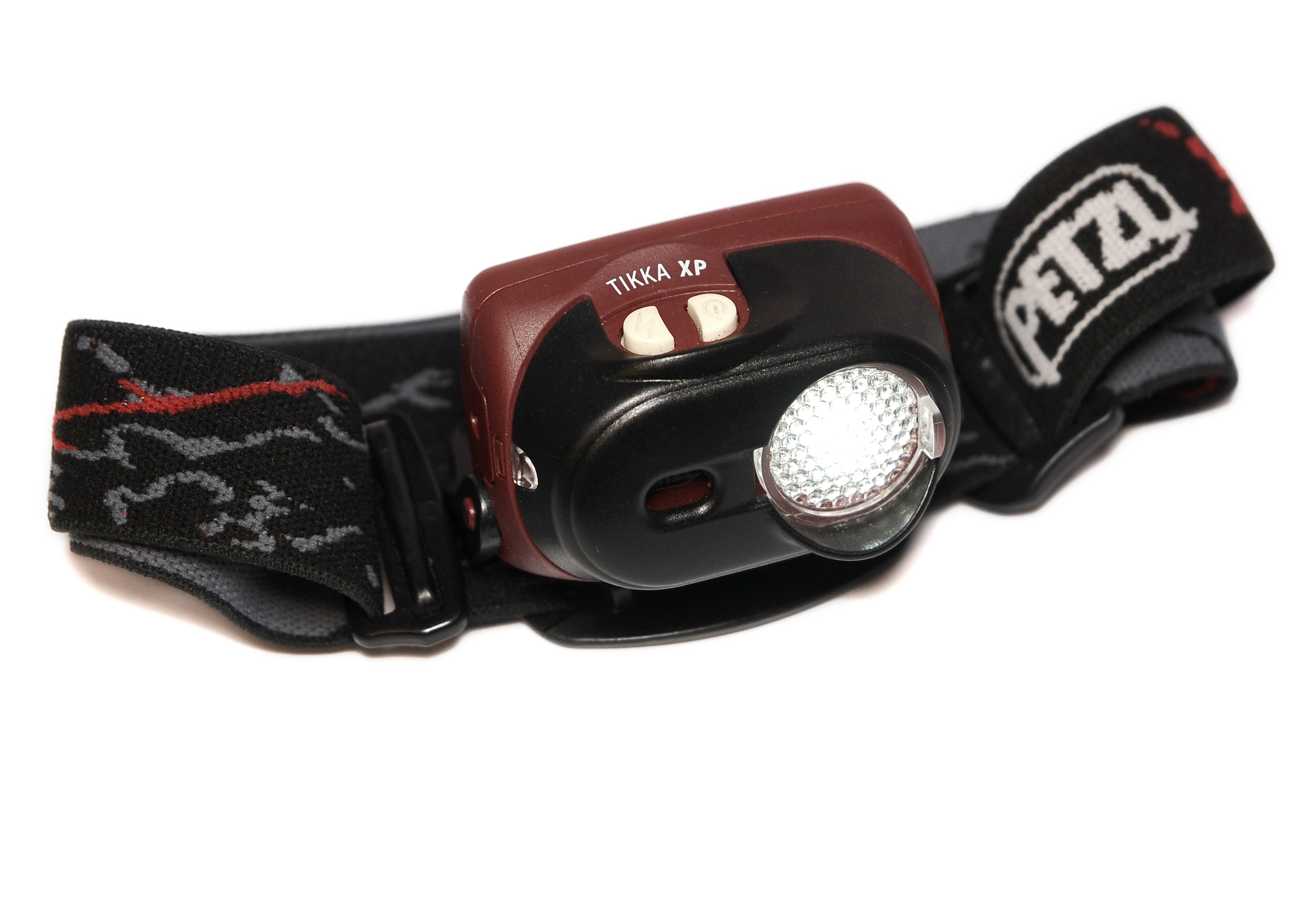
Headlamp Tikka XP made by Petzl

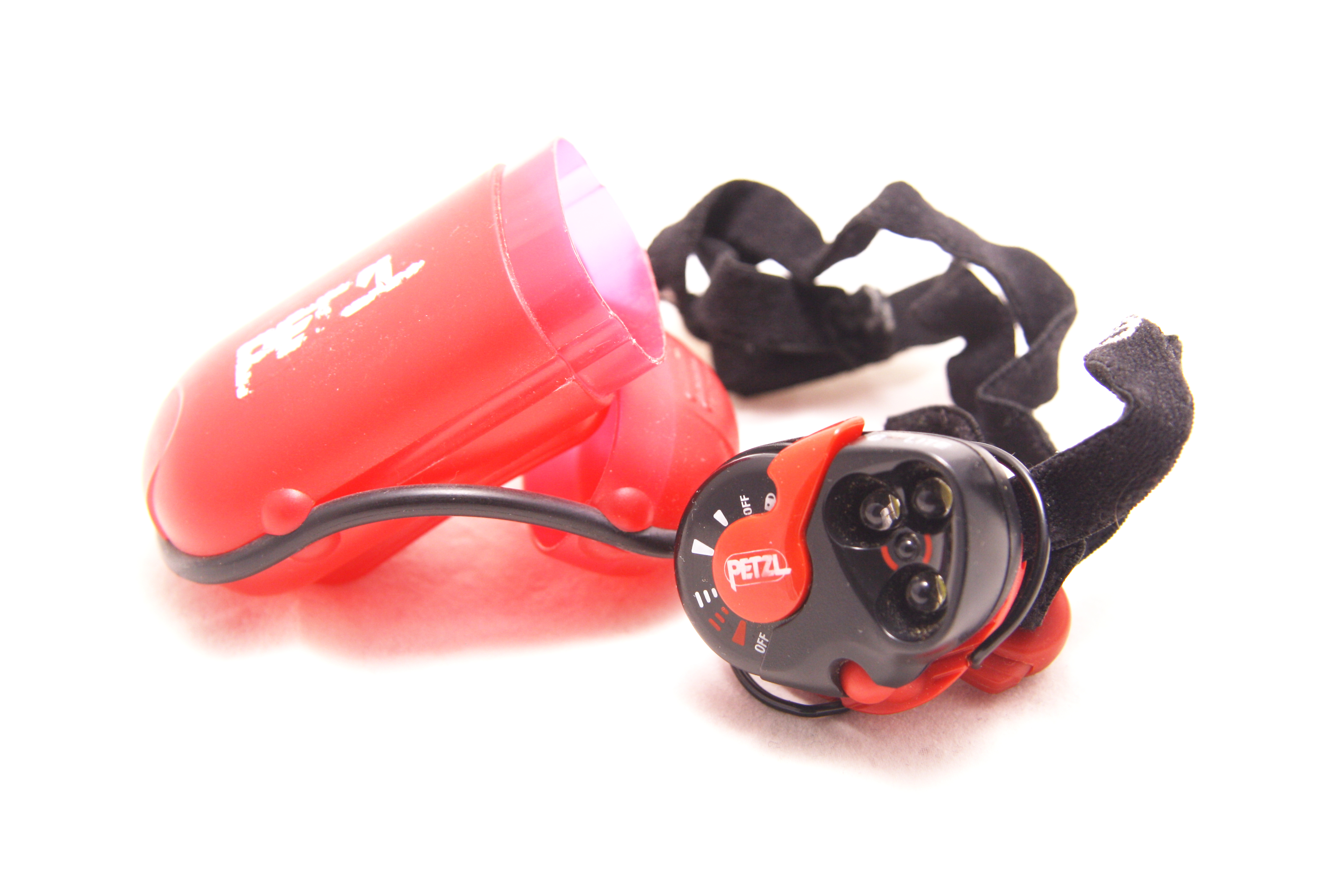
Headlamp Petzl e+Lite

Petzl is a French manufacturer of climbing gear, caving gear, work-at-height equipment, and headlamps based in Crolles (near Grenoble), France. The company was created by the cave explorer Fernand Petzl in the mid-1970s. Their three specialties are:

- Vertical sports: equipment for mountaineering, climbing, caving, etc.
- Work at height and rescue: solutions for progression and safety in difficult-access worksites and in technical rescue.
- Headlamps (head torches) that provide hands-free lighting.

== History ==
Fernand Petzl, born in 1912, began his caving career in the late 1920s and early 1930s. In 1936, Petzl was introduced to, then small-time caver, Pierre Chevalier. The two began work on improving the technology behind their sport.

In 1943, Chevalier designed and tested the first nylon rope to replace caving ladders. This technology provided the foundation for nearly all vertical safety methods to come. Chevalier's innovation led to the first 1,000 meter cave descent when Petzl explored the Gouffre Berger in France in 1950.

In the late 1960s and early 1970s, Petzl began experimenting further with vertical safety technology, and in 1968 he produced his first rope ascenders, then marketed as “Produits Fernand Petzl (Fernand Petzl Products)”. Five years later, in 1973, Petzl developed his first mountaineering headlamp.

In 1975, the Petzl corporation was born as Fernand Petzl established the first company headquarters in Crolles, France. “This was the beginning of Petzl manufacturing.”. The initial workshop was approximately 7,200 square feet (670 m^{2}), and located at the base of Dent de Crolles “Tooth of Crolles” close to Grenoble.

Two years after establishing a base, Petzl produced its first vertical safety harness in 1977. In the early 1980s the company began expanding its products from caving to vertical sports such as rock climbing and mountaineering, as well as to rescue. The company's first brand name head lamp, the ZOOM, was produced in 1981. Later, in 1986, Petzl developed its first R&D department and testing tower.

In 1990, Petzl's first products for work at height were produced, and the Petzl Securité department was developed. Petzl's first self braking device, the Grigri, was produced a year later in the United States. The Grigri is still produced and sold today. Also developed in the 1990s was a modification of Fernand Petzl's initial rope ascender design. The TIBLOC, which is still sold today, was developed in 1998. In 1998, Petzl moved its North American distribution center from La Fayette, Georgia, United States, to Clearfield, Utah, United States. The Clearfield center became the first corporate owned distribution center outside of its own country (France). At the time Petzl depended upon 28 private firms for distribution outside of North America. Pigeon Mountain Industries was the former distributor of Petzl products in North America before the development of the Clearfield location.

Petzl acquired the ice axe and crampon developer Charlet Moser in 2000, thereby expanding its production to include ice climbing technology. The first LED headlamps were produced in 2000 under the brand name TIKKA.

As of 2001, Petzl had approximately 600 products. Later in 2002, the QUARK ERGO was developed and designed to be the first leashless, angled ice axe. In 2004, Petzl's first fall arrest device for work at height was developed. In 2006, the Petzl corporation introduced new general director Pascal Bonino, and the Petzl Foundation was also developed.

The aim of the foundation is to promote low-impact outdoor activity as well as raise social and environmental awareness for outdoor sports such as mountaineering. This is accomplished through the Petzl Foundation's endorsement of ecological preservation projects, research in risk prevention, and general education in work at height and recreational activities at height.

In 2006, Petzl America commissioned the recall of approximately 8,000 carabiners due to the models’ susceptibility to failure. In January 2007, Petzl participated in safety and rescue demonstrations in Dubai at the world's largest security and safety fair

Fernand Petzl died in 2003. His son, Paul, is the president and founder of the Petzl corporation.

== The Petzl Team ==
The Petzl Team is a group of climbers and innovators who assist the company to develop and test its products. The team consists of the following:

- Josune Bereziartu
- Emily Harrington
- François Damilano
- Daniel Du Lac
- Dave Graham
- Lynn Hill
- Alexander Huber
- Robert Jasper
- Olivier Testa
- Chris Sharma

Several members of the team are professional climbers. Some such as Chris Sharma have climbed some of the world's hardest routes. Such routes by Sharma include Jumbo Love (5.15ab) in 2008, La Rambla, Es Pontàs and Realization (considered to be first 5.15 class route) in 2001.

Lynn Hill, another Petzl team member, was the first woman to set and ascend a route graded at 5.12+ or 5.13. In 1990, Hill was the winner of the IFSC Climbing World Cup. Hill also became the first person to free climb The Nose at Yosemite's El Capitan in under 24 hours.
