= Pierre Chevalier (caver) =

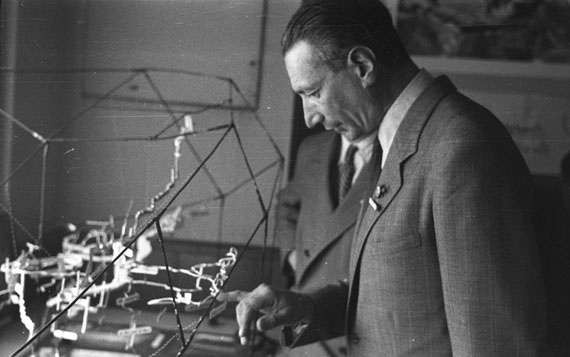
- Born: April 24 1905
- Died: December 4 2001

Pierre Chevalier (24 April 1905 – 4 December 2001) was a well-known caver and mountaineer from France, with many alpine ascents and cave explorations to his credit. Chevalier is principally known for the exploration of the Dent de Crolles cave system over a twelve-year period (1936 – 1947), which became the deepest cave in the world. Chevalier recorded this exploration in his book Escalades souterraines (Subterranean Climbers).

== Dent de Crolles Cave Network ==
Chevalier first visited the Trou du Glaz entrance in 1935, and was struck by the possibility of exploring beyond what was at the time considered technically possible. With Fernand Petzl, Charles Petit-Didier and others, Chevalier completed explorations that connected four entrances (Trou du Glaz, Guiers Mort, P40 and Grotte Annette) and established the Dent de Crolles as the deepest cave system in the world (-658m).

Much of this exploration was during the German occupation of France during the Second World War and at a time when both transportation and supplies were difficult to obtain. In addition, much of the exploration was undertaken from the bottom upwards. The exploration of Dent de Crolles demonstrated outstanding commitment and perseverance in the face of physical, technological and political adversity.

== Innovation in cave exploration ==
Cave exploration in France had taken the form of a single leader being supported by a team of subordinates. These teams often pushed a cave system until time or some other obstacle intervened, then retreated to tackle another prospect. Chevalier and his associates worked as a small team where each participant was capable of leadership. They also treated the cave system within the Dent de Crolles massif as a single project, and persisted in explorations until most of its vertical range was realized. Both the small-team egalitarianism and single-cave project work are models followed by cavers today.

Unwilling to stop explorations in the face of technical obstacles, Chevalier and his associates were responsible for the conception and construction of new tools and methods of exploration. The scaling-pole (1940), nylon ropes (1942), explosives (1947) and mechanical rope-ascenders (Henri Brenot's "monkeys", first used by Chevalier and Brenot in a cave in 1934) were innovations that were used successfully in the Dent de Crolles cave system.

== Subterranean Climbers ==
In 1948 Chevalier published Escalades souterraines, detailing twelve years of explorations within the Dent de Crolles cave system. The book has been reprinted twice in English as Subterranean Climbers. Because of its modest tone, detailed descriptions, and the sheer scale of the undertaking, it is generally considered to be one of the best caving books ever written.

== Memberships ==
- General Secretary of the Groupe de Haute Montagne, 1929-1930.
- Life-member of Club Alpin Français.
- Founding member of the Spéléo Club de Lyon, vice president 1937.
- President of Spéléo Club Alpin de Lyon, 1943.
- Founding member of the Spéléo Club de Paris.
- Life member of the Société Spéléologique de France, vice president 1938; president 1951, 1953.
- Vice-president of the Comité National de Spéléologie, 1949.
- Honorary member of the Fédération Française de Spéléologie, 1963.
