= Gouffre Berger =

Cave in the French alps

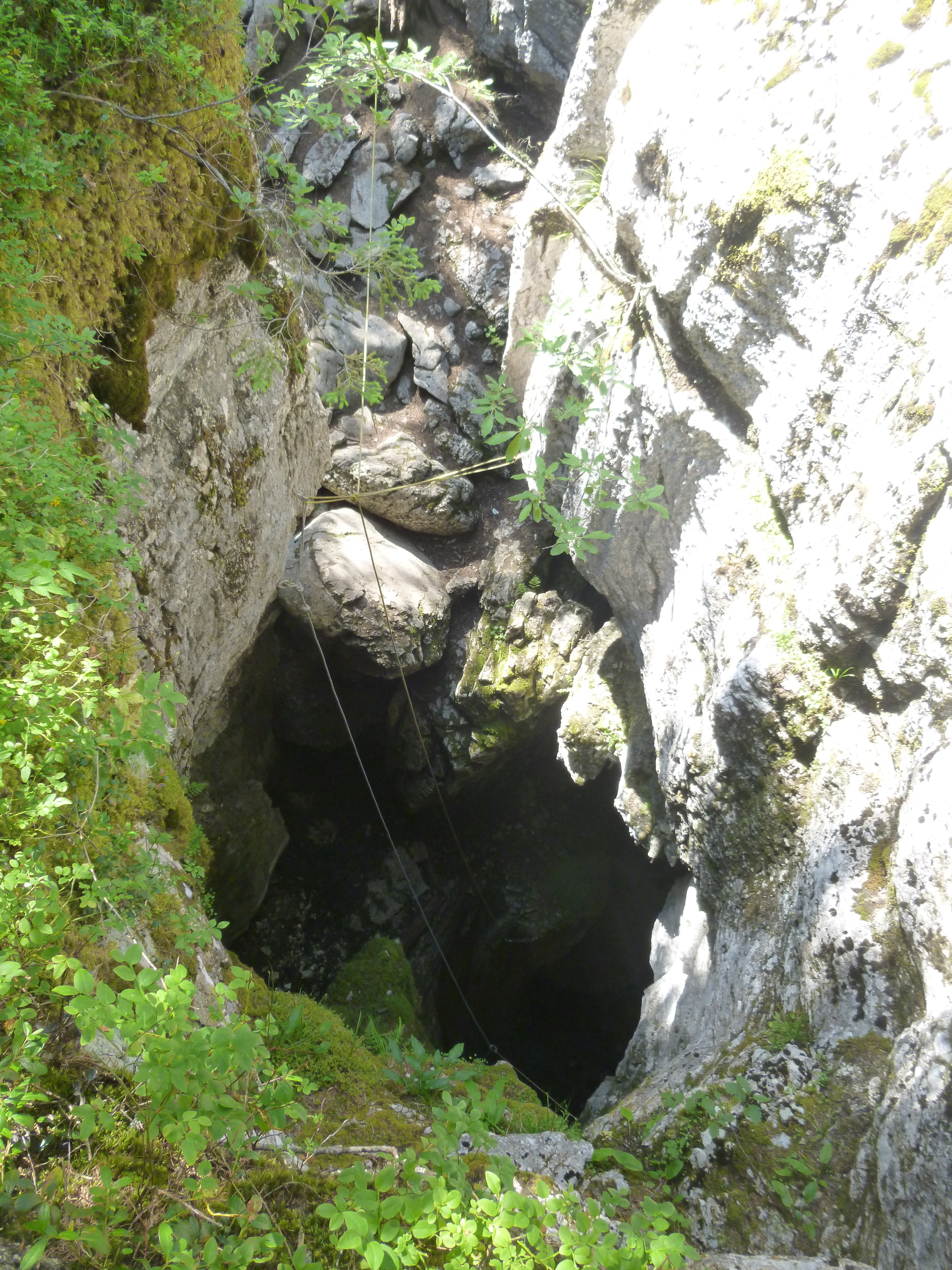
- Interactive map of Gouffre Berger
- Location: Engins
- Coordinates: 45°13′09″N 5°36′17.2″E
- Depth: 1,258 metres (4,127 ft) (Note: A calculation based on the altitude of the sump of the west gallery of the Cuves de Sassenage gives -1250 m in relation to the gouffre de la Fromagère.)
- Length: 45,000 metres (148,000 ft)
- Elevation: 1,456 m (4,777 ft)
- Discovery: 1953
- Geology: Limestone
- Entrances: 11

The Gouffre Berger is a cave in the French alps within the commune of Engins high on the Vercors Plateau. It was discovered on 24 May 1953 by Joseph Berger, Georges Bouvet, Ruiz de Arcaute and Marc Jouffrey. From 1953 to 1963, it was regarded as the deepest cave in the world at −1,122 metres (−3,681 ft), relinquishing this title to the previous contender, Pierre Saint Martin, in 1964, after further exploration. The Gouffre Berger, the first -1000, is now ranked 41th deepest cave in the world, and the 4th in France.

To return from the bottom of the cave back to the surface can take between 15 and 30 hours, without long breaks.

In 1967, Ken Pearce, a metallurgy lecturer from Britain, descended with the Pegasus Caving Club team from Nottingham UK, organised and led by Peter Watkinson, and along with a 40-metre (130 ft) dive, reached a depth of −1,133 metres (−3,717 ft). They emerged after 13 days underground, having set a new world record at the time. In 1968, B Leger and J Dubois reached a depth of −1,141 metres (−3,743 ft). This record was held until July 1982, when Patrick Penez attained −1,191 metres (−3,907 ft). In 1990, a breakthrough was made, connecting the cave to the nearby "Scialet de la Fromagère". This gives the current recorded depth as −1,271 metres (−4,170 ft) In June 2011 the terminal sumps were dived and in 2014 another attempt was made to pass the sumps.

In recent years there have been six fatalities in this cave, five due to water. During a storm or heavy rain, the Gouffre Berger can become a dangerous trap and the water levels rise very quickly. In 1996, Englishwoman Nicola Perrin (née Dollimore) and Hungarian Istvan Torda died due to violent flooding in the cave.

The water that flows through the cave has been traced to re-appear in the flooded sections of the Cuves de Sassenage. As of 2017 the system was estimated to contain approximately thirty-seven kilometres of passage with eleven entrances.

Since 2013, clean-up actions have been carried out by cavers. At the end of 2018 the Gouffre Berger has become clean again.

In 2014, attempts to join by siphons continued and an eleventh entrance, which communicates with the Fromagère, was created in September 2016; this is the "goufre Delta 35"

During the year 2022 a new network named "the Sardine Star", located at the level of the large waterfall of 27 metres, is being explored.

A link was finally made on December 28, 2024 between the Gouffre Berger and the gouffre de la Fromagère, avoiding the last sump.

== Location ==
The entrance is within the commune of Engins high on the Vercors Plateau. In June 2000, the commune lifted a two-year ban on exploration.

== Cross section survey ==
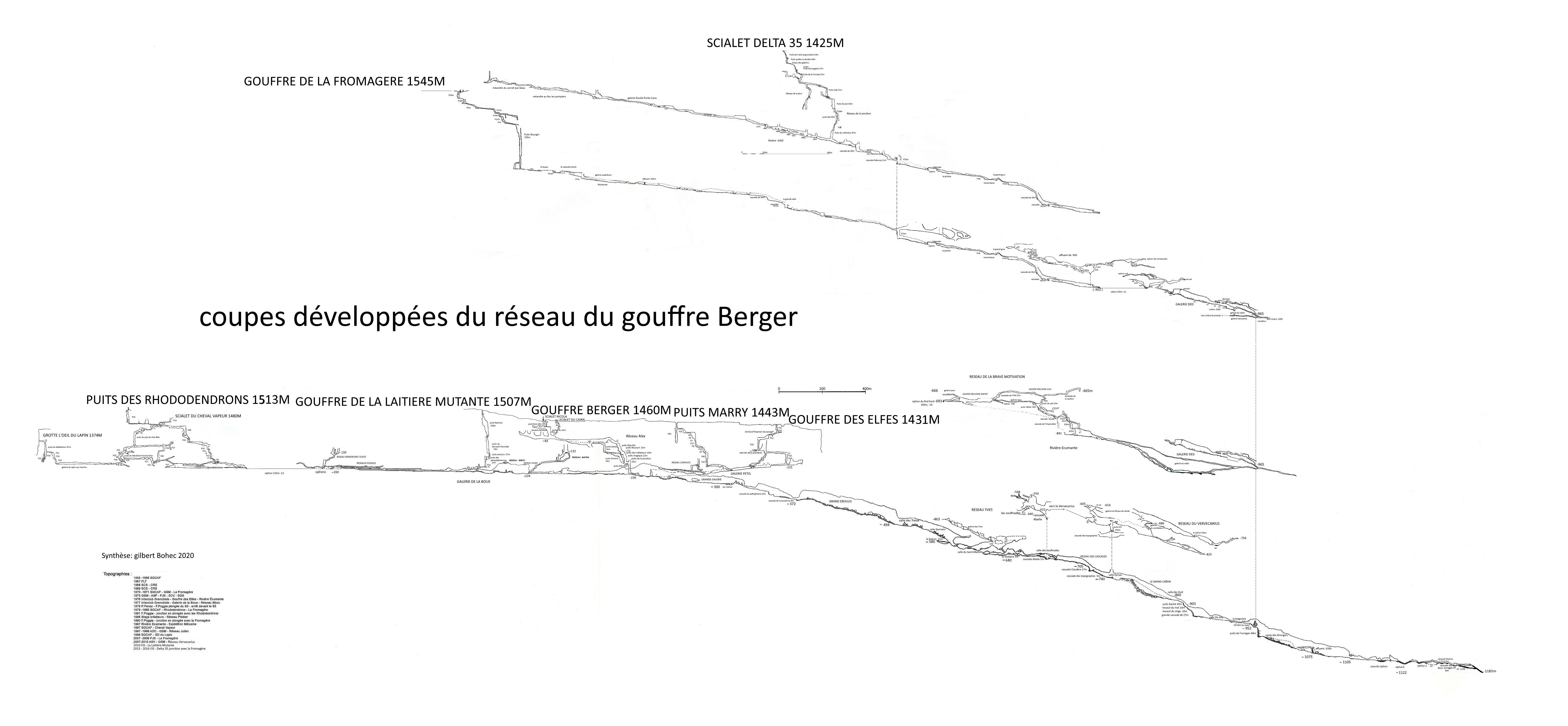
Side profile map of gouffre Berger in 2022.

== Image gallery ==
Aspects of the network

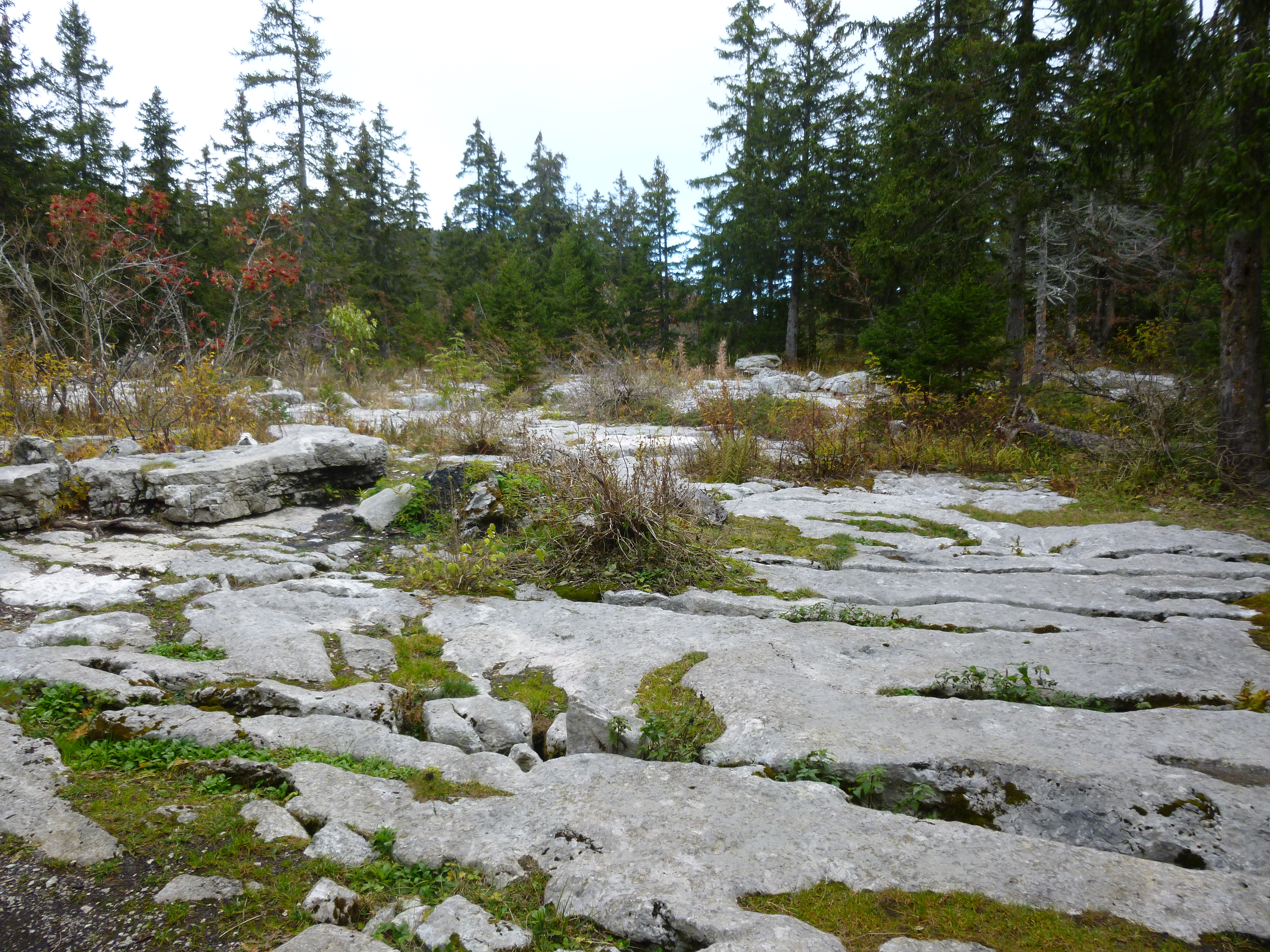
karst near the Gouffre Berger.

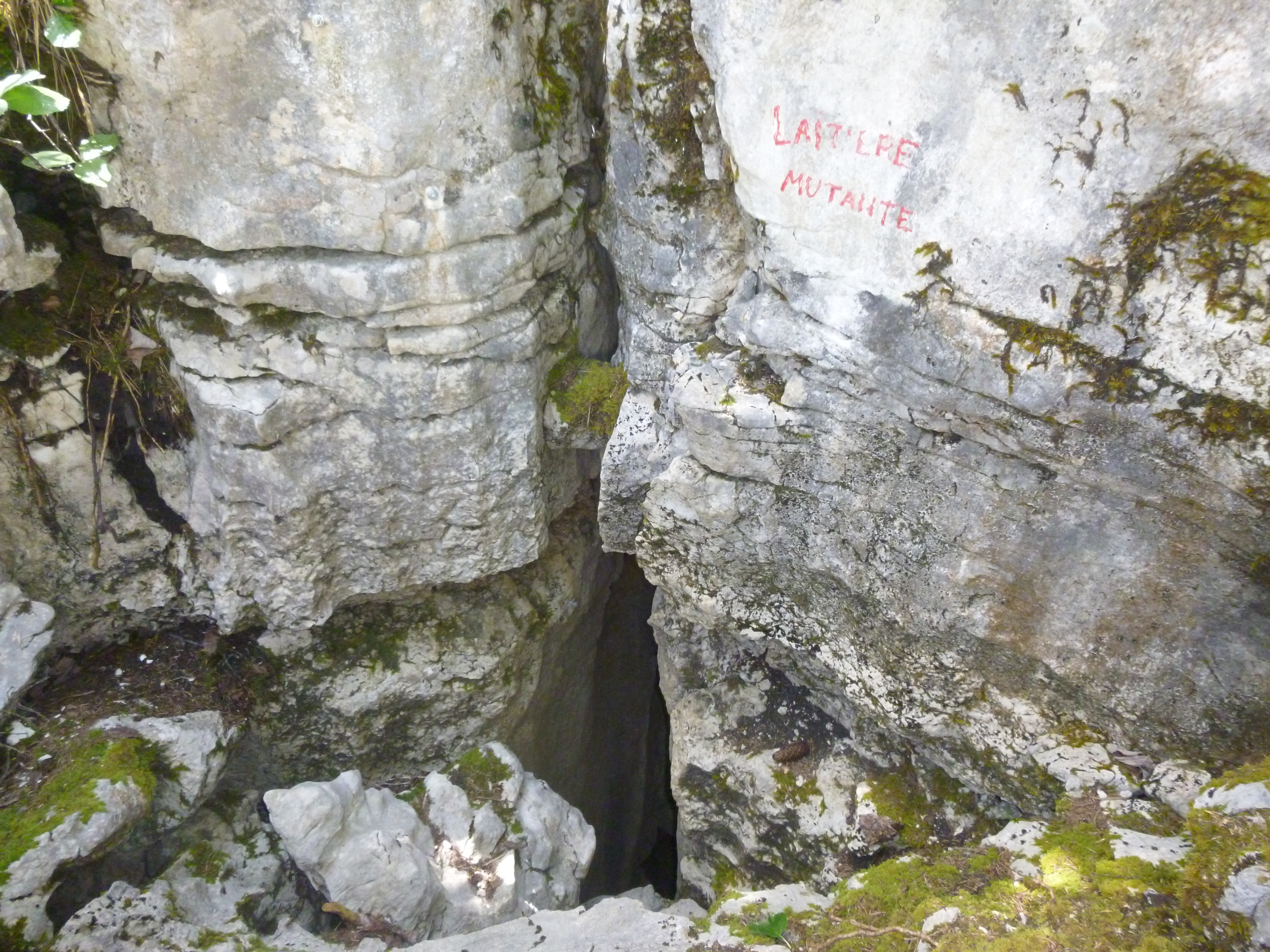
Entrance of "la Laitière Mutante".

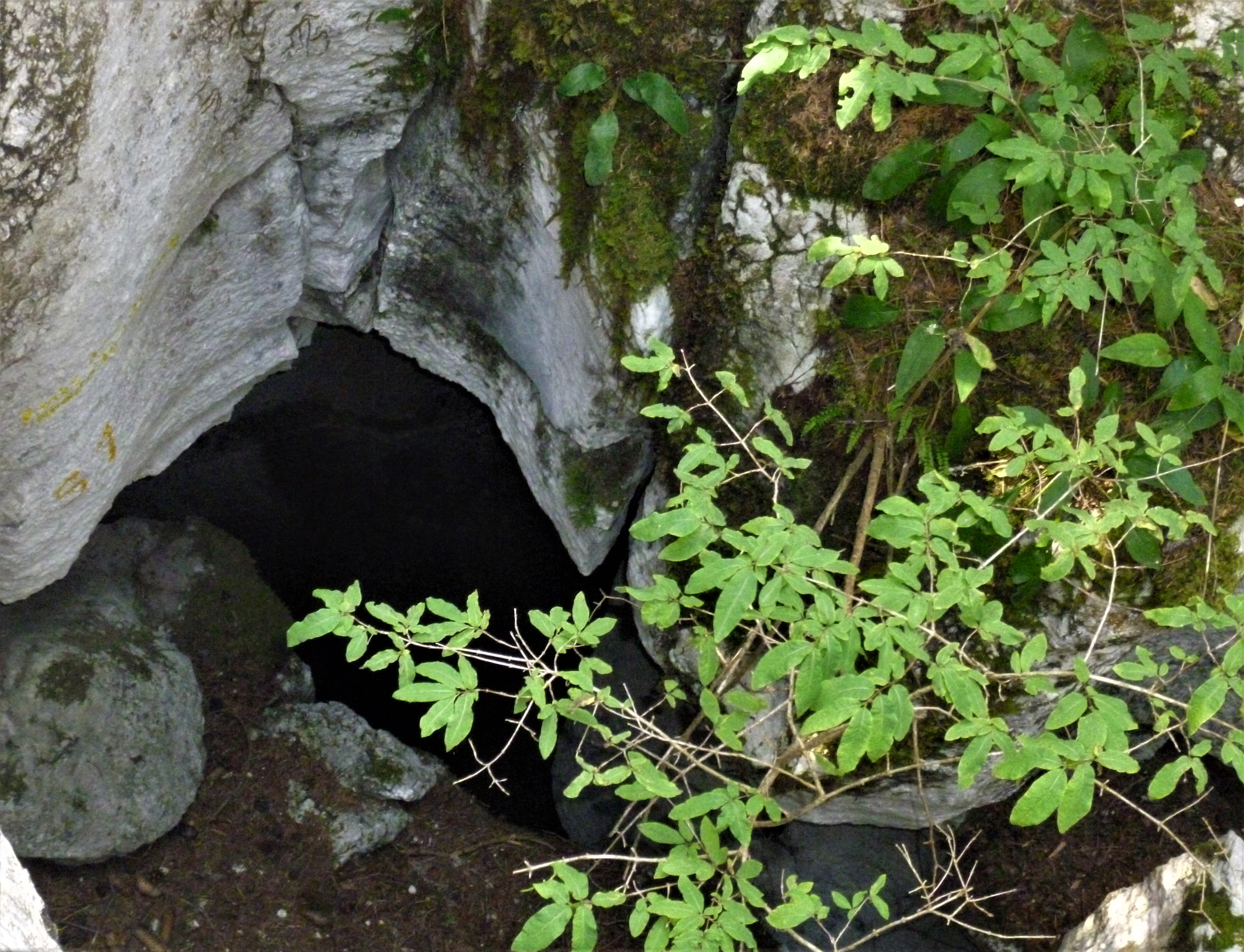
"Puits des Rhododendrons", second highest entrance.

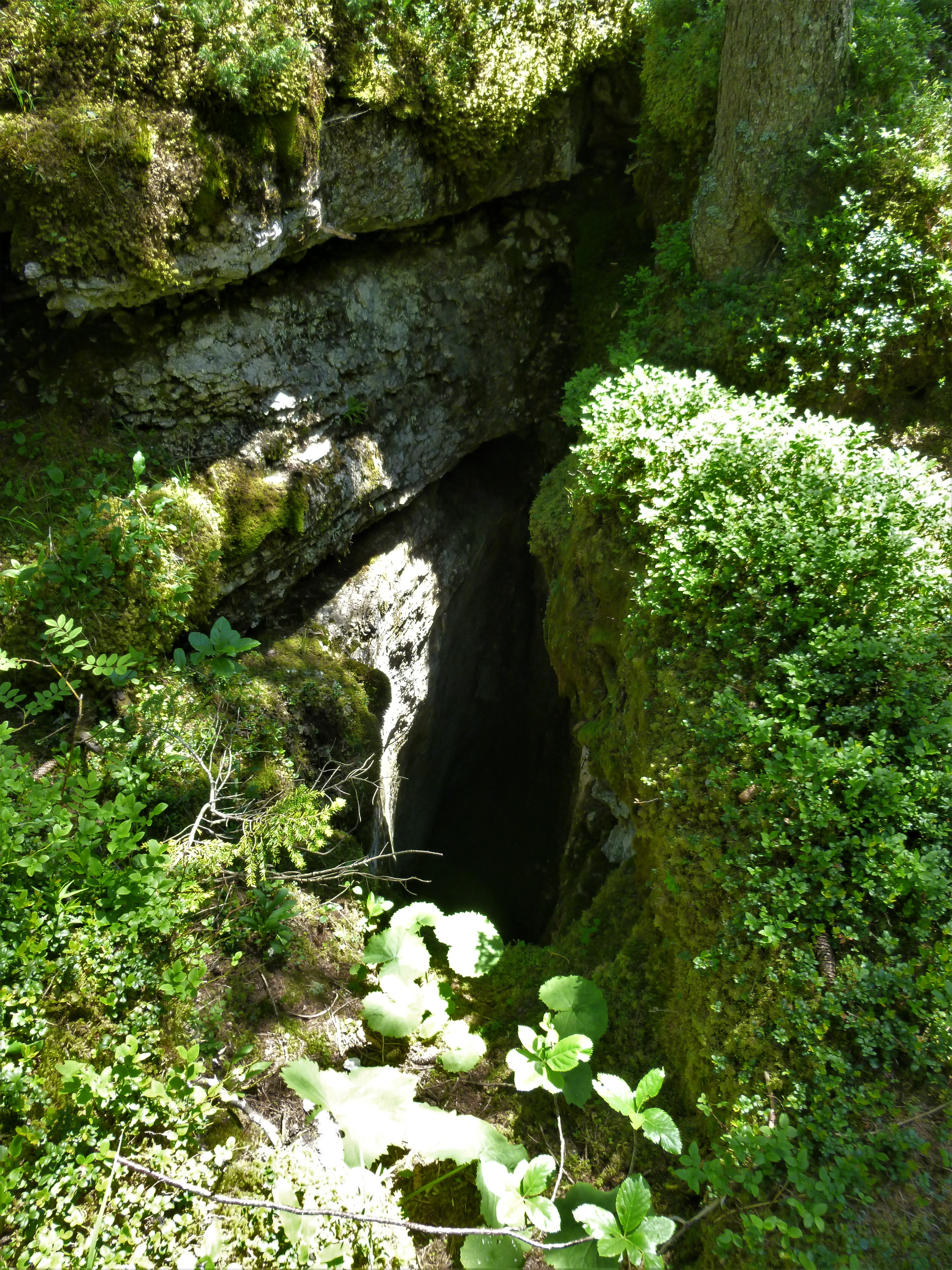
The "Puits Marry" is the first cave to connect to the Gouffre Berger.

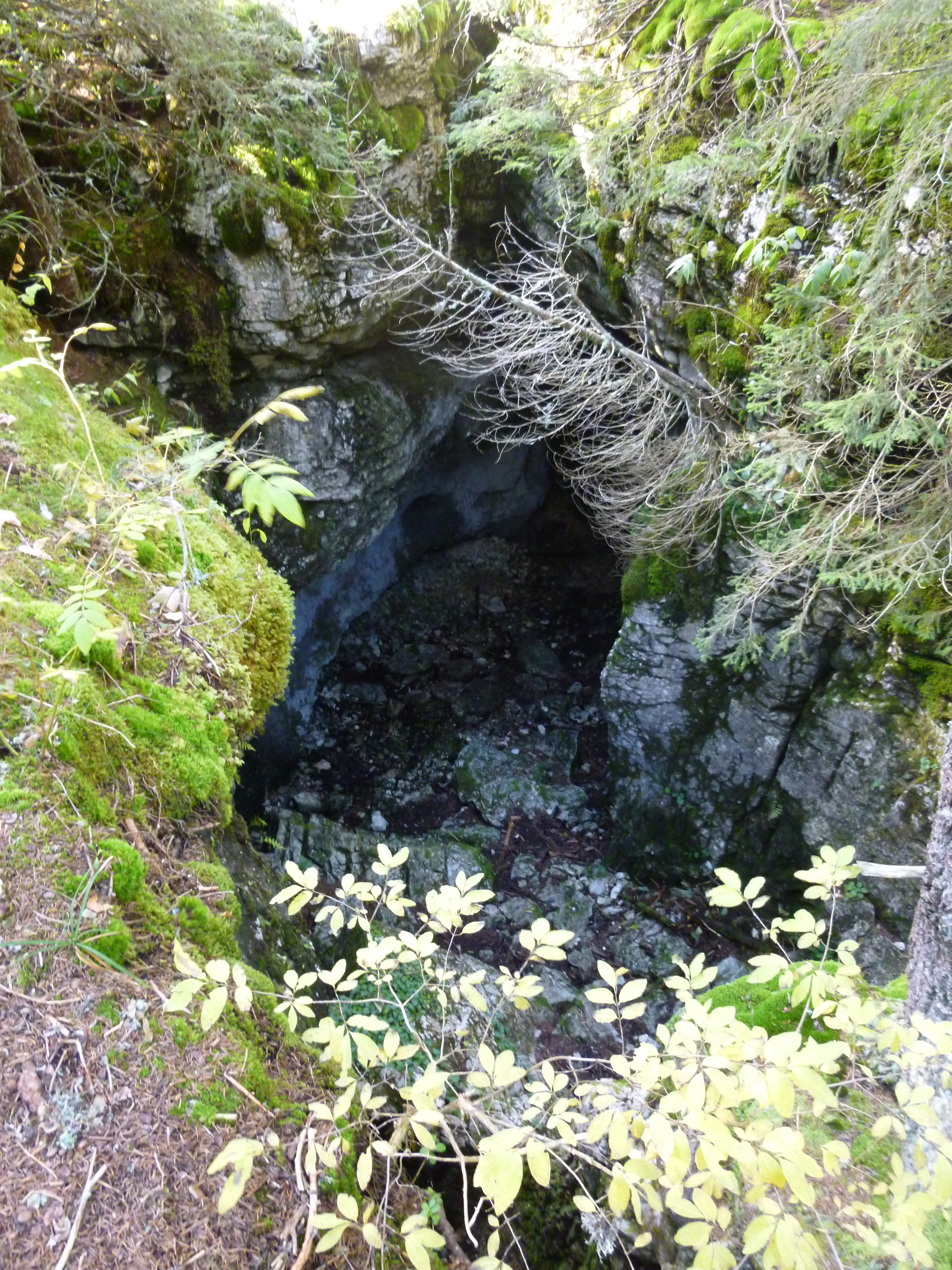
The "Gouffre de la Fromagère", the highest entrance.

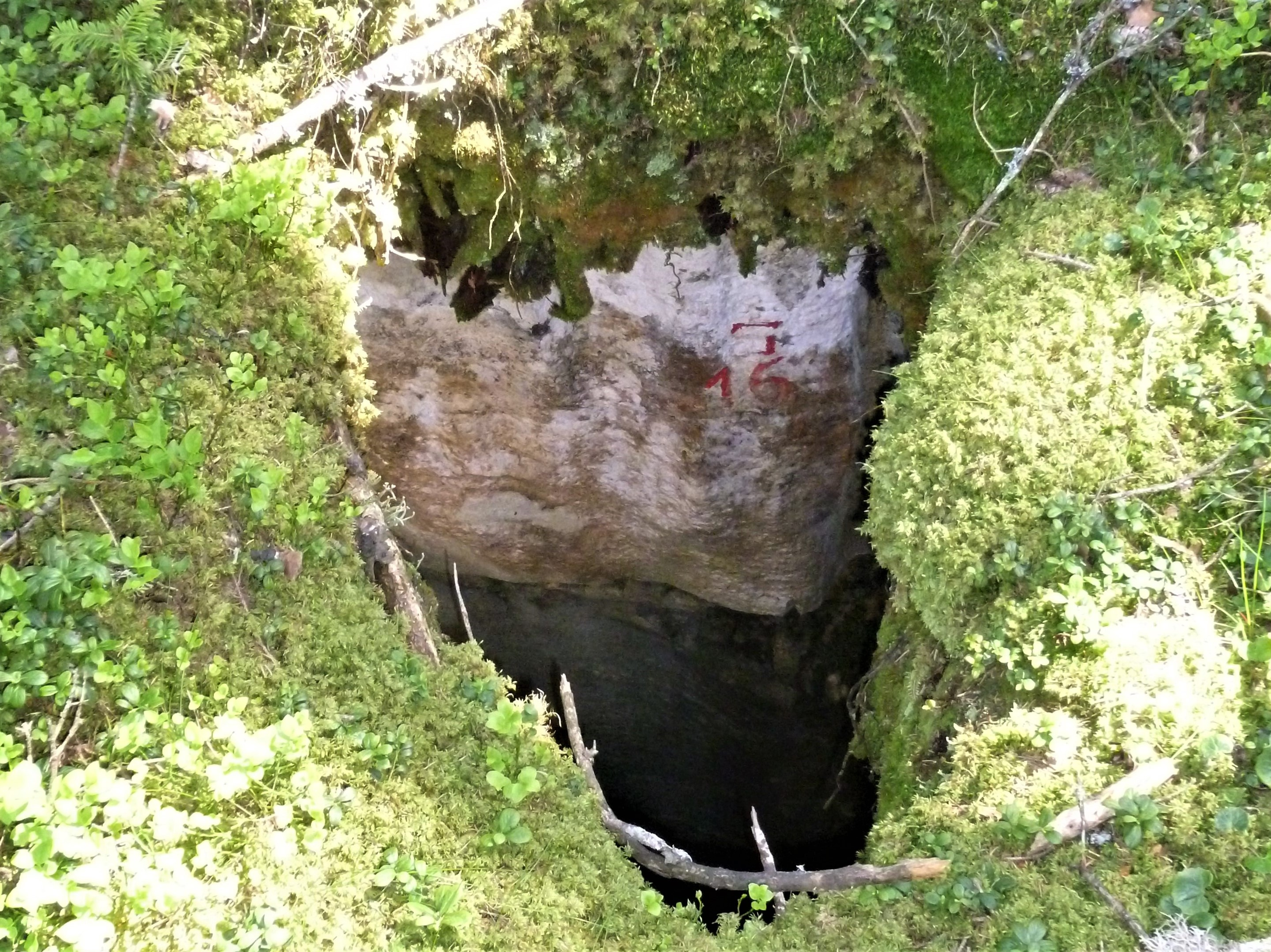
"Puits du Cheval Vapeur", connecting upstream of the "starless river".

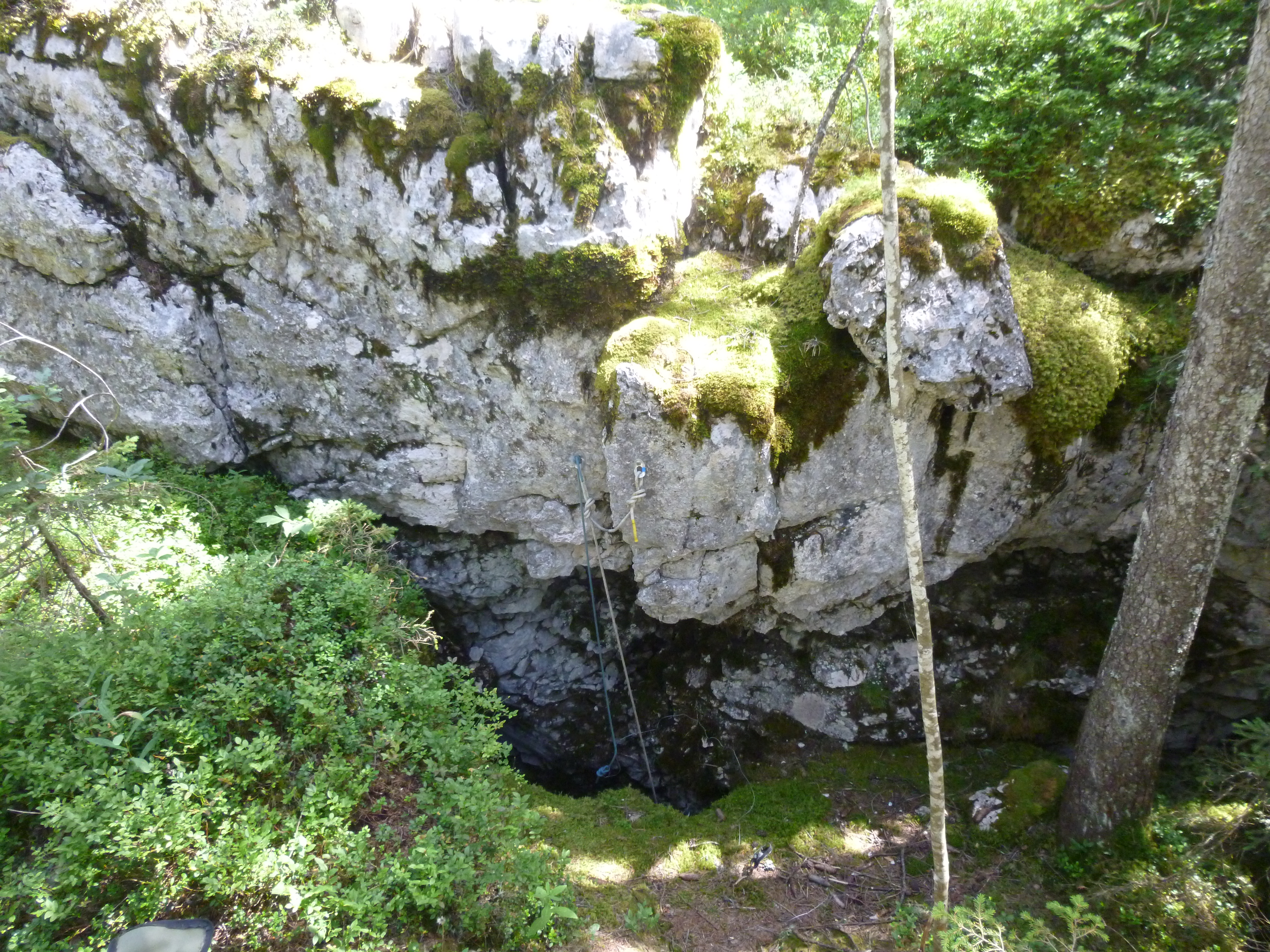
"Gouffre des Elfes" connected to the gallery Petzl.

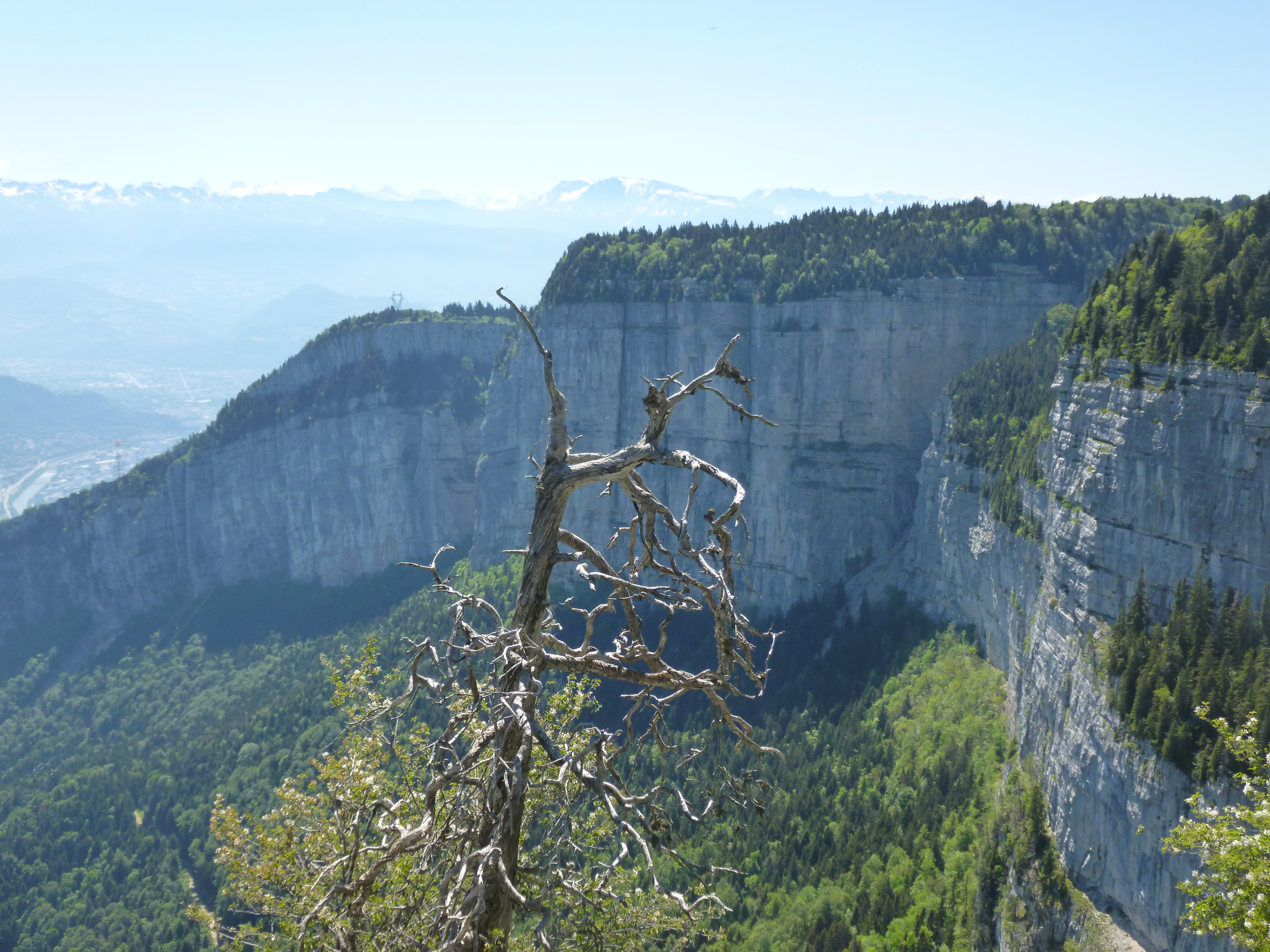
View of the cliffs of Sornin, in the background "l'oeil du Lapin" and the Grenoble bowl.

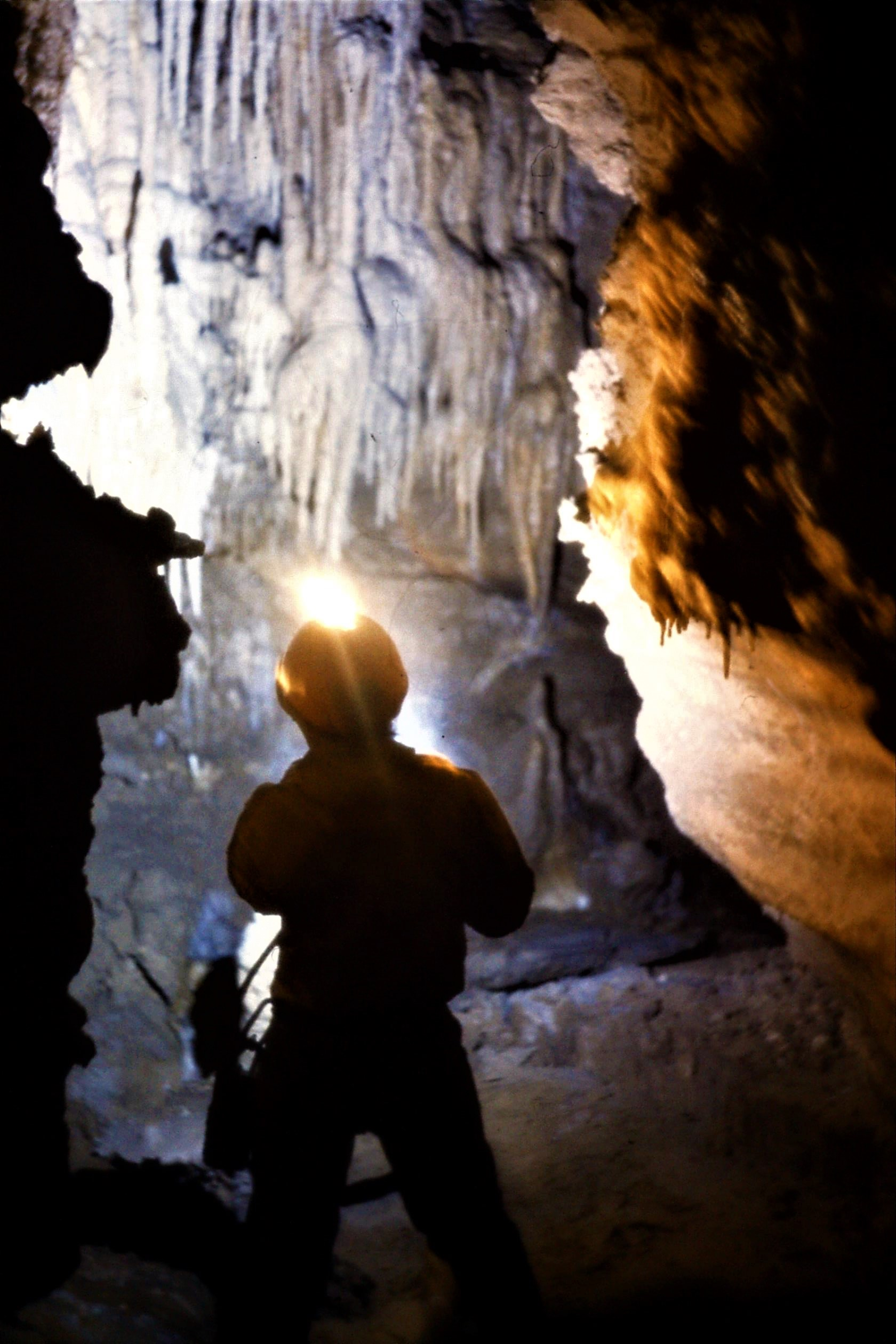
Méander in the "gouffre des Elfes".

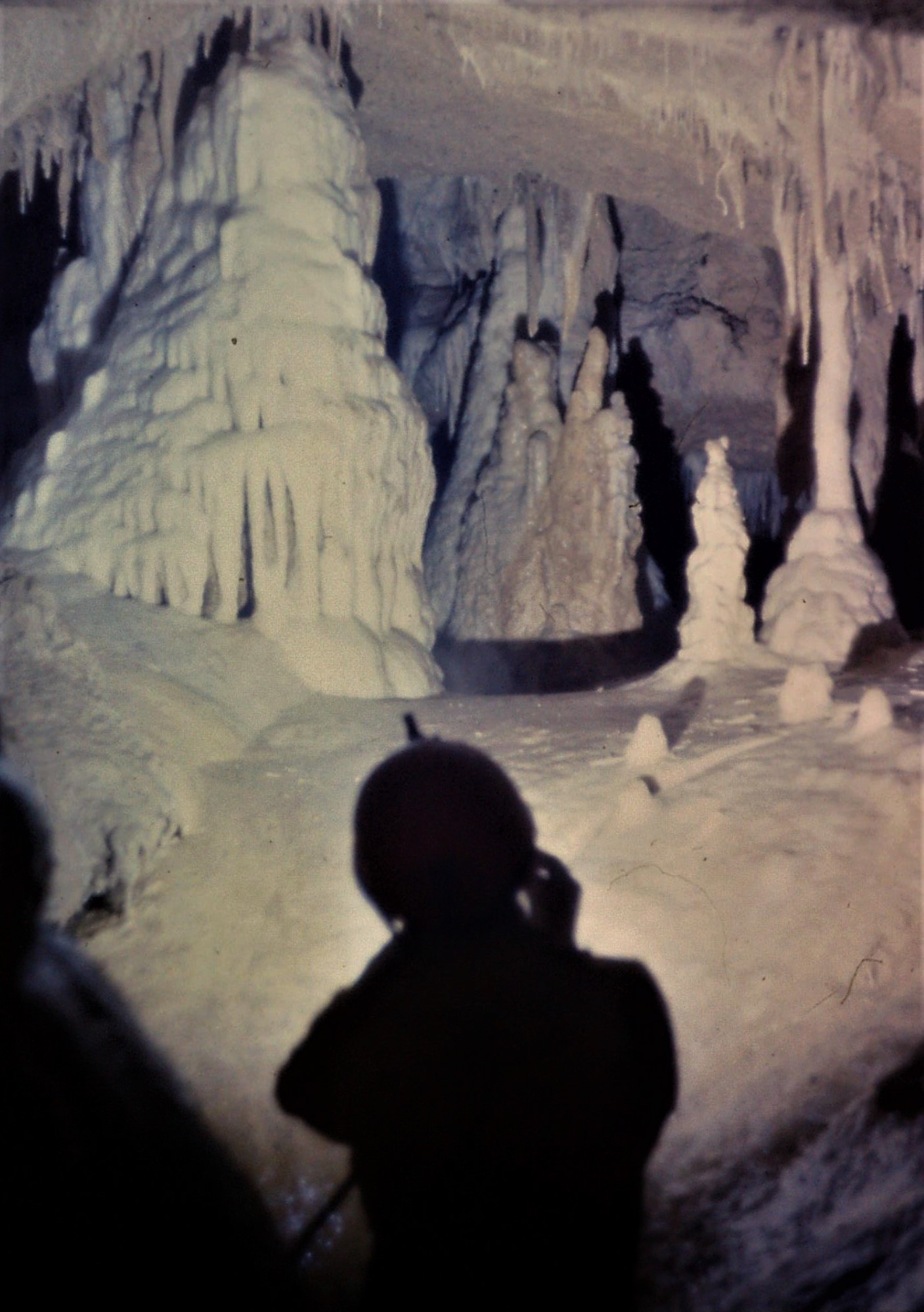
Stalagmite Pillar.

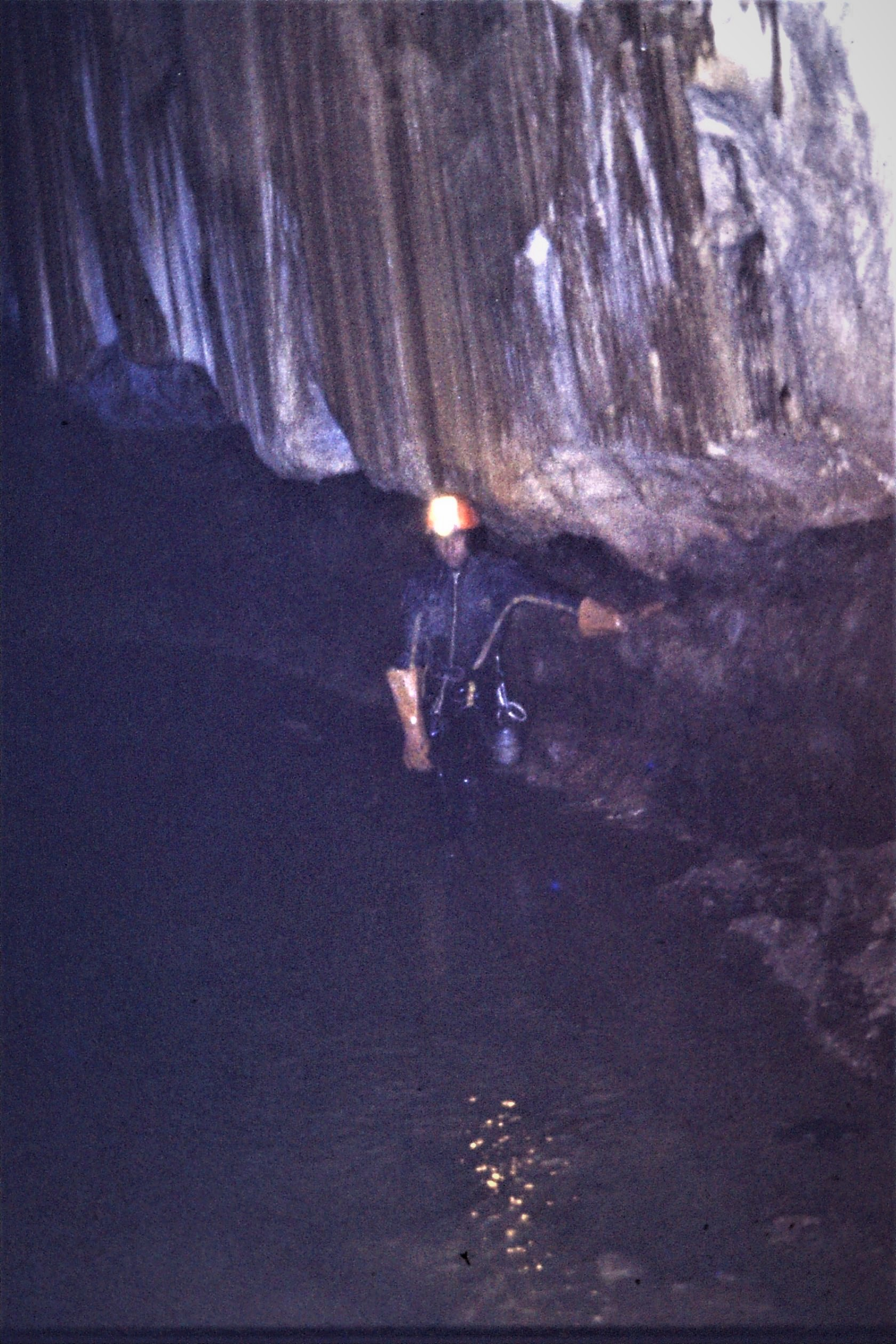
Progress in the mud gallery.

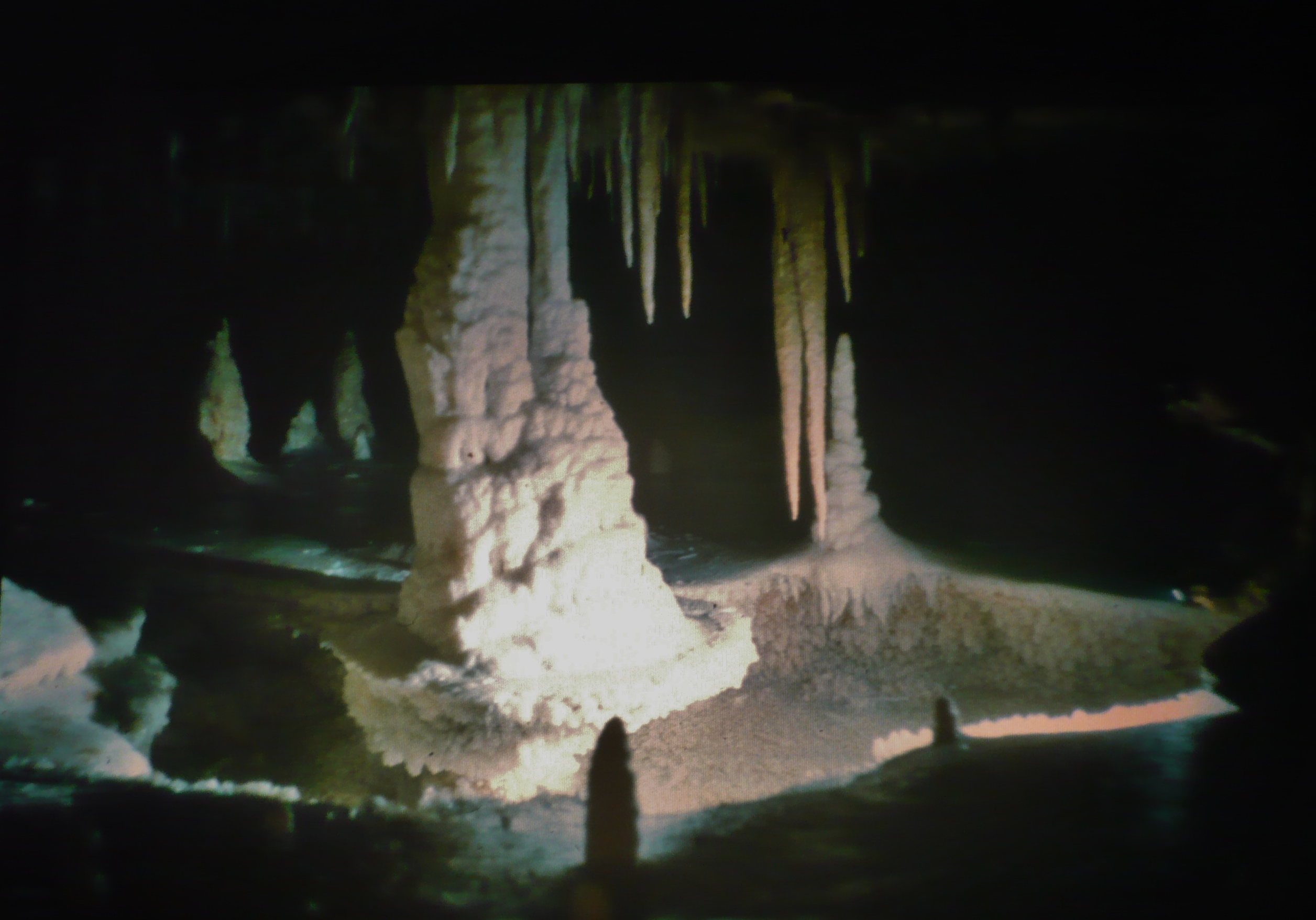
Rimstone.

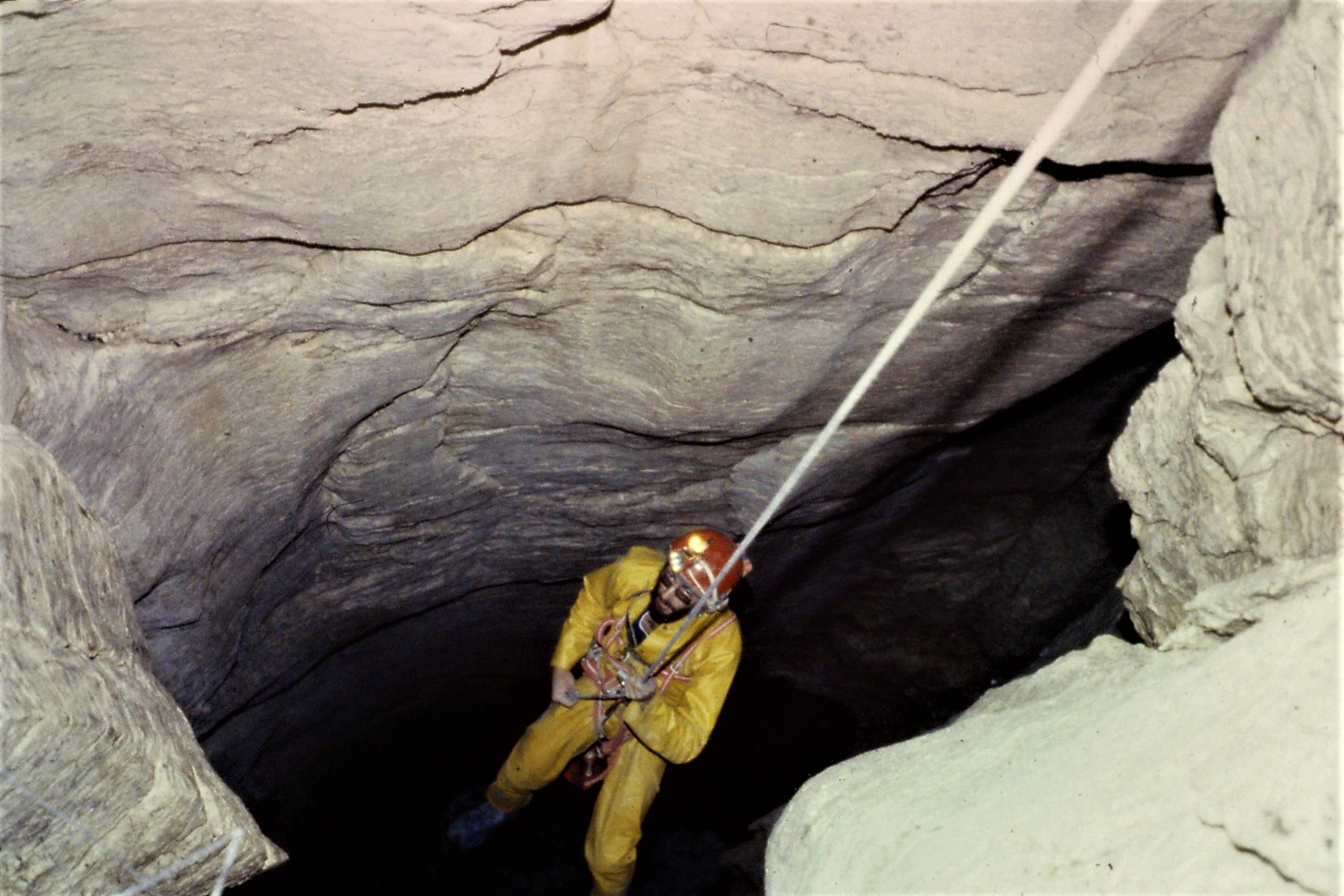
Pit Félix Ruiz de Arcaute, first pit of Gouffre Berger.

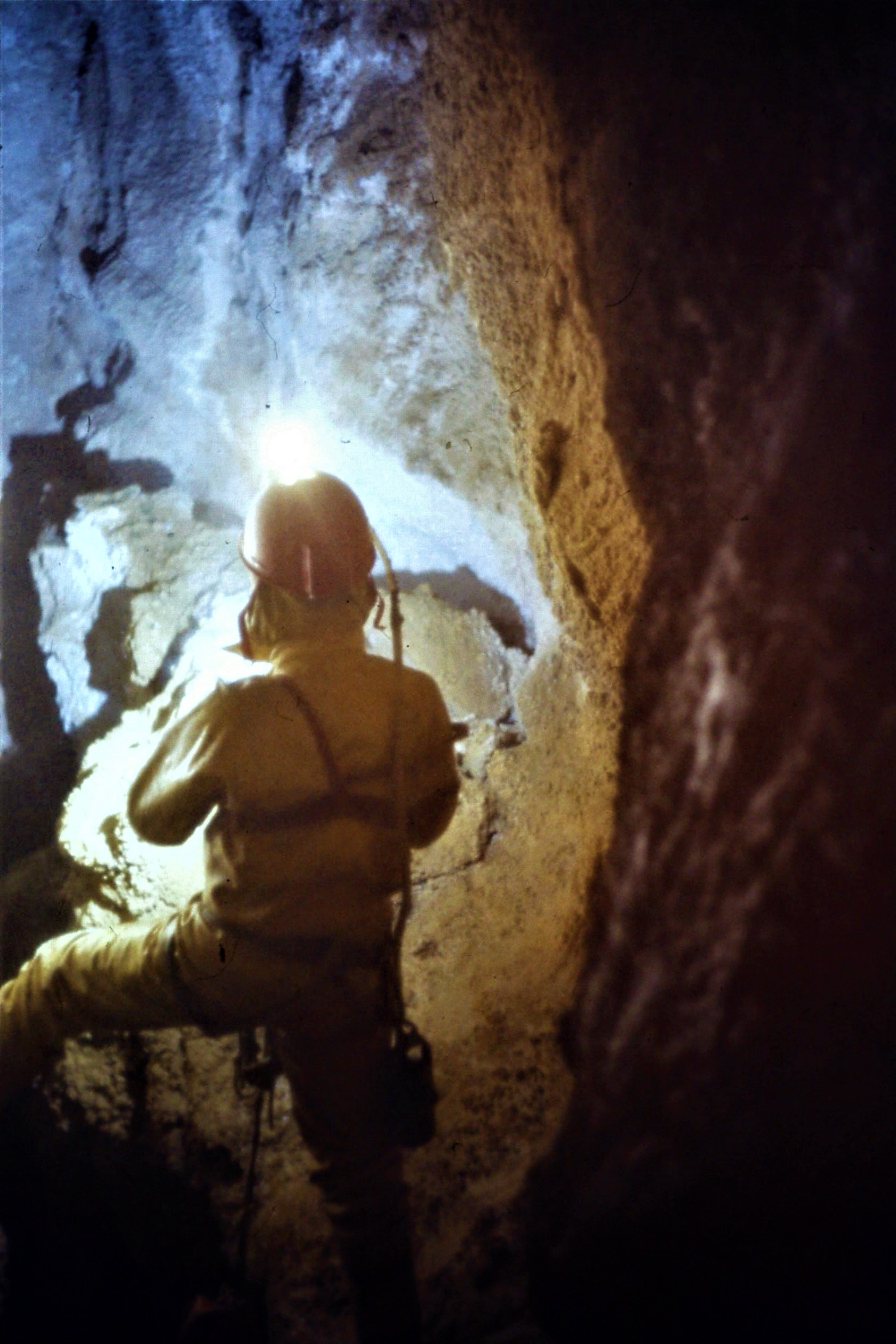
Concrete meander.

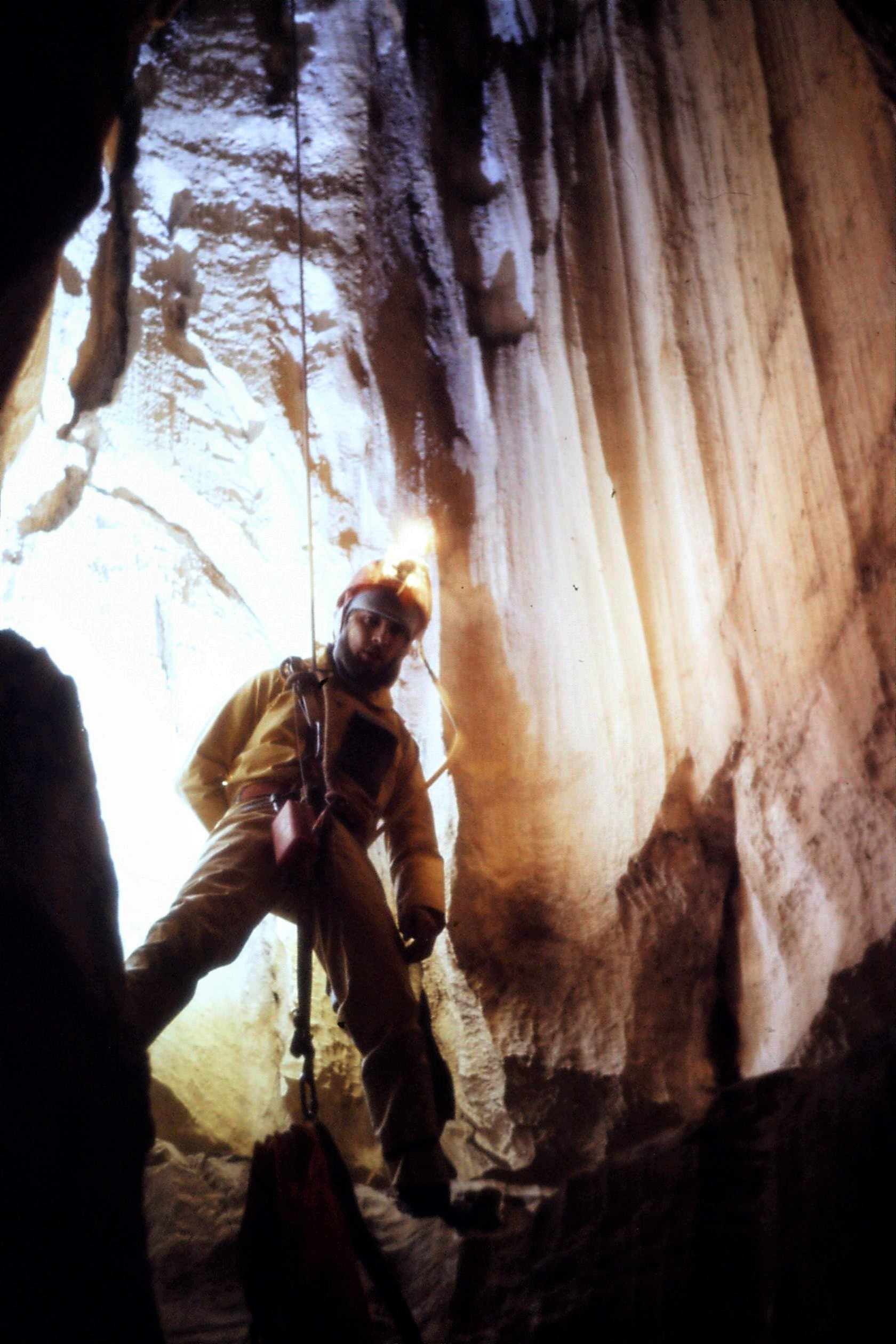
Pit with vertical grooves.

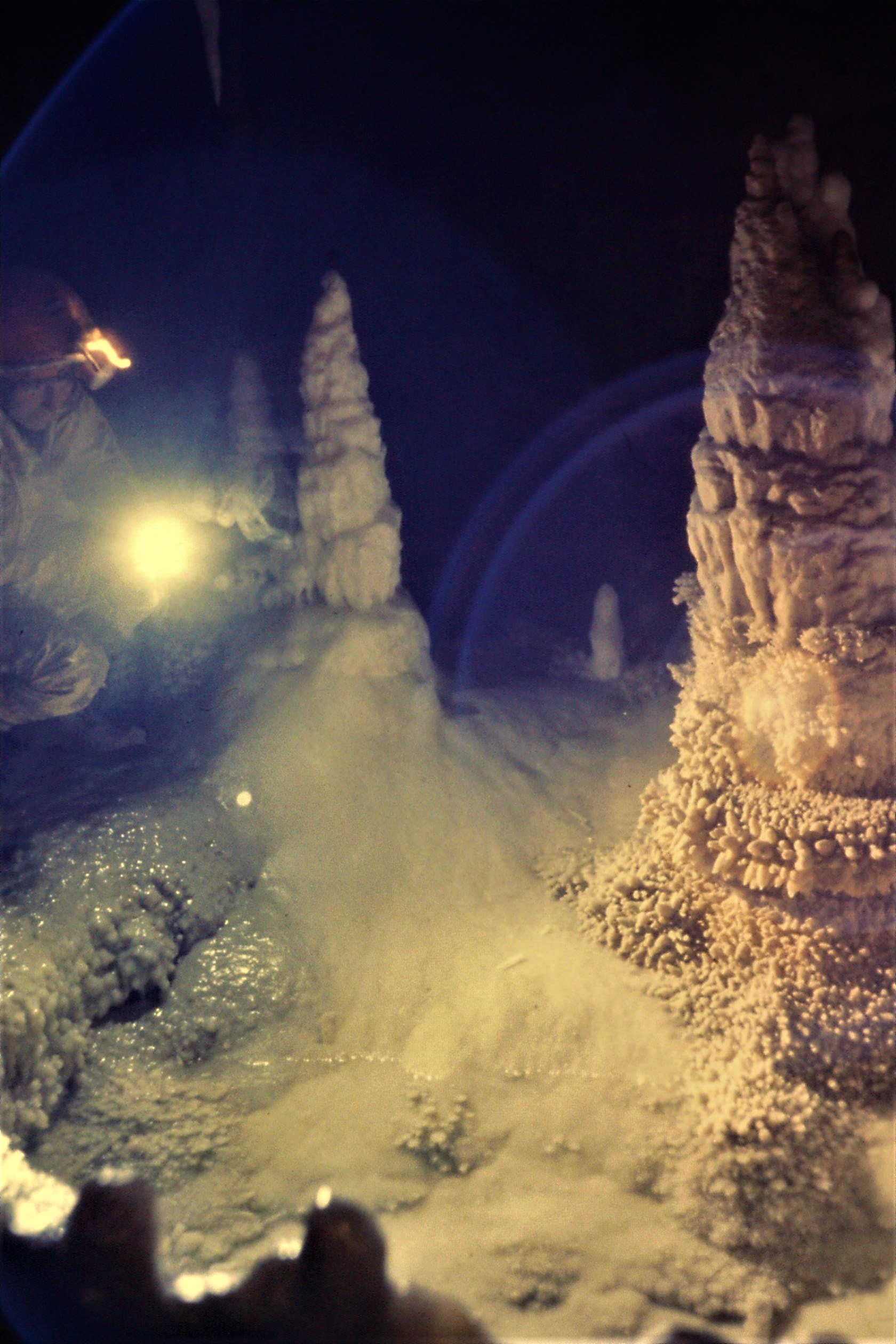
Review of a rimstone in the network "Biboc".

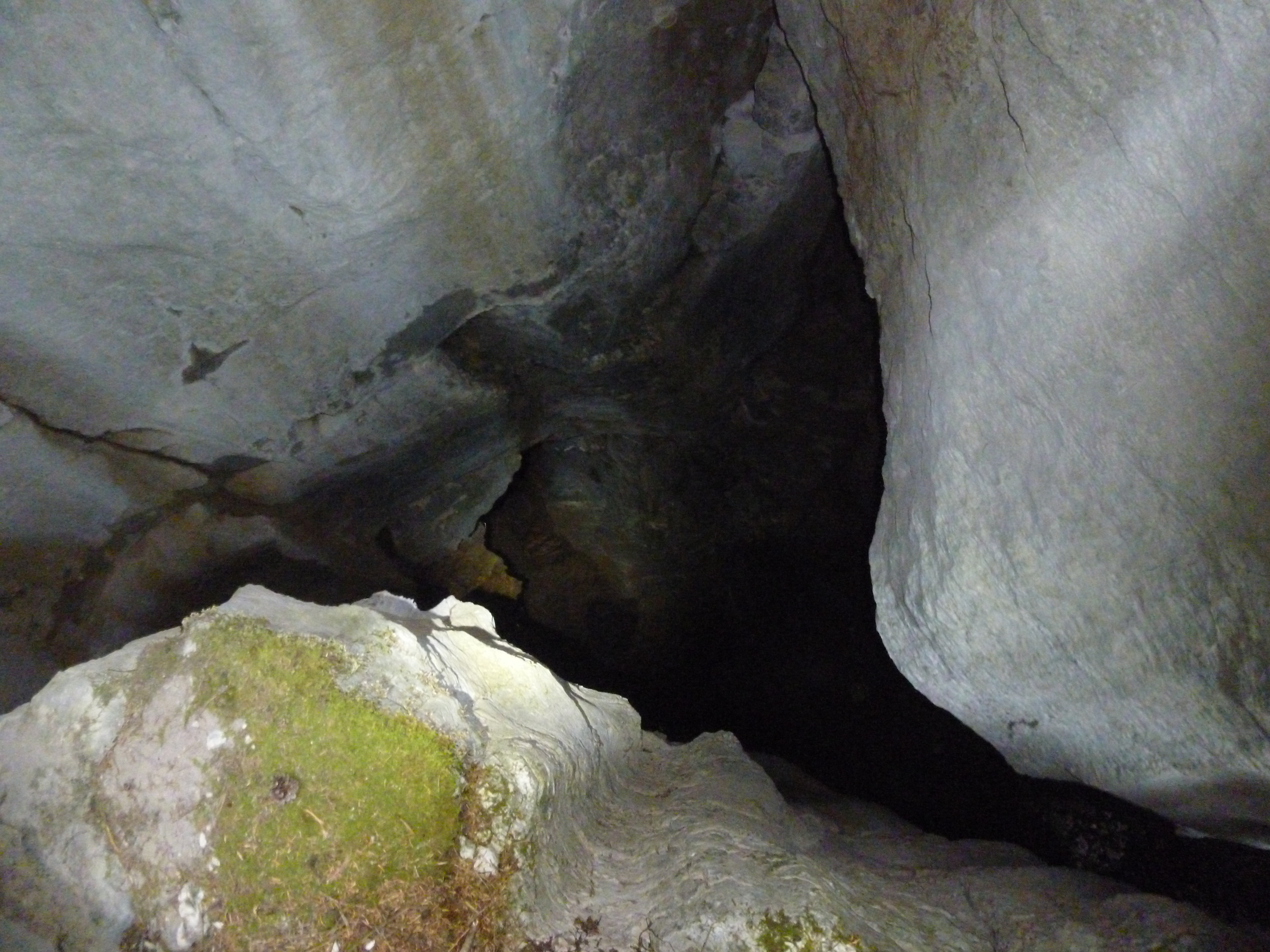
First shaft of "scialet des Rhododendrons".

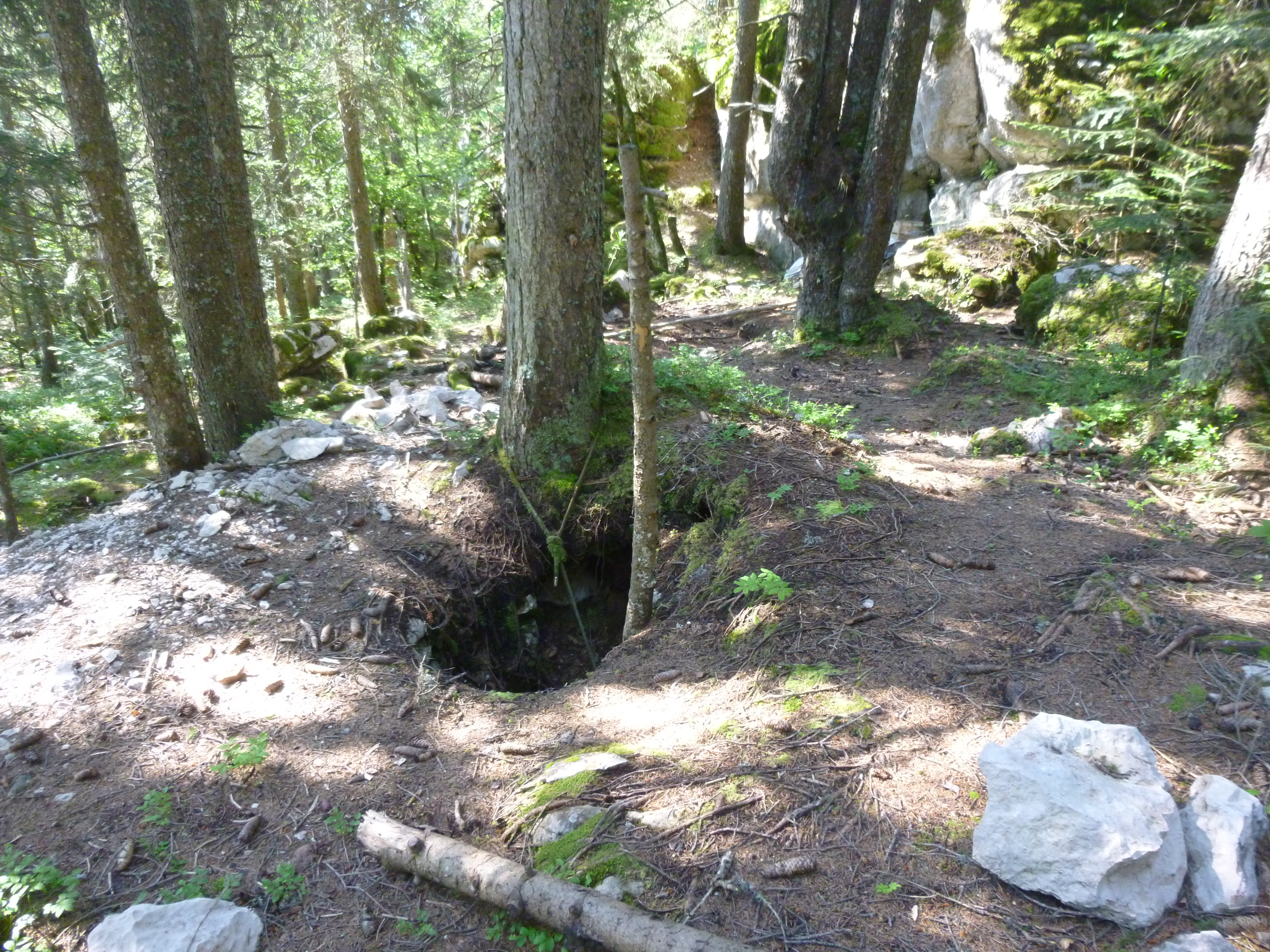
Le "Gouffre Delta 35" is the most-recently connected entrance to the Gouffre Berger system.

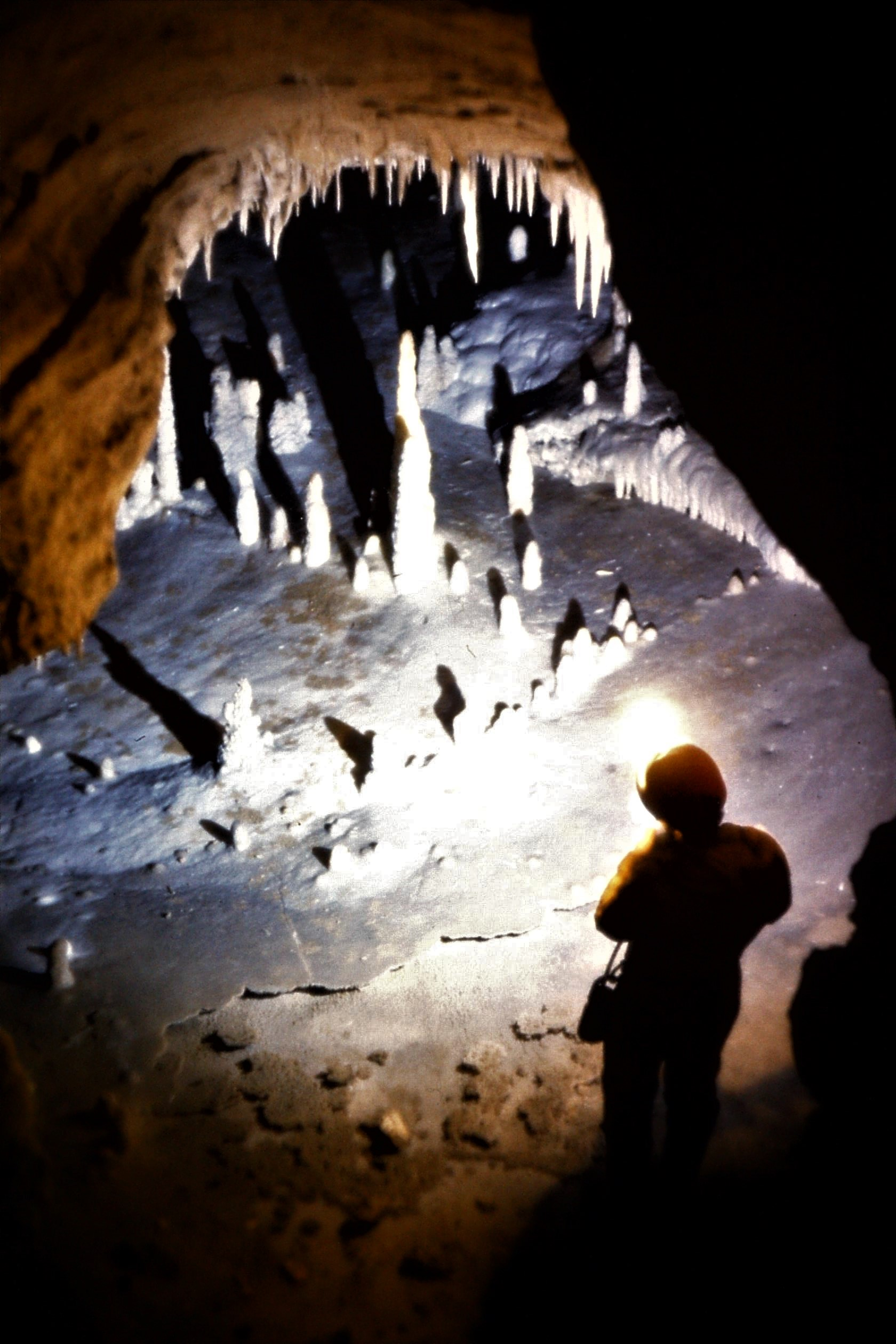
Underground gallery.

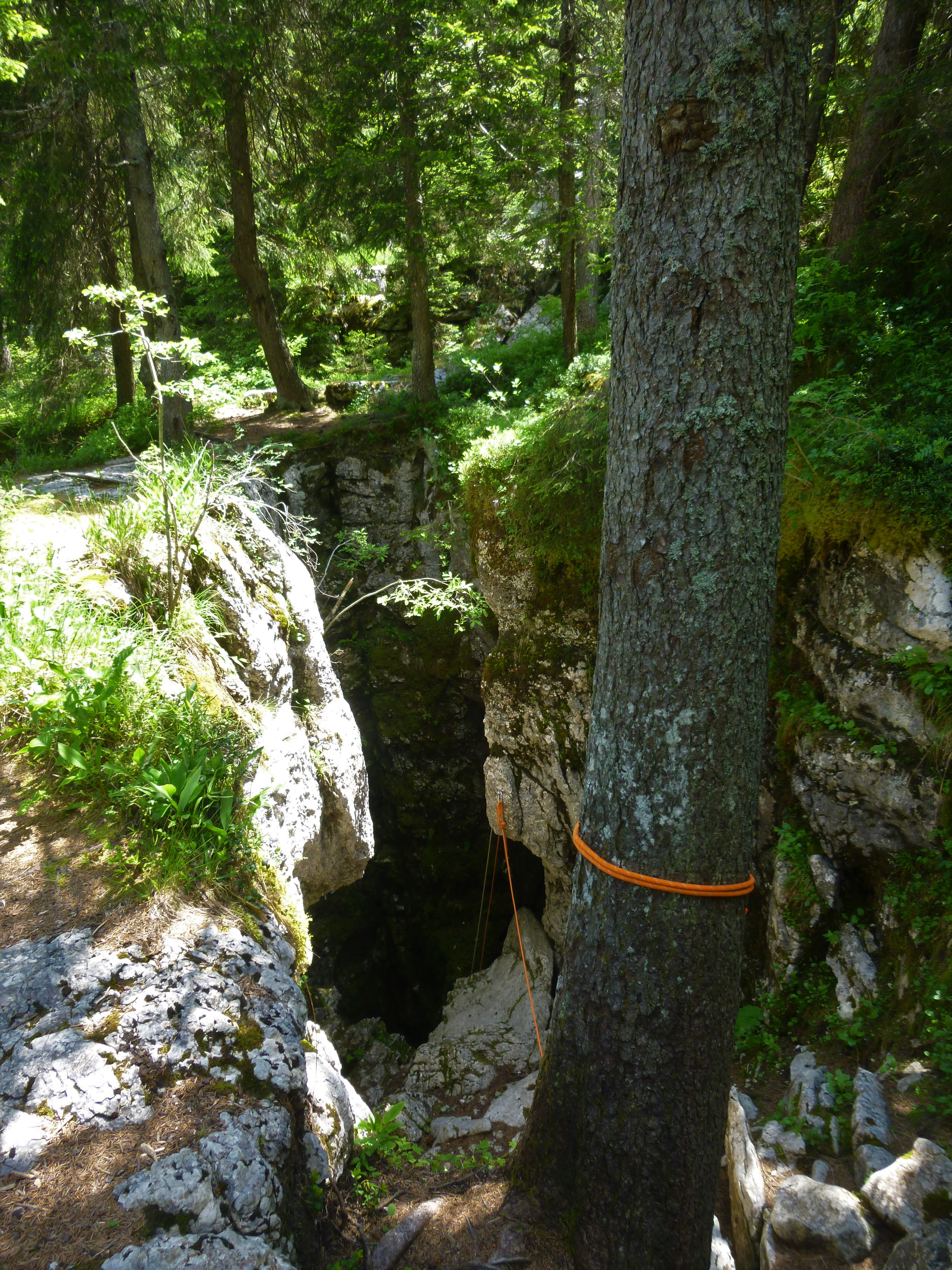
Le Gouffre Berger is a "classic" in the caving community.

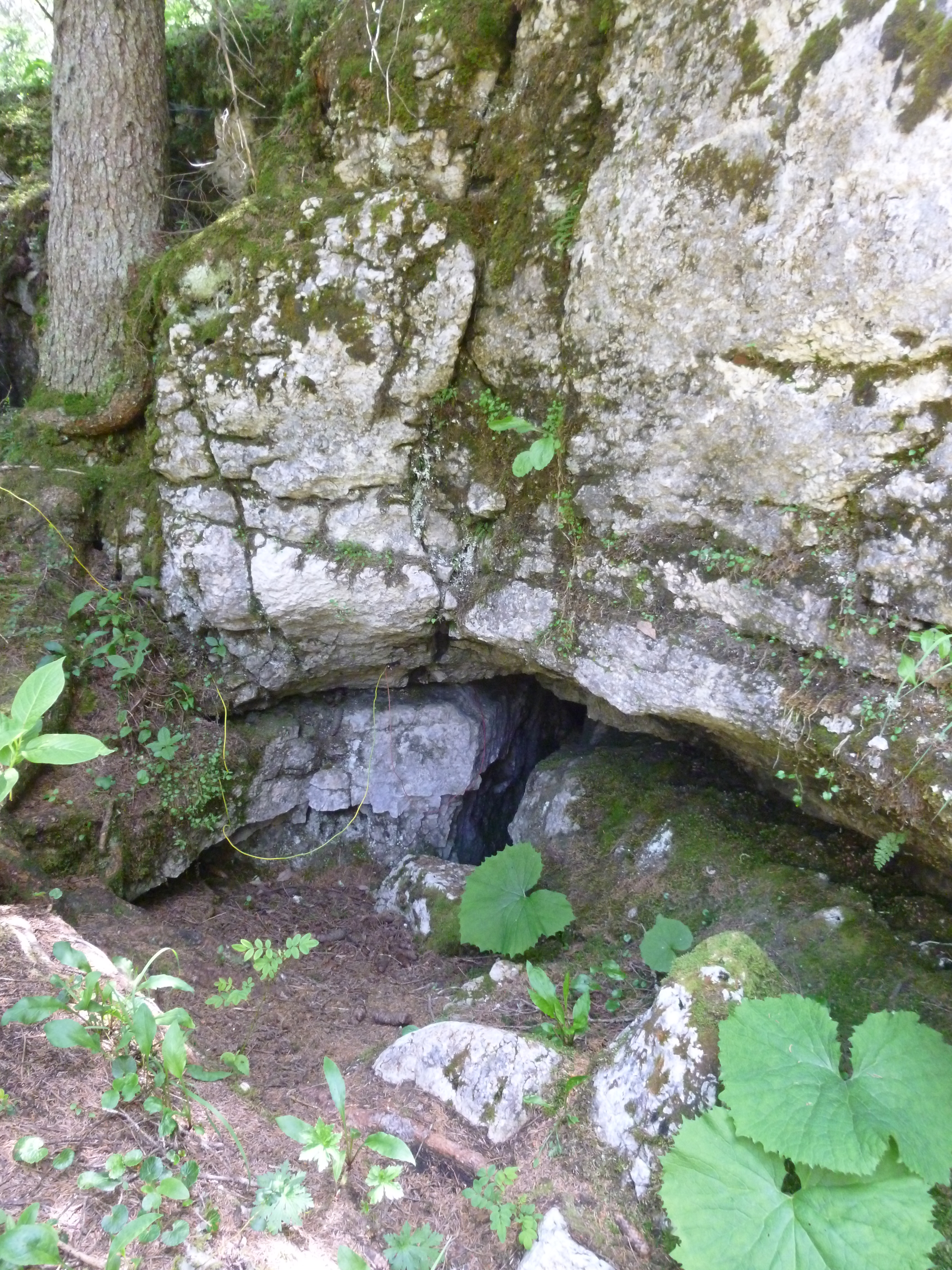
Le "Scialet du Cairn" falls back into le Gouffre Berger.

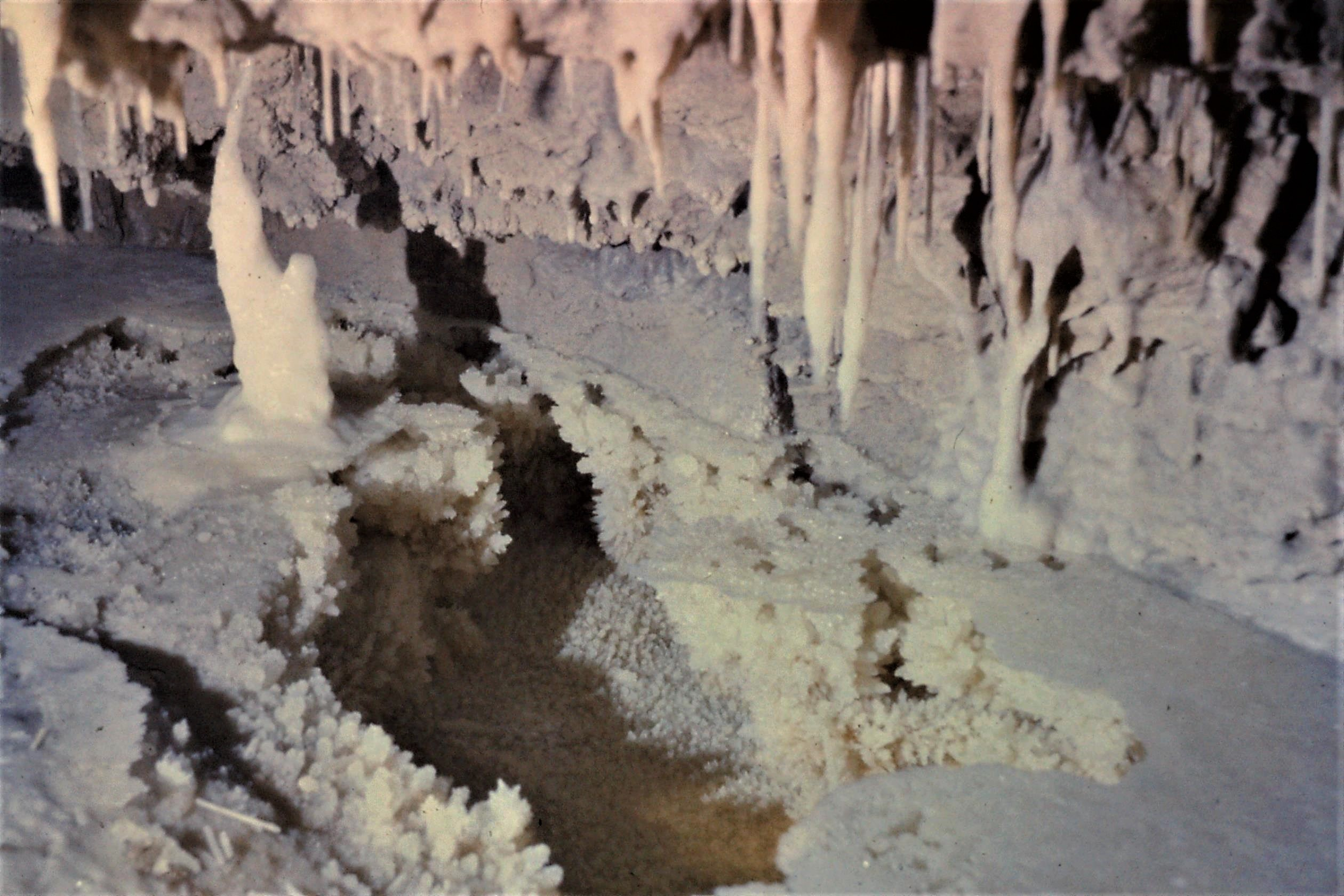
Detailed view of rimstone.

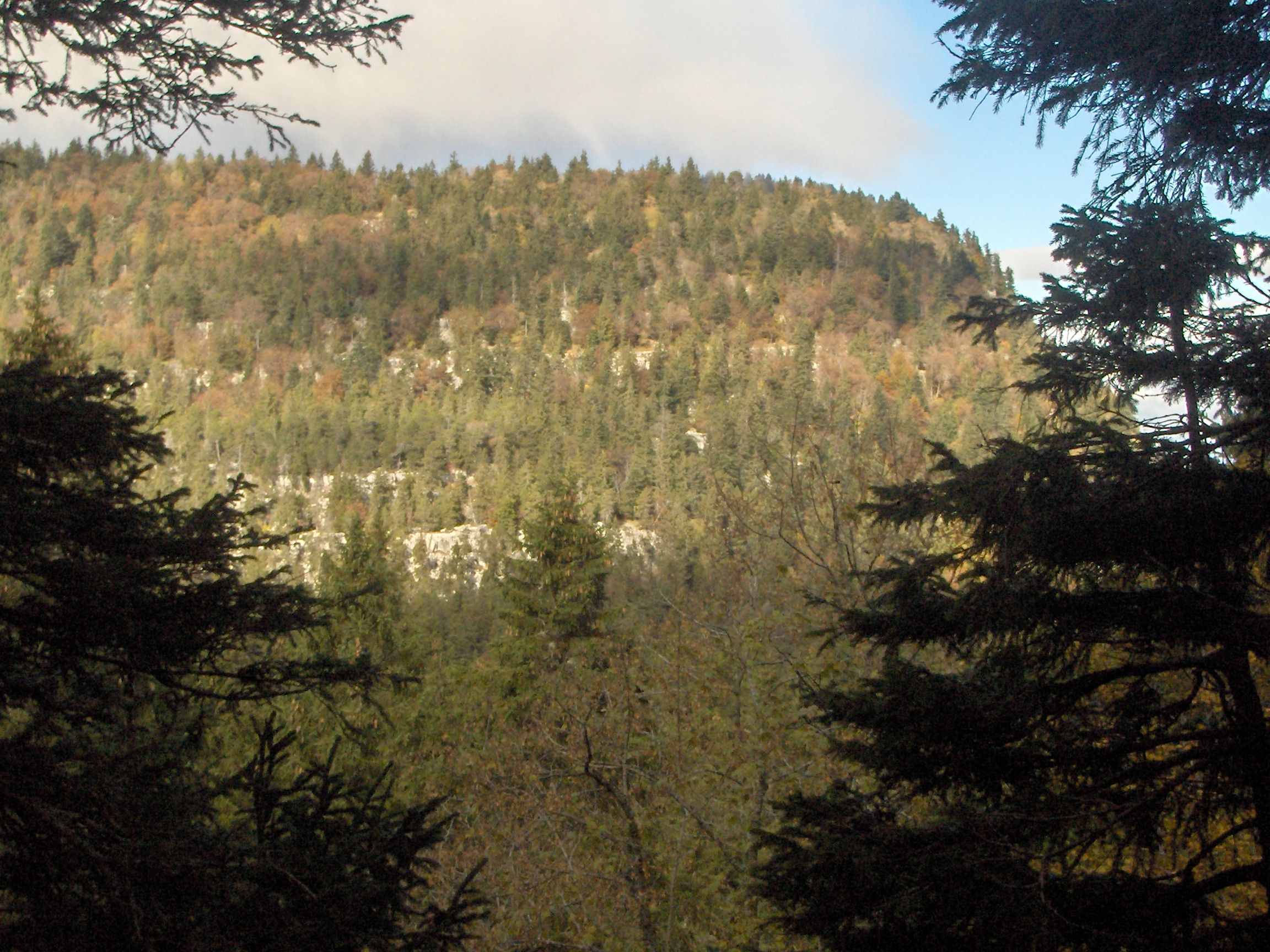
Sornin.

== See also ==
- Vercors Massif
- List of deepest caves

== Bibliography ==
- Opération -1000 by Jean Cadoux, Jean Lavigne, Géo Mathhieu, Louis Potié. - Grenoble : Edition de Grenoble, 1955.
- Réédition : Opération -1000, idem. - Marseille : Édition Jeann Lafitte. 261 pages; ISBN 9782862762326
- Marry, Georges (1977). Gouffre Berger premier – 1 000 [20 ans d'exploration] (in French). Saint-Hippolyte-du-Fort. p. 119..
- Gouffre Berger premier -1000. 1956-2016 by Serge Caillault. - Corenc, édition Spéléo Magazine 94. 36 pages; 2016; ISSN 1629-1573
- Gouffre Berger, l'esprit d'équipe by Mark Wright, Robbie Shone and others.- Sheffield: published by Vertebrate Publishing, 2014. 254 pages; ISBN 9781910240120
- Histoire d'une équipe 1941-1956 : Gouffre Berger. Premier -1 000 [a team's history 1941-1956 by Founders du SGCAF] (in French). Albertville. 2015. p. 293. ISBN 978-2-9554-8940-6..
- Envers et contre tout - Gouffre Berger 68 by Claude De Broyer, Philippe Delescaille, Alain Marbach, Georges Marbach and Lambert Martin-Bruxelles: published by Librairie Spéléo; mai 2020; 216 pages; ISBN 978-2-95039-765-2.
