= Fernand Petzl =

World-renowned caver and manufacturer of outdoor equipment under the brand name Petzl

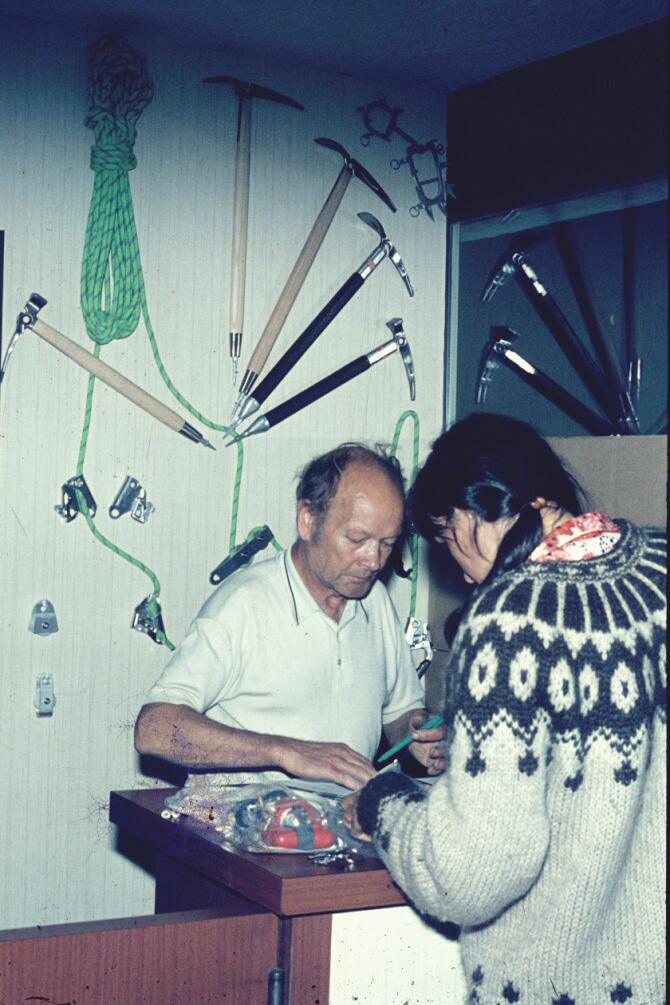
- Fernand Petzl in 1979
- Born: 7 April 1913
- Died: 31 May 2003 (aged 90); Grenoble
- Known for: Speleology

Fernand Petzl (April 7, 1913 – May 31, 2003) was a caver and manufacturer of outdoor equipment under the brand name Petzl.

Petzl lived most of his life in the village of Saint-Ismier (near Grenoble), France at the foot of the mountain Dent De Crolles. He first went caving at age 17 in Trou du Glaz in 1933, and was immediately captivated by the idea of exploring beyond the cave's known limits. Subsequent explorations there with Pierre Chevalier, Charles Petit-Didier and others culminated in connections to other caves in the massif, forming the Réseau de la Dent de Crolles which, in 1947, became the deepest known cave in the world. Petzl also participated in explorations in the Gouffre Berger, which set a new world depth record in 1956 as the first cave deeper than 1000 metres (-1122m). Petzl was a proponent of cave explorations by small teams, an innovation at the time.

During this period, when there were no manufacturers of specialized caving equipment, cavers adapted equipment from other sources, or made their own. After 1933 Petzl began making rope ladders for his own use, developed a scaling-pole in 1940, and began testing the first nylon ropes in 1942. In 1968 Bruno Dressler asked Petzl, who worked as a metals machinist, to build a rope-ascending tool he had developed, and in the 1970s Petzl started a small caving equipment manufacturing company that bore his name. In subsequent years the Petzl brand was expanded to include climbing and ski-mountaineering gear, and continues today as one of the world's best–known manufacturers of mountaineering equipment.
