= Engins =

- Commune
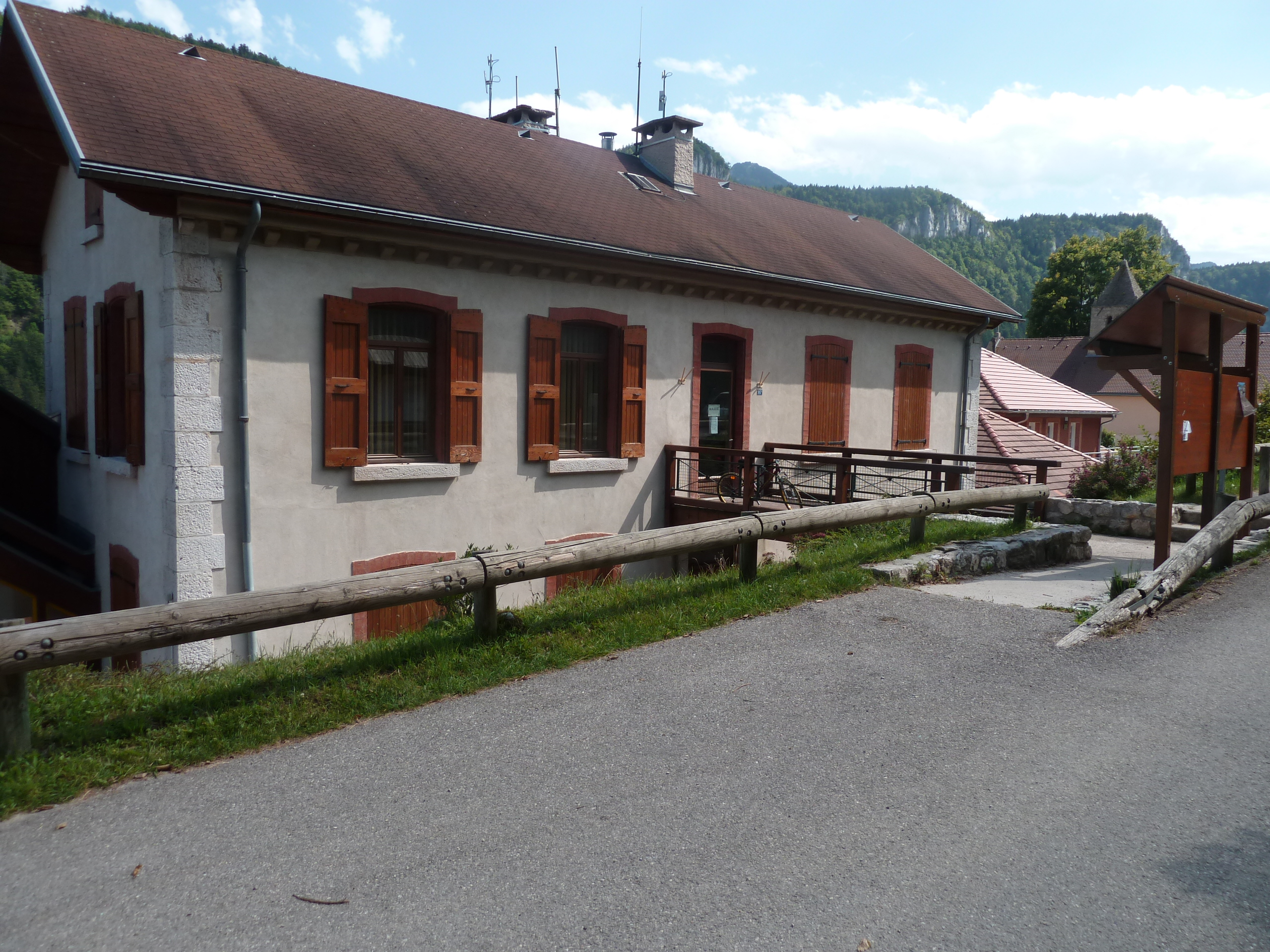
- Town hall
- Location of Engins
- Location within France Location within Auvergne-Rhône-Alpes
- Coordinates: 45°10′55″N 5°37′03″E
- Country: France
- Region: Auvergne-Rhône-Alpes
- Department: Isère
- Arrondissement: Grenoble
- Canton: Fontaine-Vercors
- Intercommunality: Massif du Vercors

Government
  - Mayor (2020–2026): Stéphane Falco
- Area^{1}: 21 km^{2} (8.1 sq mi)
- Highest elevation: 2,064 m (6,772 ft)
- Lowest elevation: 560 m (1,840 ft)
- Population (2023): 422
  - Density: 20/km^{2} (52/sq mi)
- Time zone: UTC+01:00 (CET)
  - Summer (DST): UTC+02:00 (CEST)
- INSEE/Postal code: 38153 /38360
- ^{1} French Land Register data, which excludes lakes, ponds, glaciers > 1 km^{2} (0.386 sq mi or 247 acres) and river estuaries.

Engins (French pronunciation: [ɑ̃ʒɛ̃]) is a commune in the Isère department in southeastern France.

== Population ==
Historical population
| Year | Pop. | ±% p.a. |
|---|---|---|
| 1968 | 151 | — |
| 1975 | 151 | +0.00% |
| 1982 | 288 | +9.66% |
| 1990 | 352 | +2.54% |
| 1999 | 420 | +1.98% |
| 2007 | 481 | +1.71% |
| 2012 | 508 | +1.10% |
| 2017 | 465 | −1.75% |
| 2023 | 422 | −1.60% |
Source: INSEE

== See also ==
- Communes of the Isère department
- Parc naturel régional du Vercors
