= Machard =

Machard may refer to:

- Klemheist knot, also known as a French Machard knot
- Autoblock, also known as a Machard knot
- Prosecutor Machard, a character in the French television series Spiral
- Alfred Machard (1887-1962), French novelist and screenwriter
- Madame Machard, a character in the 1924 French film Mimi Pinson
- M. Machard, a character in the 1953 French film Le Chevalier de la nuit

== See also ==
- The Visions of Simone Machard
