= Tree climbing =

Ascending and moving around in the crown of trees

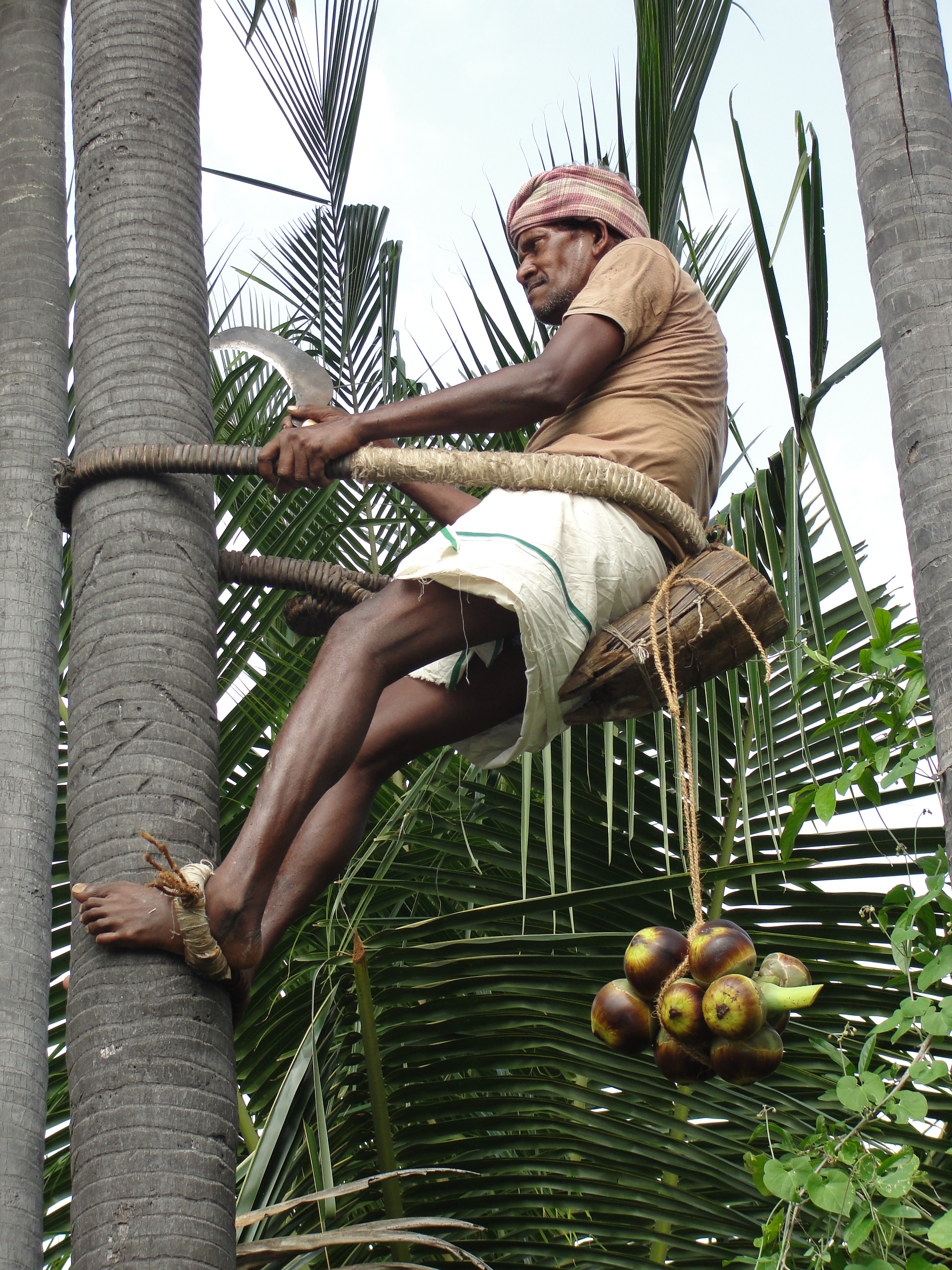
A man climbing a palmyra palm

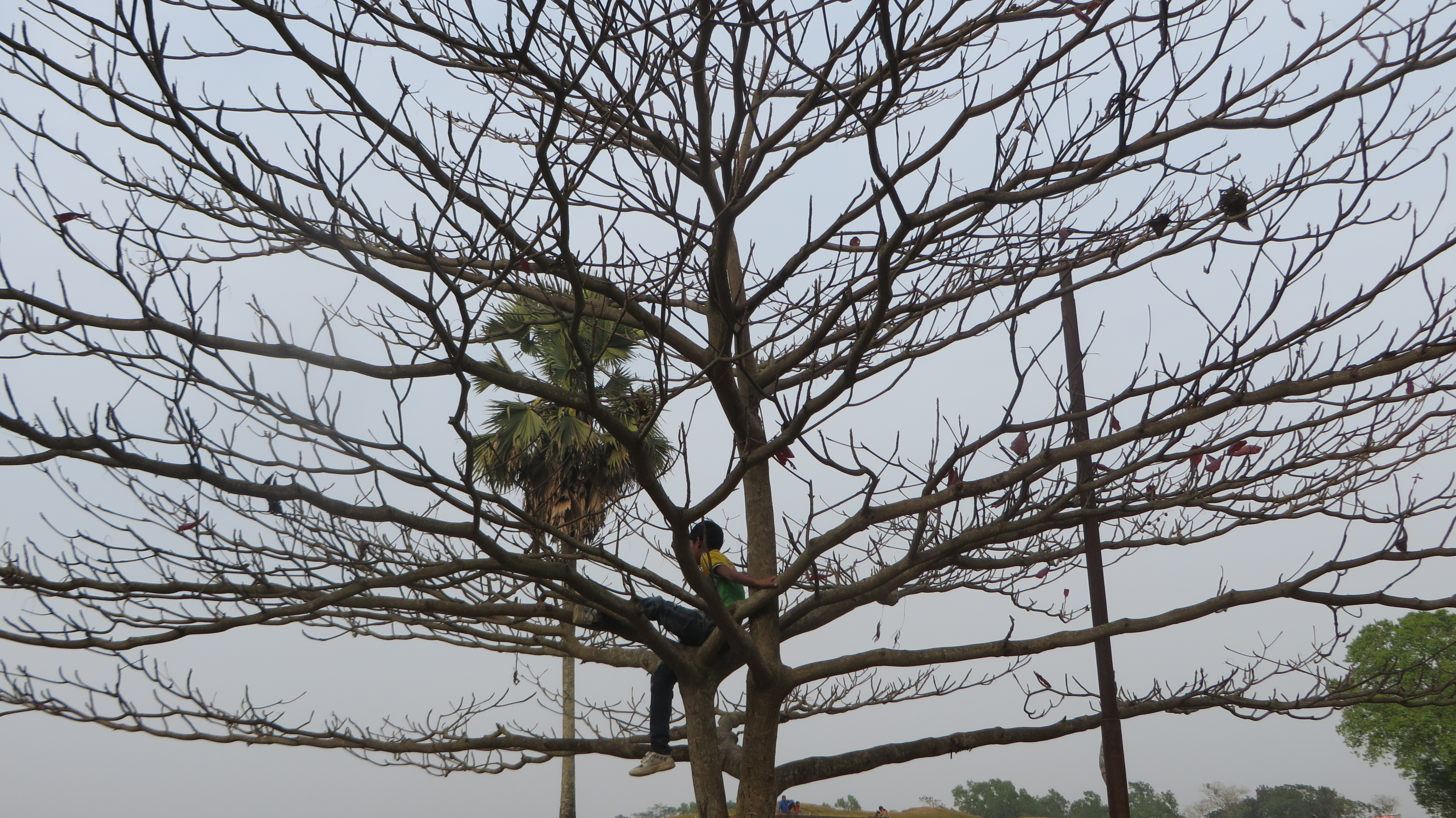
A boy sitting in a tree

Tree climbing is a recreational or functional activity consisting of ascending and moving around in the crowns of trees.

A rope, helmet, and harness can be used to increase the safety of the climber. Other equipment can also be used, depending on the experience and skill of the tree climber. Some tree climbers take special hammocks called "Treeboats" and Portaledges with them into canopies where they can have a picnic or sleep.

Some tree climbers employ a mixture of techniques and gear derived from rock climbing and caving. These techniques are also used to climb trees for other purposes: tree care (arborists), animal rescue, research, and activism.

== History ==
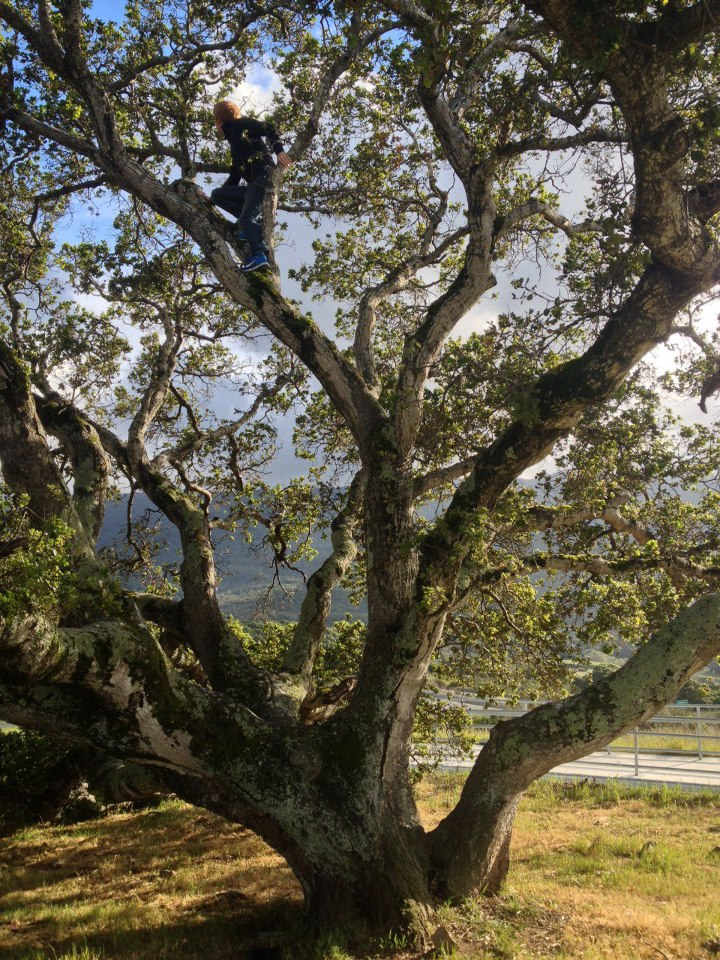
A child climbs a tree.

Professional arborists have been climbing trees since the late 19th century in the UK and North America. Climbing a tree every day for a year or longer has become a challenge taken up by several artists; Todd Smith from Louisville, KY, USA, climbed a tree every day for 3 years. Henrik G Dahle invited people to climb with him and interviewed people in the canopy of trees, including former competitive tree climber Leo Murray of Monkeydo, who now runs tree top adventures. Other artists include Christopher B Gray from Connecticut, USA, Kamila Wajda from Przybowka, Poland and Cecylia Malik from Kraków, Poland who has published a book about her year climbing trees.

== Techniques ==
Many different techniques (free climbing, self-belayed climbing with a doubled-rope technique, single-rope technique, and lead climbing) are used to climb trees depending on the climber's purpose for the climb and personal preference. Free climbing is performed without protective gear, and as such is the oldest method of climbing.

Technologically aided tree climbing is performed by lapping a long rope over a limb and ascending the fallen end using a friction knot tied from initial tie's excess tail. There are a large number of factors that can affect the difficulty of a climb; the regularity of branching, the brittleness of dead wood, the texture of the bark, the width of the trunk and branches, the height and location of the tree, and the weather can all contribute to challenges faced while climbing.

Getting to the first branch of a tree is typically the most difficult part of the climb due to the potentially large distance between the first limb and the ground. Both aid climbing and free climbing can be used, but the throwline technique is most typical among hobbyists. This is done remotely from the ground utilizing a throw weight and line. The weight is swung from its attached line as a pendulum, with the line either held between two fingers of one hand at hip level, or in a basket configuration achieved by running a bight of the line back through the ring that is held in the other hand, with the weight being swung between the legs in a wide stance. It is then launched toward the targeted branch. Once over the branch, the weight must return to the ground, and may have to be manipulated so as to isolate a single anchor point (doubled rope technique), or for SRT into an optimal redirect. The throw bag is then removed; the climbing line is tied on, and pulled through the canopy and back down again, at which point the climbing system may be installed.

=== Doubled-rope technique ===
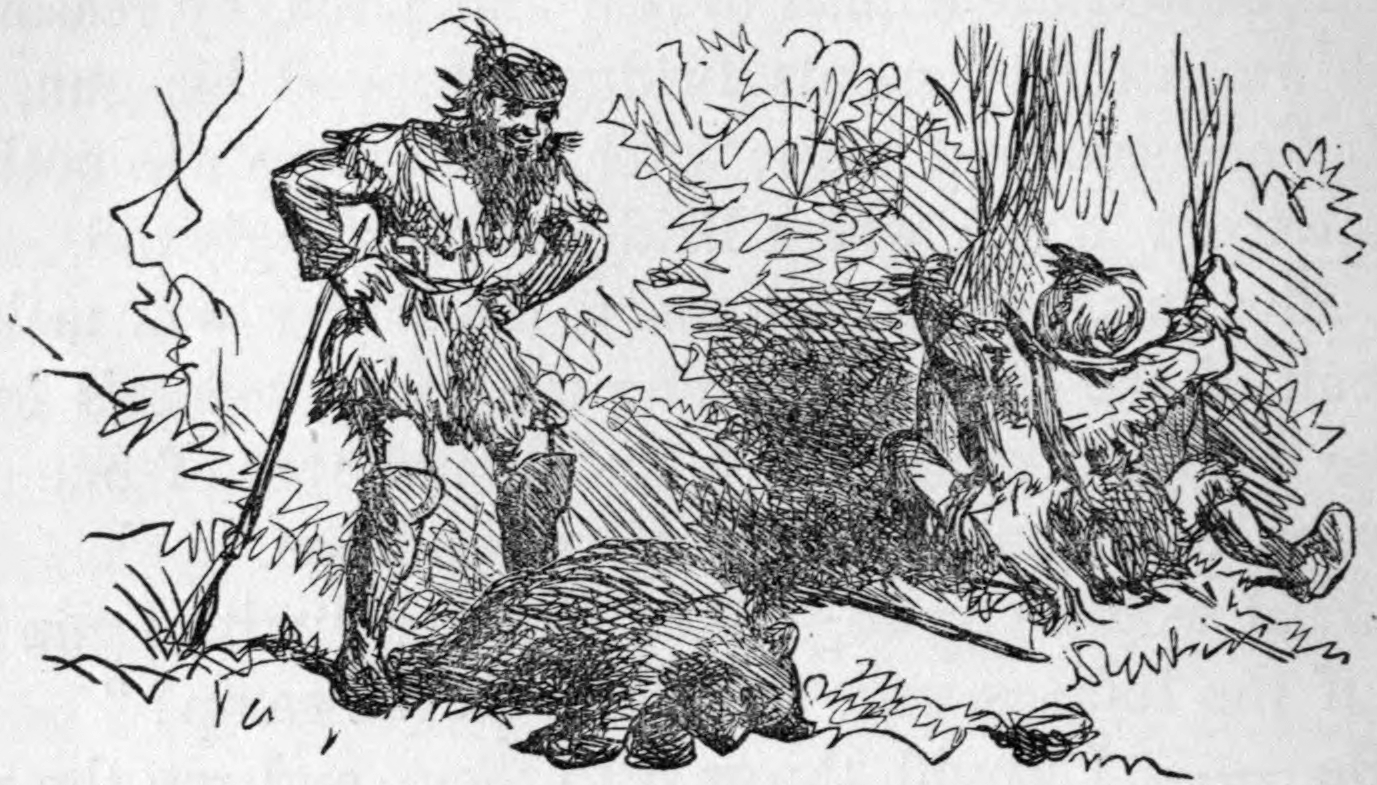
Depiction of a failed attempt at tree climbing, from an anecdote in Frances Fuller Victor's 1887 book Eleven years in the Rocky Mountains and a life on the frontier (Ch. V.)

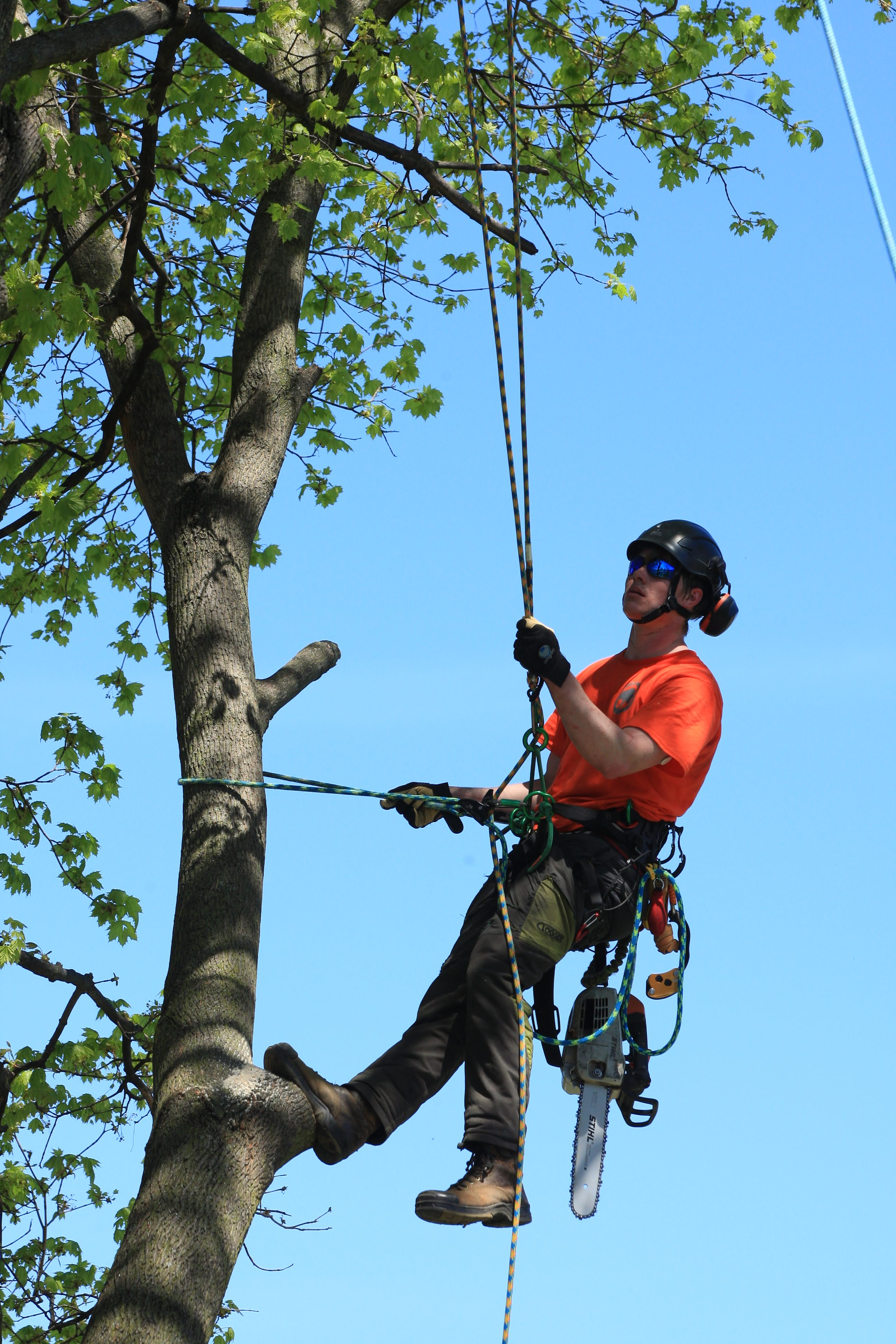
Arborist climbing a Norway Maple in Ontario, Canada

The doubled-rope technique (DRT or DdRT) is used to self belay the climber in such a way that the rope can be retrieved without going back up the tree. One end of the rope is fastened to the climber's saddle (harness), from there the rope passes around the tree and back to a friction hitch, which is also attached to the climber. This system allows the climber to easily adjust the rope to provide a belay if free-climbing, or to go up or down if hanging on the rope. As long as the climber is below the anchor and there is minimal slack in the system, any fall will be restrained. This system can be placed into the tree from the ground, or the climber can advance the rope up the tree over the course of the climb.

=== Single-rope technique ===
The single-rope technique (SRT) is used mainly for getting to the top of large trees that cannot be easily free-climbed. With the adequate hardware, a throw line, an attached weight, and a launching system (e.g., a bow or slingshot), a climbing rope can be anchored to a branch very high in the tree. This is done by launching the weight (with the throw line attached) over the desired limb and tying the climbing rope to the unweighted end. The climbing rope is then hauled over the branch by pulling on the throw line. The line is anchored to the trunk or to the high limb itself by running one end through a closed bight made in the other end. The climber then ascends the rope (using a set of friction hitches or mechanical ascenders) to obtain the desired limb. With practice, this method is typically fastest and requires the least amount of hardware. One drawback is that it does not necessarily involve directly ascending the tree itself, as the vast majority of the time spent climbing is ascending the rope, and not the tree itself. Additionally, it can provide greater safety to a climber over DRT or lead climbing techniques, as the climber can rig the rope over multiple limbs when using a ground-level trunk anchor. If one limb breaks, then lower limbs may stop the fall.

=== Lead climbing ===
Lead climbing is employed by climber where points of protection are formed by girthing the tree's limbs with slings. Once the lead climber ascends the tree, they may create a belay or top rope anchor or else simply rappel down. If an anchor is created, then other climbers can subsequently climb the tree on belay without having to lead. Drawbacks to this method include the probability of hitting a lower limb or the main trunk in the event of a fall.

== See also ==
- Climbing
- Caving
- Tree house
- Tree sitting
- Aerial Adventure Park
