= Distel hitch =

Friction hitch knot

Distel Hitch
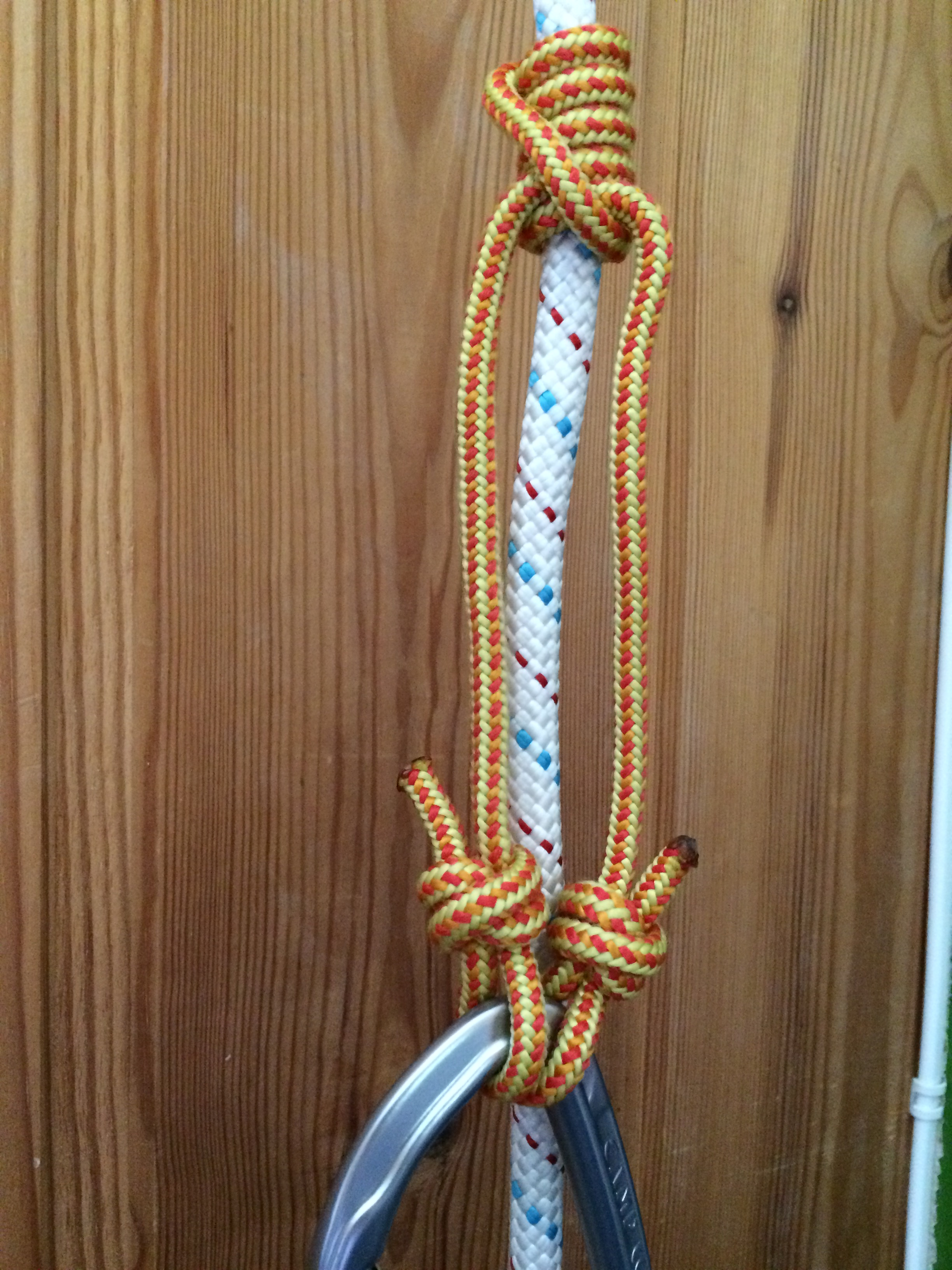
- Category: Hitch
- Related: Taut-line hitch, Blake's hitch, Clove hitch
- Typical use: Ascending, Descending
- ABoK: #1734, #1465, #452, #503, #1230, #1681

Distel hitch is a friction hitch knot used to attach a carabiner to a rope, allowing a climber to descend or ascend. The knot is similar to the prusik knot, however it grips the rope more consistently, making for increased climber control. The distel hitch's similarity to a clove hitch with multiple descending wraps also aids in memorisation when climbing.

== See also ==
- List of friction hitch knots
