= Abseiling =

Rope-controlled descent

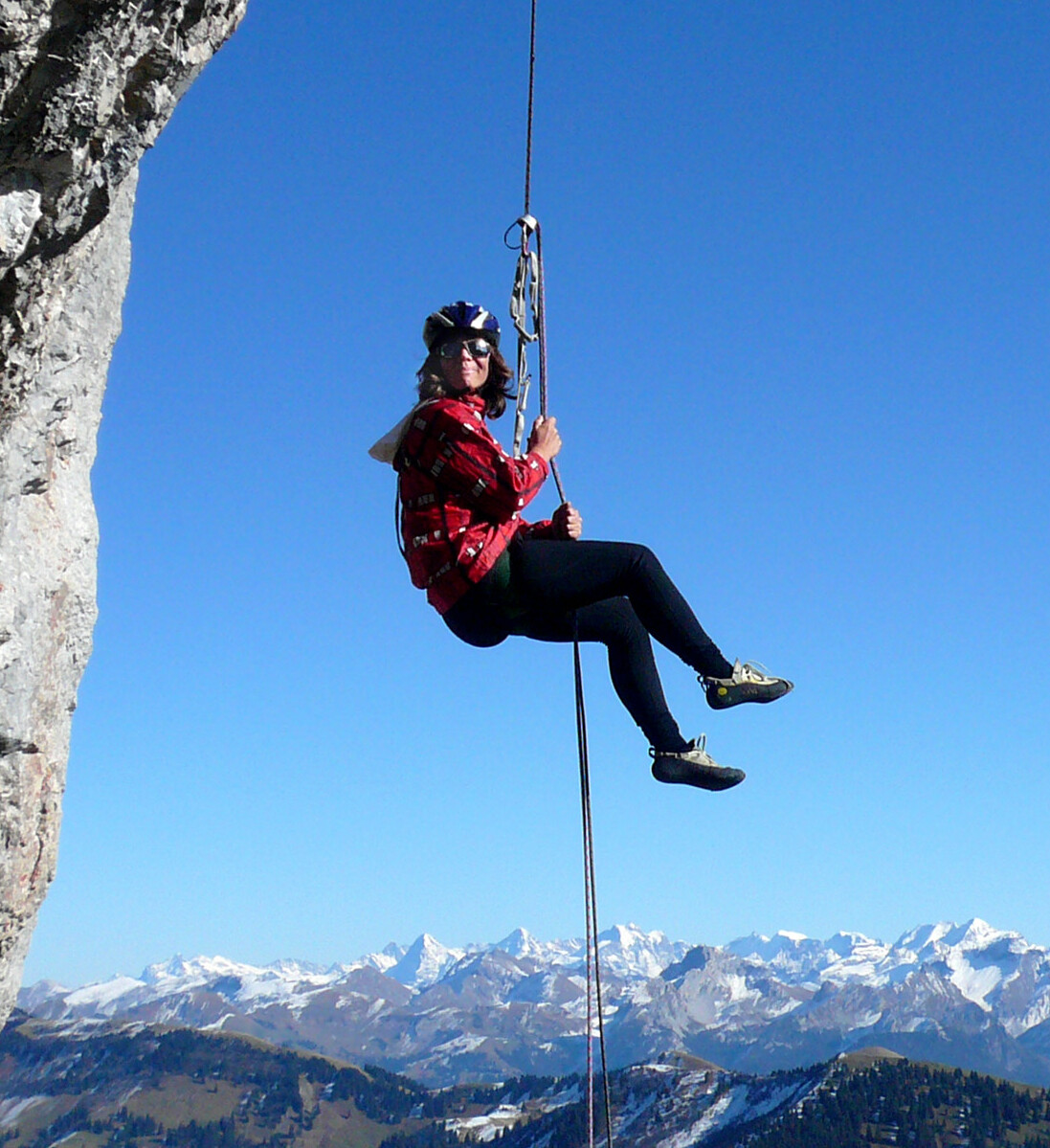
Abseiling using extended belay device (without the use of auto block backup)

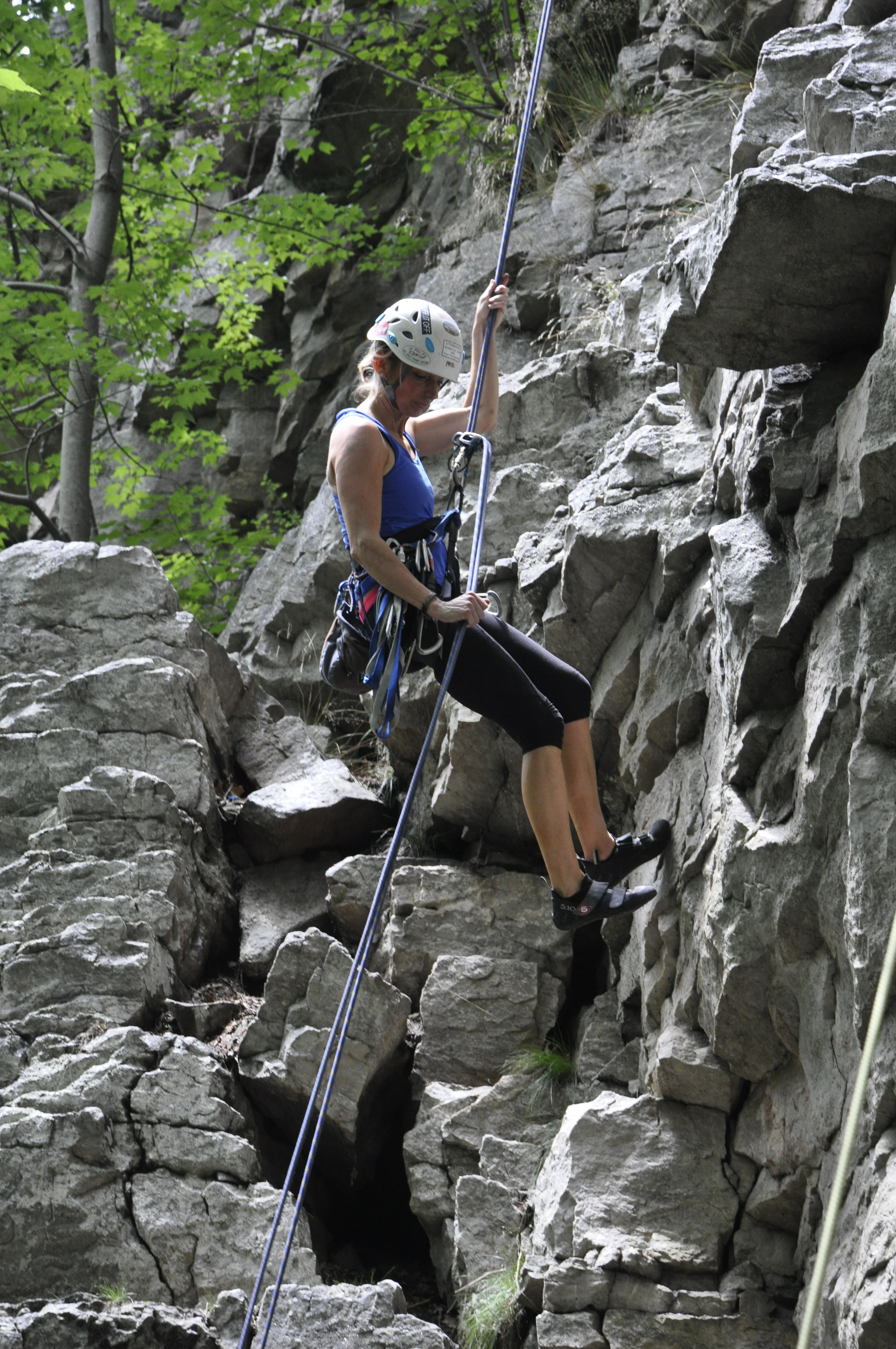
Basic rappelling setup using belay device clipped directly to the harness. This technique is no longer considered to follow the best practices

Abseiling (/ˈæbseɪl/ AB-sayl or /ˈɑːpzaɪl/ AHP-zyle; from German abseilen 'to rope down'), also known as rappelling (/ˈræpɛl/ RAP-pell or /rəˈpɛl/ rə-PELL; from French rappeler 'to recall, to pull through'), is the controlled descent of a steep slope, such as a rock face, by moving down a rope. When abseiling, the person descending controls their own movement down a static or fixed rope, in contrast to lowering off, in which the rope attached to the person descending is payed out by their belayer.

== Description ==
Abseiling from a building in Japan

The technique is used by climbers, mountaineers, cavers, canyoners, search and rescue and rope access technicians to descend cliffs or slopes when they are too steep or dangerous to descend without protection. Many climbers use this technique to protect established anchors from damage. Rope access technicians also use this as a method to access difficult-to-reach areas from above for various industrial applications like maintenance, construction, inspection and welding.

To descend safely, abseilers use a variety of techniques to increase the friction on the rope to the point where it can be controlled comfortably. These techniques range from wrapping the rope around their body (e.g. the Dülfersitz technique) to using custom-built devices like a rack or a figure of 8. Practitioners choose a technique based on speed, safety, weight and other circumstantial concerns.

In the United States, the term "rappelling" is used. In the United Kingdom, both terms are understood, but "abseiling" is more common. In Australia, New Zealand and Canada, the two terms are used interchangeably. Globally, the term "rappelling" appears in books written in English more often than "abseiling".

== Best practices ==
Best practice technique change with time and might differ for different activities. In the 2020s, the technique generally agreed as the best practice in climbing involves using a extended rappelling device with a friction hitch knot backup below it. The friction hitch knot, also known as "third hand", is typically the autoblock knot but other knots like prusik can be used as well.

== History ==
Abseiling has existed, both using body abseil and descenders for centuries, with body abseiling being mentioned in the late 1400s, and descenders being described in the early 1500s.

The origin of the term rappel in reference to the technique is attributed by Mountaineering author Roger Frison-Roche circa 1944. Frison-Roche in turn attributed the technique of rappelling to Jean Charlet-Straton, a Chamonix guide who lived from 1840 to 1925. However, at the time, the term rappel meant to use a doubled rope that could be pulled down afterwards, and did not necessarily refer to abseiling, and while Frison-Roche may have used a doubled rope technique, he did not use an abseiling technique devised by Charlet-Straton. Different approaches for using a doubled rope had already been described in the late 1700s and by Edward Whymper around 1860, though neither case were used with what would be considered abseiling. Charlet-Straton then used another doubled rope technique which was called the rappel during a failed solo attempt of Petit Dru in 1876. The technique he used to descend the rope would not normally be considered abseiling, and had already been described numerous times long before he used it, with most authors saying it risked injuries. After many attempts, some of them solo, he managed to reach the summit of the Petit Dru in 1879 in the company of two other hired Chamonix guides, Prosper Payot and Frédéric Folliguet. During that ascent, Charlet-Straton again used the technique, with his companions assisting.

== Equipment ==
- Ropes: Static rope is ideal, but often dynamic rope is used.
- Anchors: Usually constructed from trees, boulders, ice or rock features, using webbing/cordelette, or rock climbing equipment. Some areas have fixed anchors such as bolts or pitons.
- Descender: A friction device or friction hitch that allows the rope to be played out in a controlled fashion, under load, with minimal effort by the person controlling it.
- Climbing harness: Fixed around the waist or whole body used to secure the descender. Fit is important to prevent suspension trauma.
- Safety back-up: Typically a friction hitch such as a Prusik, Klemheist knot, or autoblock knot wrapped around the rope as to prevent uncontrolled descents.
- Helmets: Used to protect the head from bumps and falling rocks.
- Gloves: Used to protect hands from the rope and from colliding with the wall. May increase the risk of an accident by becoming caught in the descender.
- Boots or climbing shoes: Used to increase friction against the rock
- Knee pads (and sometimes elbow-pads)

== Application ==
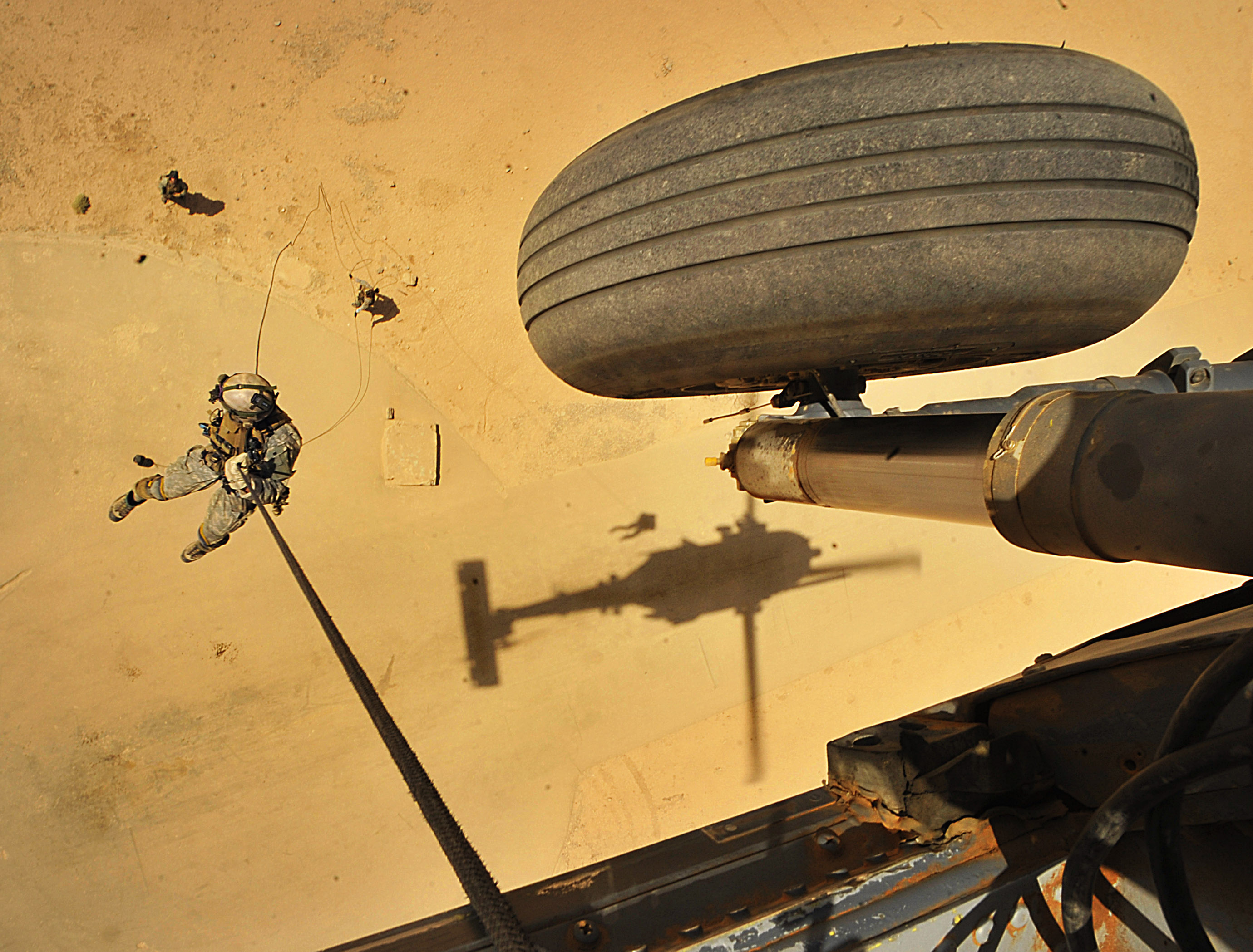
A United States Air Force Pararescueman rappels from a helicopter during a training exercise in Iraq, 2008

Abseiling is used in a number of applications, including:

- Climbing – for returning to the base of a climb or to a point where one can try a new route.
- Recreation
- Canyoning – to descend tall waterfalls or cliffs.
- Mountaineering
- Caving – to descend vertical drops in a cave.
- Adventure racing
- Industrial/commercial applications – to access parts of structures or buildings so as to perform maintenance, cleaning or construction, known as rope access.
- Access to wildfires.
- Confined spaces access – e.g. ballast tanks, manholes
- Rescue applications – used to access injured people on or nearby cliffs.
- Military applications – tactical heliborne insertion of troops, including special forces, into the battlefield close to the objective when proper landing zones are not available.

== Styles/techniques ==
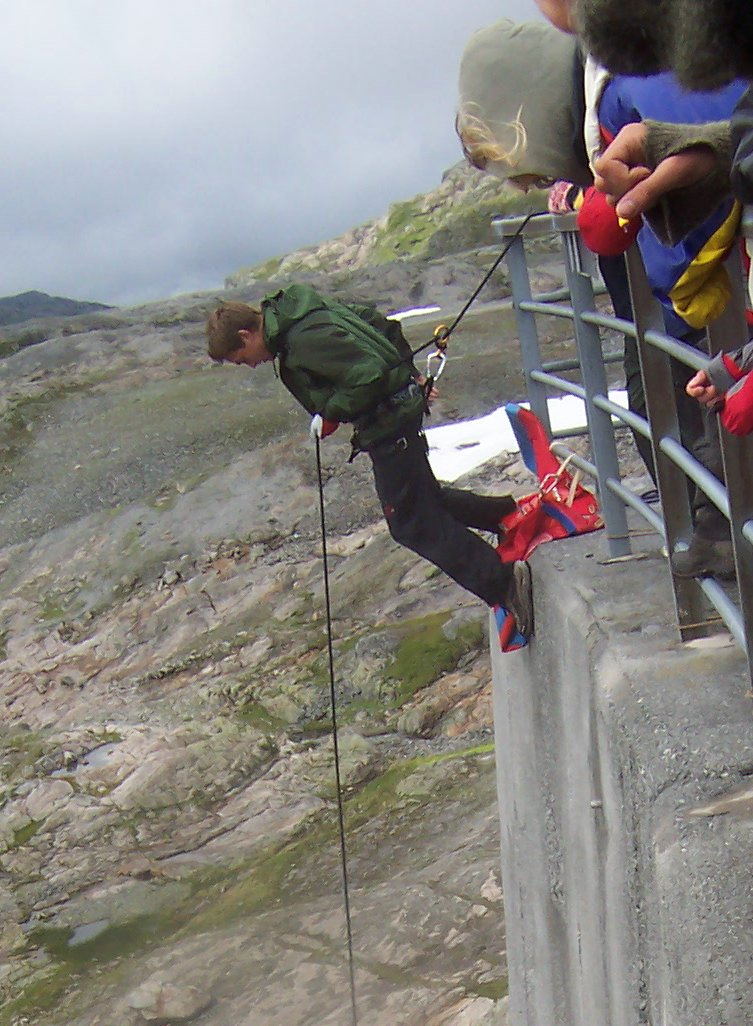
Australian rappel demonstrated at a dam in Norway

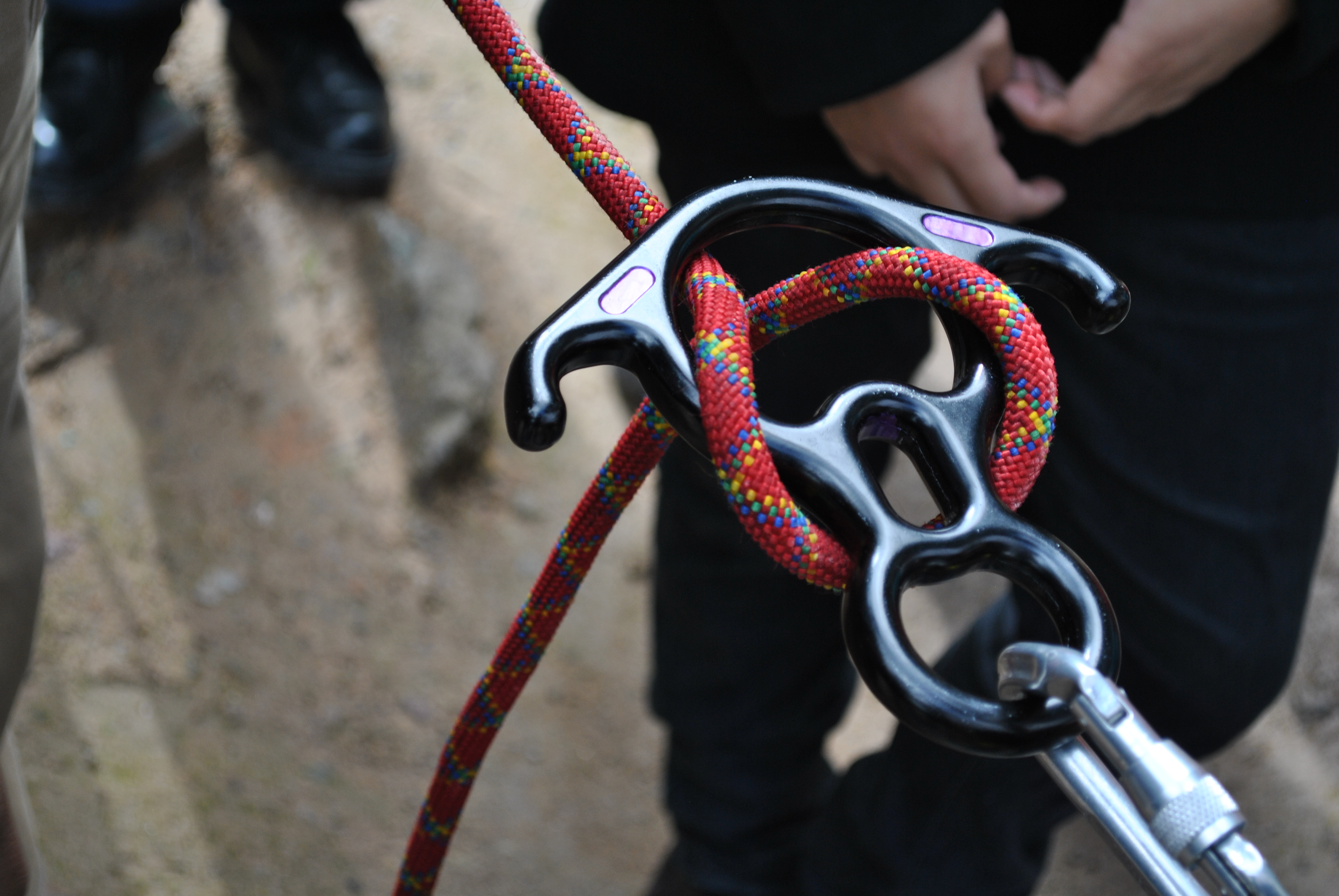
Rescue-style (eared) figure eight descender and rope

- Australian rappel — Used in the military. The abseiler descends facing downwards allowing them to see where they are going.
- Tandem or spider abseiling — Used in climbing. Involves two climbers descending on the same belay device. This is useful in rescue situations when one of the climbers is incapacitated or the descent needs to be done quickly. The set-up is similar to a regular rappelling, with the incapacitated climber suspended from the descender (and backed up on the primary climbers harness).
- Simul-rappelling or simultaneously rappelling — Used in climbing and canyoning. Two climbers descend simultaneously on the same length of rope, where one climber's weight counterbalances the other. Generally the technique is considered less safe than the regular rappelling; however, it is useful in case of emergencies, or for rapping off opposite sides of a fin or spire where there are no anchor points. This is common in places like the Needles of South Dakota’s Black Hills.
- Counterbalance abseiling — Used in climbing. This rescue technique is typically used by a leader to reach an injured second. The leader abseils off on one strand of rope, using the incapacitated second's weight on the other strand of the rope as a counterbalance.
- Releasable abseil — Used by guides. This safety technique allows a leader to descend with inexperienced abseilers. A rope about twice the length of the descent is anchored with a munter mule hitch. The client descends on a single isolated strand of the rope. If the client becomes stuck halfway down the guide will be able to unlock the other strand and lower the client to the ground using the hitch as a belay device. This could be useful if the client panics, or gets clothing or hair entangled in the descender.
- Classical (non-mechanical methods), e.g. the Dülfersitz — Used in emergencies. These technique are more dangerous than modern alternatives and only used when no other option is available. They involve descending without aid of mechanical devices, by wrapping the rope around the body, and were used before the advent of harnesses and hardware.
- South African classical abseil (double-roped) — Used in emergencies. This is a type of classical abseil where the user has a spare hand.
- Fireman's Belay — Safety backup. A partner stands on the ground below holding the rope(s). If the abseiler begins to fall they will be able to pull down on the rope to arrest the descent.

== Safety ==
Abseiling can be dangerous and presents risks, especially to unsupervised or inexperienced abseilers. According to German mountaineer Pit Schubert, about 25% of climbing deaths occur during abseiling, most commonly due to failing anchors. An analysis of American Alpine Club accident reports shows that this is followed by inadequate safety backups and rappelling off the ends of ropes.

== Environmental concerns ==
Recreational abseiling is prohibited or discouraged in some areas, as it may cause environmental damage, conflict with climbers heading upwards, and endanger people on the ground.

== See also ==
- Canyoning
- Caving
- Mountaineering
- Search and rescue
- Fast-roping
