= Knute hitch =

Type of knot

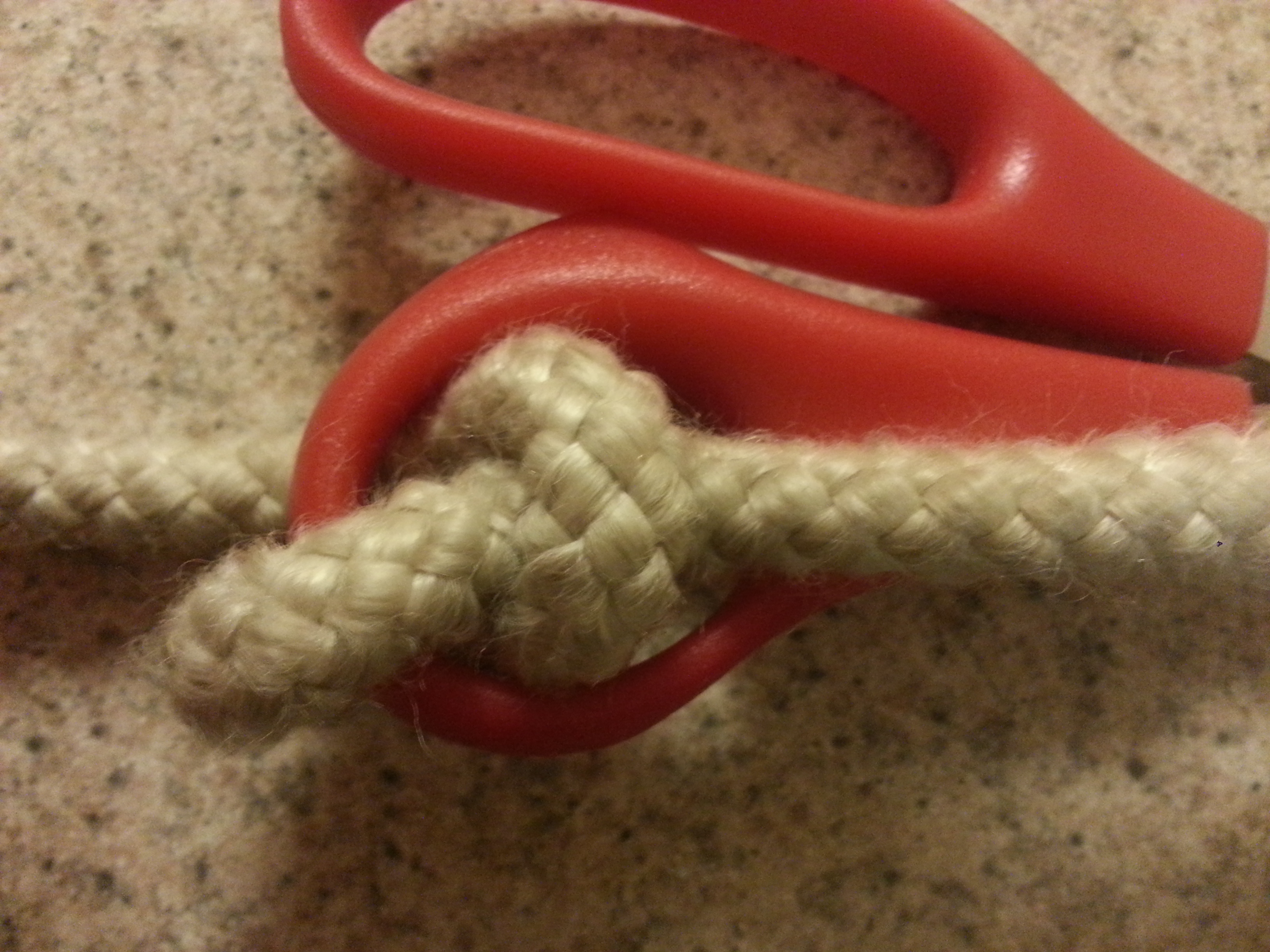
- Category: Hitch
- Related: Marlinespike hitch
- Releasing: Non-jamming
- Typical use: Attaching a lanyard to a tool

The Knute hitch is used to attach a lanyard of small stuff to a marlingspike or other tool. Rigger Brion Toss named the hitch after his favourite marlingspike of the same name, although the hitch is likely much older.

== Tying ==
The lanyard line should be just small enough to fit doubled through the lanyard hole in the tool. This is done, forming a protruding bight. The end, with a figure-eight knot stopper, is placed through the bight but not fully pulled through. Finally, the bight is withdrawn, jamming the bight and line end in the hole. To release, pull on the end and remove it from the bight.

== See also ==
- List of friction hitch knots
