= South African abseil =

Abseiling technique

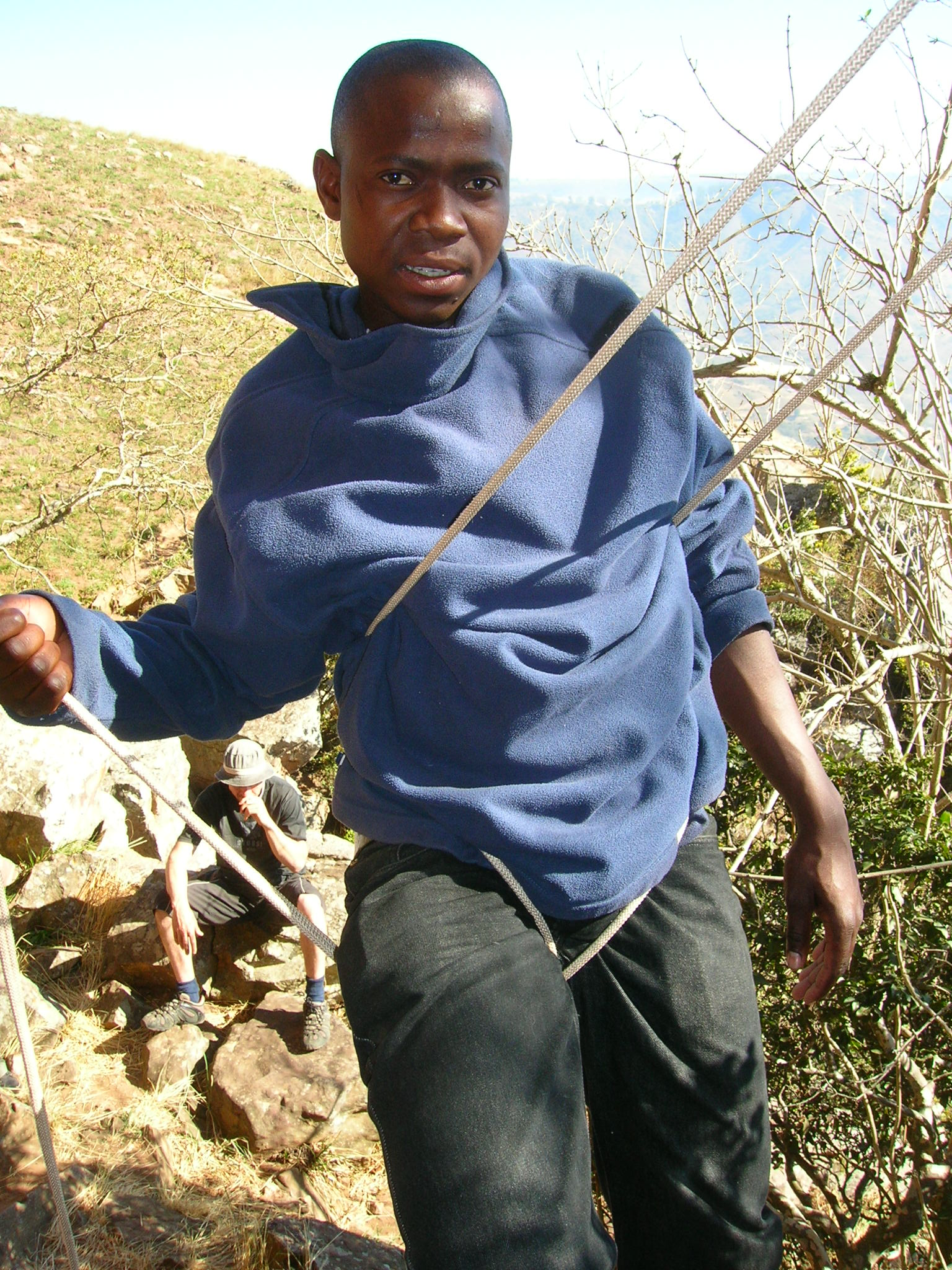
Method of wrapping the rope for the South African Abseil

The South African Abseil or South African Double Roped Classical Abseil is a modern variation of the non-mechanical classical abseil method used by mountaineers and rock climbers to quickly descend steep terrain by sliding down a rope wrapped around their body to create controlled friction.

== History ==
This method of classical (non-mechanical) abseiling was developed by South African mountaineering instructor/guide, Andrew Friedemann in 2000 whilst facilitating a Mountain Leader course in Mooi River - South Africa. The classical abseil taught on the course was deemed to be too onerous and an alternate was investigated with a group of students which would remove the issues of rope burn, lack of sufficient control and toppling over backwards which is a common problem with the standard classical abseil. Later on that same year, the method was demonstrated to the UIAA International Training Standards Working group seminar in Chamonix - France, and was dubbed the South African Abseil by those representatives present as none of the countries taking part had seen the method before.

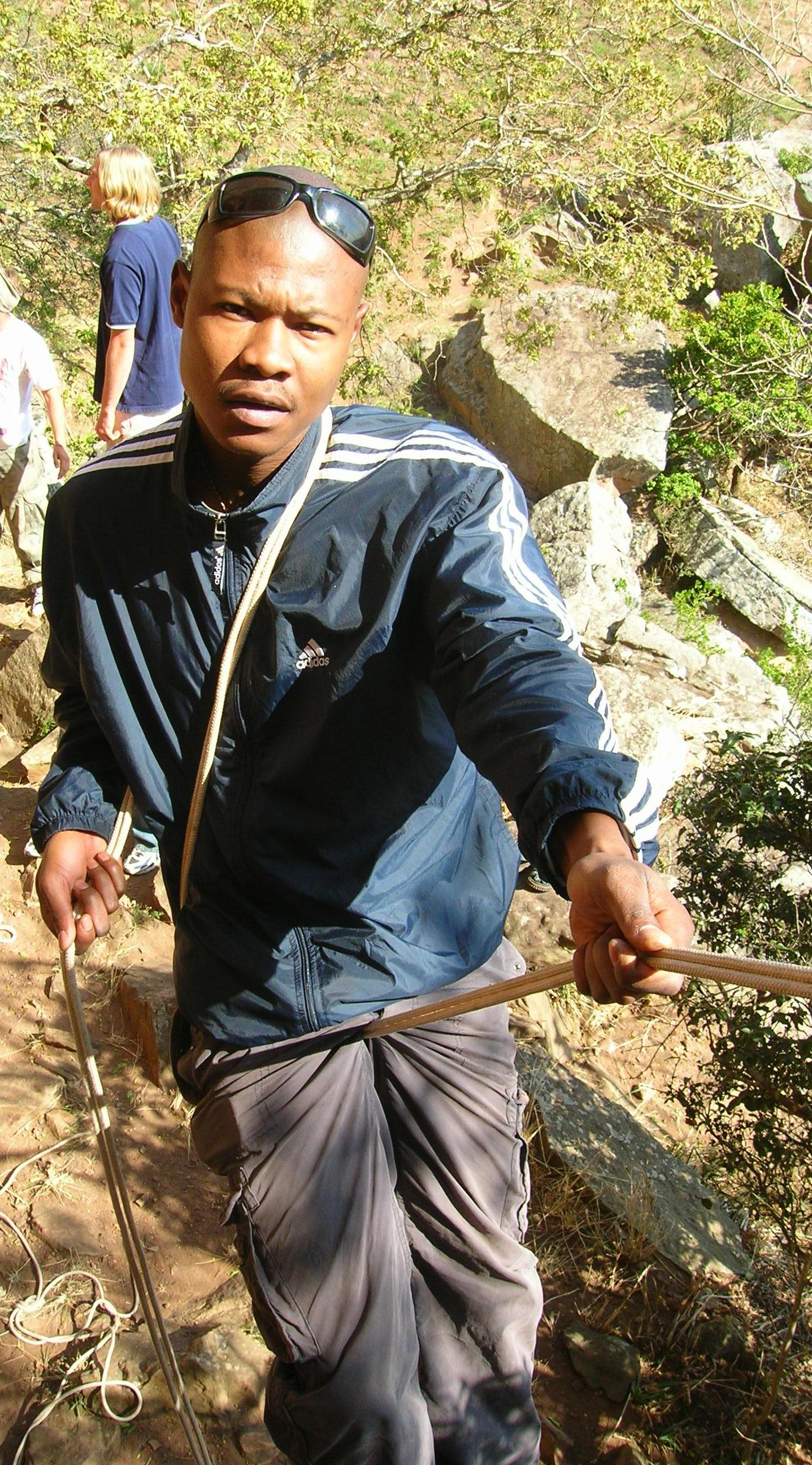
Method of wrapping the rope for the Classical Abseil

== Application ==
All forms of classical abseiling are generally for emergency use only. Modern abseil equipment and techniques have largely made the classical abseil obsolete, however where the right mechanical equipment is not available and a descent of steep terrain by rope is necessary, such as in an emergency situation, the classical methods are still used with caution. Walking parties are generally now the most common users of classical abseils when negotiating steep terrain, as they do not normally carry mechanical devices but often do carry rope.

Classical abseils work by wrapping a rope around the body to create friction allowing the abseiler to descend in a controlled manner. Once the abseiler reaches the ground, the doubled rope is retrieved by pulling down on one side allowing the rope to slip around the anchor.

=== Advantages of the South Africa Abseil ===
- Friction is generated over a larger surface area so it is less painful and has more control.
- The ropes run around and cross over the back just below the armpits so supporting the abseiler upright and there is less tendency to topple over backwards.
- One hand can be left completely free unlike the classical abseil where both hands must be used to prevent toppling backwards.
