= Autoblock =

Rope device used in climbing and caving

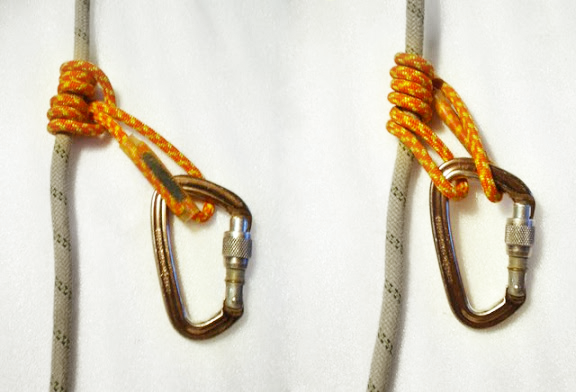
An autoblock using a Prusik knot on the left and an autoblock using the Machard knot ("autoblock knot") on the right.

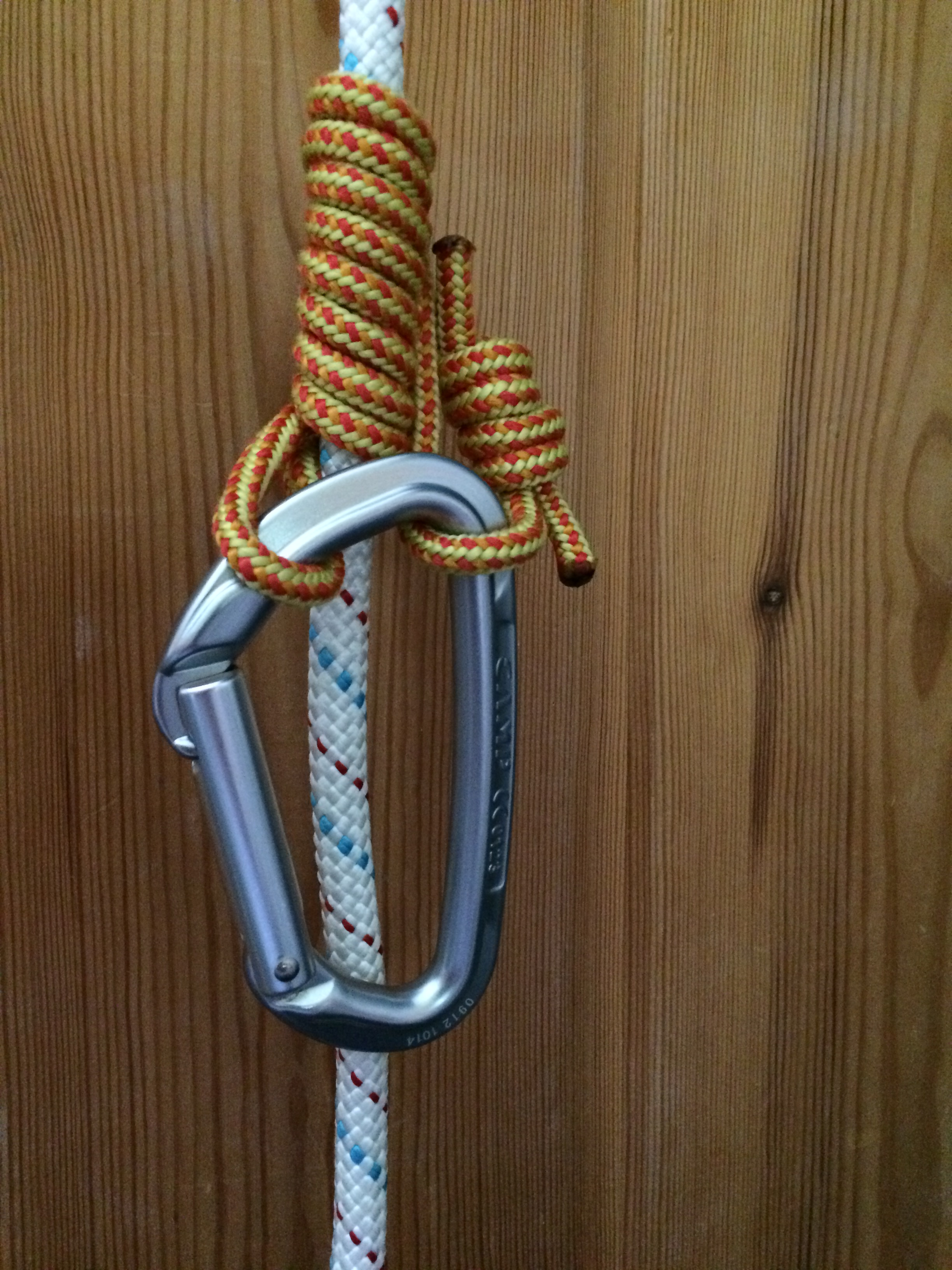

An autoblock (or autobloc or "third hand") is a rope device used in climbing and caving for both rappelling (downward) and ascending (upward).

While rappelling, it slides freely down the rope when pushed downward by the hand, allowing a controlled descent, but jams in the event of a sudden drop or loss of control, stopping the descent. This prevents uncontrolled falls in the event of an accident in which the rappeler loses control of the rope. For ascending, it likewise can be pushed up the rope manually when unweighted, but jams and holds when weighted by the body.

It is made using a friction hitch around the rope, connected by a carabiner to the climber's harness, and may be combined with other climbing equipment for further safety. For instance, it is typically used as a backup while rappelling using a tube belay device.

The term autoblock is also used for a specific type of friction hitch, which is also known as a French prusik or Machard knot, named after its inventor, Serge Machard.

Other friction hitches that can be used to build an autoblock system include the Prusik knot, Klemheist knot, and Bachmann knot.

The Ashley Book of Knots #505.

== See also ==
- List of knots
