= Blake's hitch =

Type of knot

Blake's Hitch
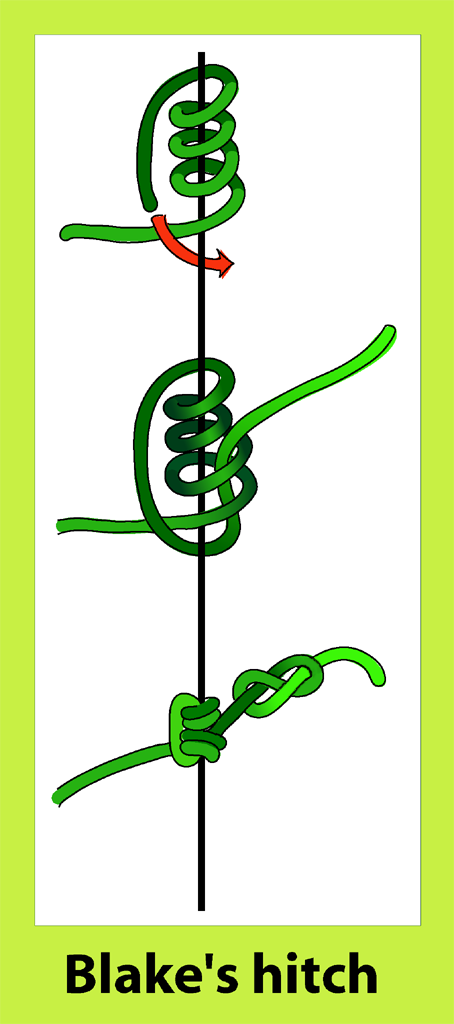
- Category: Hitch
- Origin: Heinz Prohaska
- Related: Prusik knot, Sailor's hitch, Bachmann knot, Klemheist knot
- Releasing: Not Jamming
- Typical use: Climbing
- ABoK: NA

The Blake's hitch is a friction hitch commonly used by arborists and tree climbers as an ascending knot. Unlike other common climbing hitches, which often use a loop of cord, the Blake's hitch is formed using the end of a rope. Although it is a stable knot, it is often backed up with a stopper knot, such as a figure-of-eight knot, for safety. It is used for both ascending and descending, and is preferred by many arborists over other hitches, such as the taut-line hitch, as it is less prone to binding.

== History ==
The first known presentation of this knot was made by Heinz Prohaska in an Austrian guides periodical in 1981; in 1990, he presented it in a caving journal, Nylon Highway. Separately, Jason Blake discovered the knot for himself and presented it to the arborist community in a letter to Arbor Age in 1994, after which it was enthusiastically adopted by arborists. It has since become well known under the name "Blake's hitch."

== Usage ==
This hitch has two conventional forms – the 4/2 and the 5/3 – although other variations are possible.

The 4/2 version has four total turns, with the tail passing up through the bottom two.

The 5/3 version has five total turns, with the tail passing up through the bottom three.

The hitch is dressed and set tight enough to provide enough grip for the applied load without being tighter than necessary.

This hitch is most commonly used with 12-13mm (1/2 inch) static climbing ropes.

To prevent failure in slippery rope Heinz advises adding a round turn to the 4/2 knot, creating a 5/2.

To prevent failure due to rope stiffness, both add a round turn and tuck the tail one full turn higher, resulting in the 5/3.

== Tying ==
After passing the tail round the standing end, the tail then must pass back behind the standing line and up through the desired number of turns of the coil.

In practice it helps to insert the thumb under the lower turns to facilitate threading the tail.

A stopper knot is added to the tail after tying to prevent failure.

Incorrect tying - by not passing the tail behind the standing line after looping - can lead to failure.

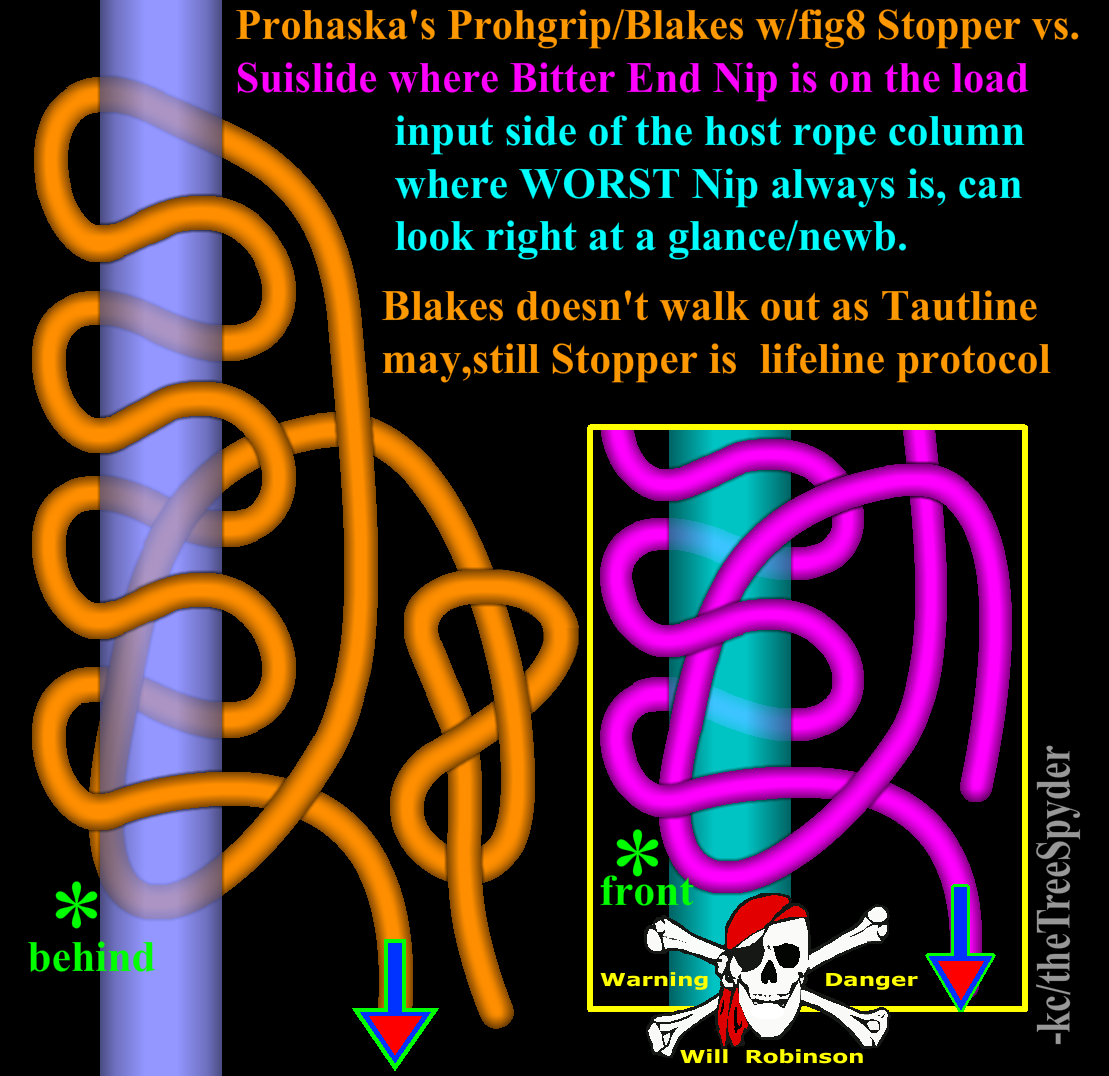

== See also ==
- List of knots
- List of friction hitch knots
