= Bachmann knot =

Type of knot

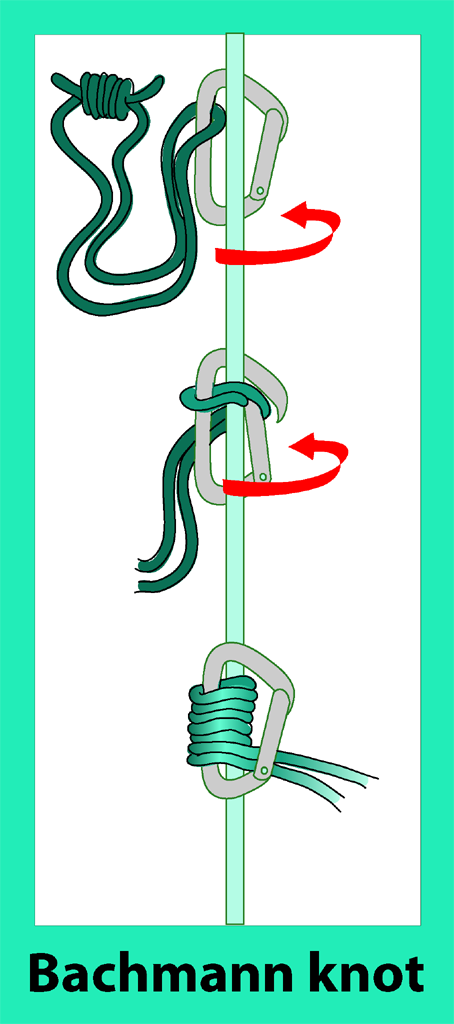
- Names: Bachmann knot, Bachman knot
- Category: Hitch
- Related: Prusik knot, Klemheist knot, Blake's hitch
- Typical use: Mountaineering

The Bachmann hitch (sometimes misspelled 'Bachman') is a friction hitch, named after the Austrian alpinist Franz Bachmann. It is useful when the friction hitch needs to be reset quickly or often or made to be self-tending as in crevasse and self-rescue. (See Prusik knot)

The Bachmann hitch requires the use of a carabiner. It does not matter if the carabiner is locking or not. Most importantly, the carabiner must be of round cross section for friction. Grabbing hold of the carabiner will release the friction and allow the hitch to slide freely and thus be moved appropriately. To remove the Bachmann hitch, just unclip the top loop, hold on to the carabiner and pull the cord free.

This knot is frequently tied using a sling made from 1" tubular webbing. In this case wrap the webbing 3 times around the rope (this means the carabiner gate must be opened 3 times in the tying of the knot) for normal (dry) applications. There are a limited number of applications that involve repeated shock loads to the knot and in these 4 wraps are usually sufficient.

However, with a non-locking carabiner it is safer to use the knot with the carabiner gate opening facing down (opposite to what is shown in the picture). This decreases the risk of self-unclipping: at maximum, one twist goes off. Otherwise, the whole knot may fail.

It is important for safety reasons to mention that the rope used for the friction hitch should be smaller in diameter than the tension rope. This allows for movement when resetting the hitch position but when a large load is applied to the friction hitch, the hitch locks on to the tension rope. If two ropes of the same diameter are used for the friction hitch and tension rope, the hitch may move freely like a slip knot (lasso or noose) and not lock into place. When encircling any cylindrical object, most ropes can only be tightened to a diameter slightly greater than the ropes own diameter(USMC Assault Climber Course).

== See also ==
- List of knots
- List of friction hitch knots
