= List of friction hitch knots =

A friction hitch is a kind of knot used to attach one rope to another in a way that is easily adjusted. These knots are commonly used in climbing as part of single-rope technique, doubled-rope technique and as "ratchets" to capture progress on a moving rope, most typically in a mechanical advantage system such as a Z-drag. These hitches are a simple and cheap alternative to mechanical ascenders.

== List of friction hitches ==
Knot	Description	Image
Adjustable grip hitch	A simple and useful friction hitch, which may easily be shifted up and down the rope while slack.	
Autoblock (Machard or French Prusik)	A friction hitch tied around a thicker rope that can slide while unloaded, but locks when loaded. Commonly used to back up belays. Similar to the Prusik only in function. French Prusik is equivalent to bi-directional Machard.	
Bachmann hitch		
Blake's hitch	A friction hitch commonly used by arborists and tree climbers as an ascending knot. Blake's hitch is known by some climbers as a Swicero (Suicero) knot or Verones knot.	
Distel Hitch		
Ezelius' adjustable grip hitch	A slip and grip knot that gives good grip and has a wide range of use. Functions well on a wide range of rope materials, including slippery types like polyamide (nylon) and high-modulus polyethylene (Dynema™). Attaching cord can be of same or smaller diameter. Grip in one direction.	
Farrimond friction hitch	A quick-release adjustable friction hitch for use on lines under tension.	
Gripping sailor's hitch	A secure, jam-proof hitch used to tie one rope to another, or a rope to a pole, boom, spar, etc., when the pull is lengthwise along the object. It is also known as Michoacan/Martin among friction knots used in climbing.	
Hedden Hitch (Kreuzklem/Hedden Knot)	The reverse variant of the Klemheist knot, it's often described as an "upside-down" Klemheist, where the load-bearing bight wraps from the top of the coils rather than the bottom. This reliable hitch is considered more dependable than the Klemheist, generally requiring one less spiral wrap to hold fast.	
Icicle hitch	A knot that is excellent for connecting to a post when weight is applied to an end running parallel to the post in a specific direction.	
Klemheist hitch	A friction hitch tied around a thicker rope that can slide while unloaded, but locks when loaded. Similar to the Prusik. Klemheist knot is a full equivalent to uni-directional Machard.	
Knut hitch	A friction hitch used for climbing a rope, not to be confused with the Knute hitch.	
Machard Tresse	A mono-directional variant of the common Machard. Tresse, French for braided, indicates a final crossing turn, which increases the hitch's hold and ease of release.	
Michoacan/Martin	A friction hitch tied around a thicker rope that can slide while unloaded, but locks when loaded. Similar to the Prusik. Michoacan/Martin is a full equivalent to Gripping sailor's hitch	
Pile hitch	The pile hitch is easier to tie than the icicle hitch, and can be tied in the bight without access to either end of the rope.	
Prusik or Prussik	A friction hitch or knot used to put a loop of cord around a rope, applied in climbing, canyoneering, mountaineering, caving, rope rescue, and by arborists.	
Rolling hitch (Taut-line hitch)		
Schwabisch hitch	A friction hitch tied around a thicker rope that can slide while unloaded, but locks when loaded. Similar to the Prusik	
Todd-Kramer hitch	A friction hitch tied around a thicker rope that can slide while unloaded, but locks when loaded. Similar to the Prusik	
Valdotain Tresse	Friction knot used to be fixed on a tautline (a taut-rope), also known as a "Valdostano". It is the single cord equivalent of the Machard Tresse (which uses a loop of cord)	
Cooper's hitch	Friction knot used primarily instead of the Valdotain Tresse to which it is similar in design and function.	

== See also ==
- List of hitch knots
- List of knots
