= Prusik =

Type of knot

Prusik hitch
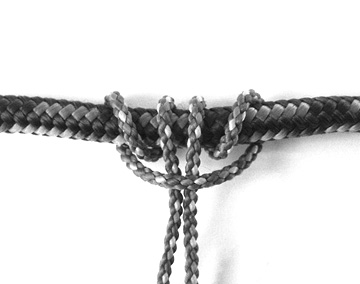
- Names: Prusik hitch, Prusik knot, Prunion
- Category: Hitch
- Origin: Karl Prusik, 1931
- Related: Bachmann knot, Blake's hitch, Klemheist knot, Cow hitch
- Releasing: Non-jamming
- Typical use: Climbing
- ABoK: #1763

A Prusik (/ˈprʌsɪk/ PRUSS-ik) is a friction hitch or knot used to attach a loop of cord around a rope, applied in climbing, canyoneering, mountaineering, caving, rope rescue, ziplining, and by arborists. The term Prusik is a name for both the loops of cord used to tie the hitch and the hitch itself, and the verb is "to prusik" or "prusiking" (i.e. using a Prusik to ascend). More casually, the term is used for any friction hitch or device that can grab a rope (see autoblock). Due to the pronunciation, the word is often misspelled Prussik, Prussick, or Prussic.

The Prusik hitch is named after its putative inventor, the Austrian mountaineer Karl Prusik. It was shown in a 1931 Austrian mountaineering manual for rope ascending. It was used on several mountaineering routes of the era to ascend the final summit, where a rope could be thrown over the top and anchored so that climbers could attain the summit by prusiking up the other side of the rope.

A Prusik made from cord does little or no damage to the rope it is attached to, whereas some mechanical ascenders (not Prusiks) can cause damage from normal use, and especially if the device slips during climbing or is heavily loaded or shock-loaded.

== Advantages ==
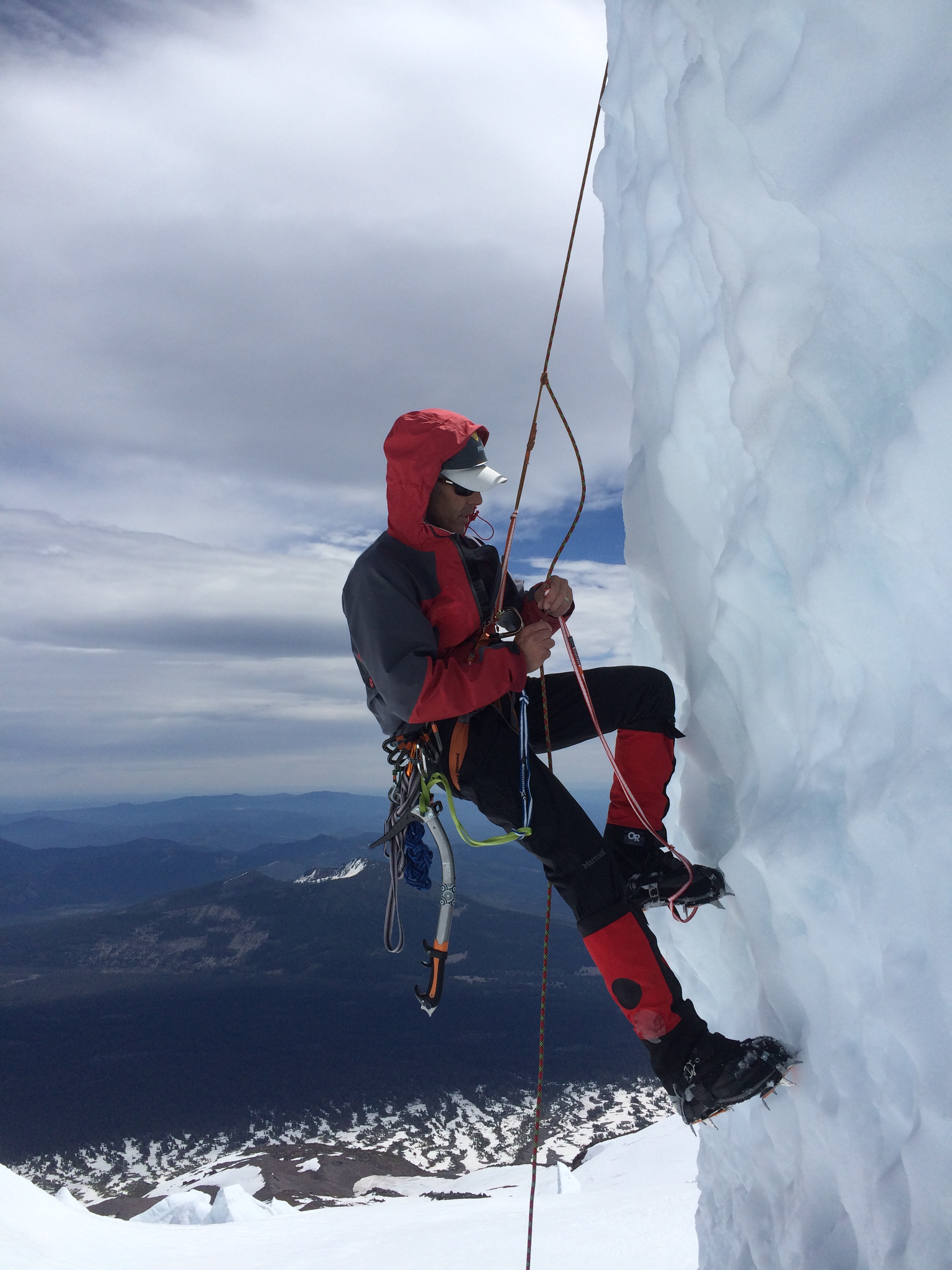
Climber using loops attached to prusik knots to move up a fixed rope

Climbers carry Prusik cords mainly for emergency use, as they are lighter than other options. Prusiks are fast to place on a rope, and with practice can be placed with one hand. The loops of cord can be used as slings, and are thus multi-functional in a climbing environment.

Prusiks will work around two ropes, even two ropes of different diameters. Prusiks provide a strong attachment that will not damage or break the rope, and so are used in some rope-rescue techniques. Prusiks are good to use in hauling systems where multiple rope-grabs may be needed, and where mechanical rope-grabs are not available.

Prusiks are far less likely to damage the main rope than mechanical rope-grabs such as a jumar. An overloaded Prusik will initially slip, causing no damage. If loaded to great excess, the worst result is that it slides until the heat of friction causes physical failure of the Prusik cord, rather than the rope. Mechanical rope-grabs when overloaded will sometimes damage the sheath of the rope, or in extreme cases sever the rope entirely.

Depending on which variant is used, Prusik hitches have the advantage of working in both directions. Most mechanical rope-grabs work like a ratchet, moving freely up the rope, but grabbing when a load is placed down on them. Traditional Prusiks (such as those shown below) will grab when pulled by the tail, either up or down, and will slide either way when pushed by the barrel.

Although the Prusik Climb technique may be seen as outdated by some, the US Army still includes it in its annual Best Ranger competition. Rangers in the competition routinely make it up a 65-foot (19.8 metre) rope in under a minute.

== Disadvantages ==
Prusiks are ineffective upon frozen wet ropes. This is due to the necessity of friction for the Prusik to function. Mechanical devices (such as jumars) to grab the rope are available that are easier and faster to use, but heavier, more expensive, and bulkier.

After being put under a great deal of weight, the Prusik can be quite constricted and difficult to untie. This varies, depending on the relative diameter of the ropes.

== Related hitches and equipment ==
Although Prusik can be used in a general way, the Prusik hitch is a specific hitch. The two main alternatives are the Bachmann knot and the Klemheist knot (see also the Tarbuck knot). Each has its advantages and disadvantages, mainly in how easy they are to use for climbing a rope. Another variation is the autoblock or French Prusik, used by some people as a backup knot while rappelling.

A Purcell Prusik is a related cord popular among cavers and rope-rescue people. A somewhat longer loop than the normal Prusik is used around the rope, then a second Prusik is used around the cord loop itself to form a foot loop. The foot loop is then easily adjusted in length and position.

A Prusik-Minding-Pulley is common in rope rescue. The rope to be pulled is passed through a pulley, and a Prusik is tied on the loaded side. When the rope is pulled, the Prusik rides against the pulley, and the rope slides through it; but when the rope is relaxed, the Prusik slides away from the pulley and grabs the rope. Thus, the combination acts as a ratchet (or Progress Capture Device (PCD)).

The Farrimond friction hitch is a kind of taut-line hitch that is similar in form to a Prusik.

== Equipment ==
A Prusik loop is made of narrow but strong nylon accessory cord tied into a loop using a double fisherman's knot. A sling or Prusik-dedicated sewn loop can also be used. A short piece of rope spliced to form a circle is called a becket. Note that Dyneema/Spectra has a very low melting point and should not be used in Prusik hitches unless the cord or sling is specifically engineered for it (as seen in some sheathed constructions). The length of this loop depends on the application. For instance, the loop used for an Auto-Bloc might only be 20 cm, whereas the foot loop for climbing a rope might work better with a length of 100 cm or more. As a general rule, longer loops are preferable over shorter ones, as a loop can always be shortened by tying a knot in it.

The effectiveness of the Prusik hitch relies on the surface area between the hitch and the main line, and the diameter of the cord used. Normally, the greater the difference between the diameter of the cord used for the hitch and the main line, the greater the ability for the hitch to hold. However, the smaller the diameter of the cord used, the lower its safe working load. In addition, smaller diameter cords often jam too tight when placed under load, and are hard to handle when wearing gloves.

== Tying ==
The Prusik is tied by wrapping the "tail" of the Prusik loop around the rope a number of times, usually 2-4 times depending on the materials, (each time, through the other (bow) end), forming a barrel around the rope with a tail hanging out from the middle. When the tail is weighted, the turns tighten and make a slight bend in the rope. When weight is removed, the loop can be moved along the rope by placing a hand directly on the barrel or pushing it from "behind". Breaking the Prusik free from the rope after it has been weighted can be difficult, and is most easily done by pushing the bow, (the loop of cord which runs along the barrel, from the top wrap to the bottom wrap), along the tail a little. This unwinds the barrel wraps to loosen the grip of the hitch, and makes movement easier.
Note: Step 2 is also called a girth hitch (a single wrap) and is not a good Prusik (yet). Note: Step 4 has a twist in the webbing that is inconsistent with the preceding images, but will not affect use except to make it slightly more difficult to loosen after a heavy loading. (Of course, this is not an issue when using normal round cord for the Prusik.)

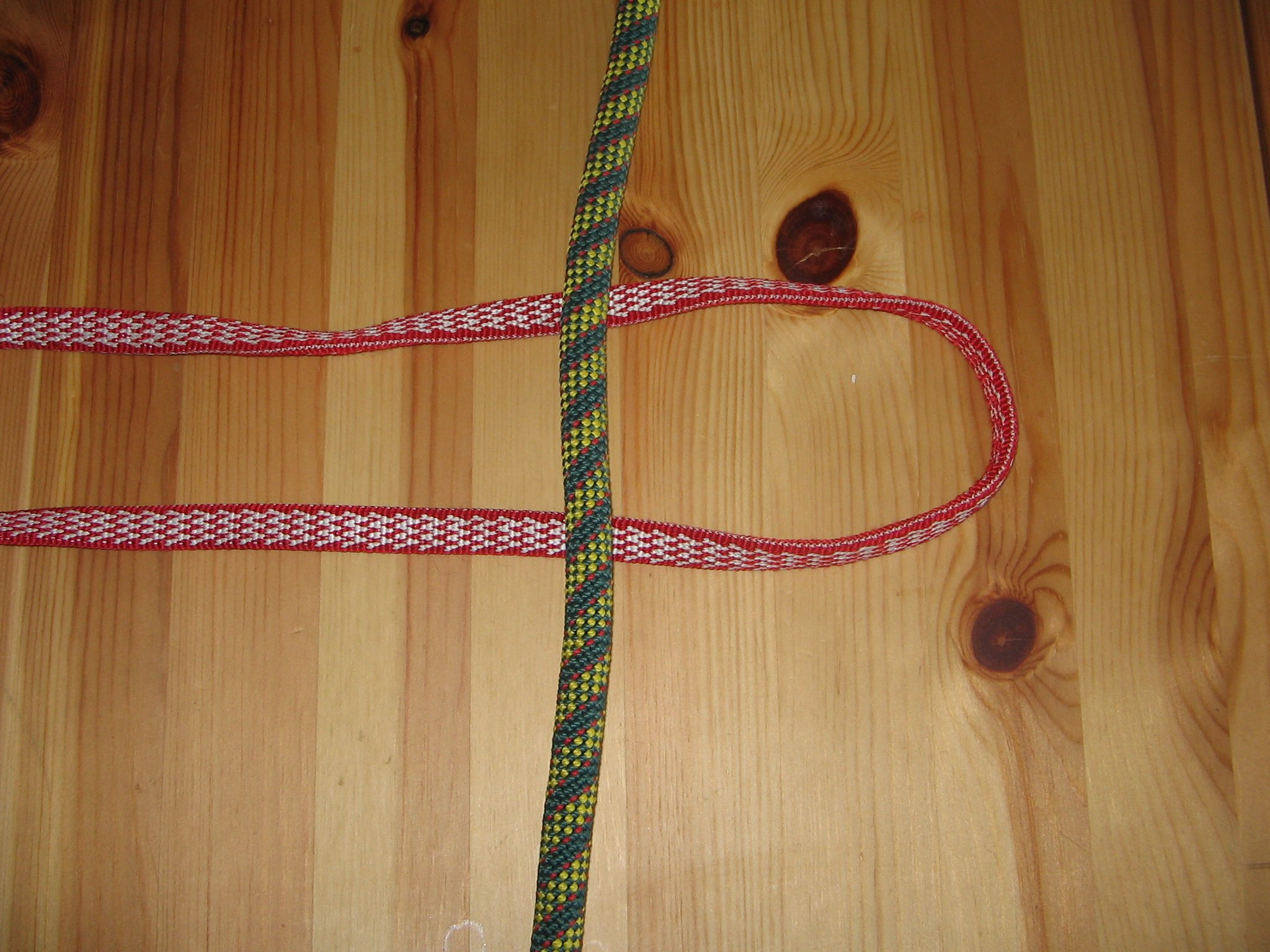
Step 1.

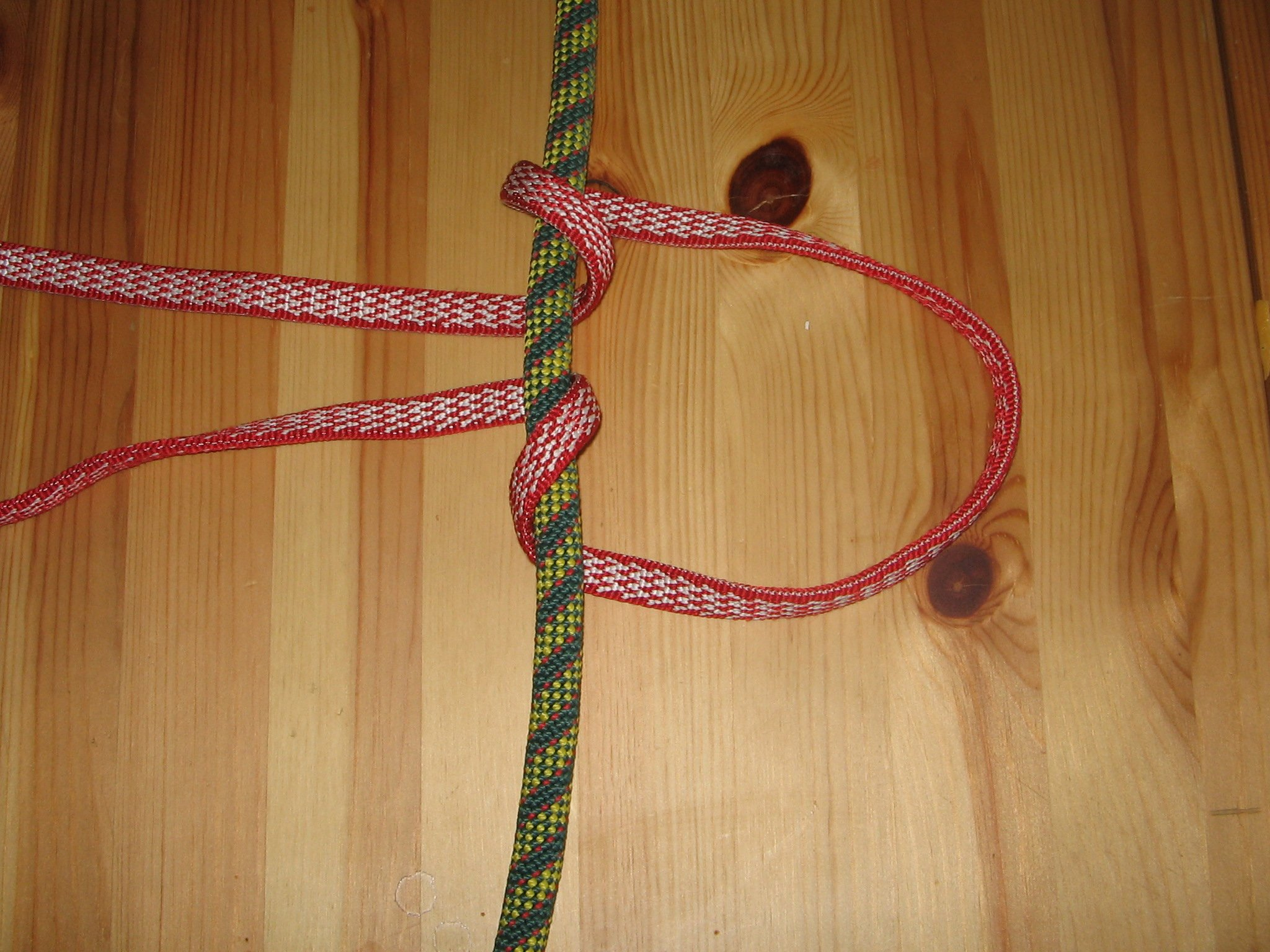
Step 2.

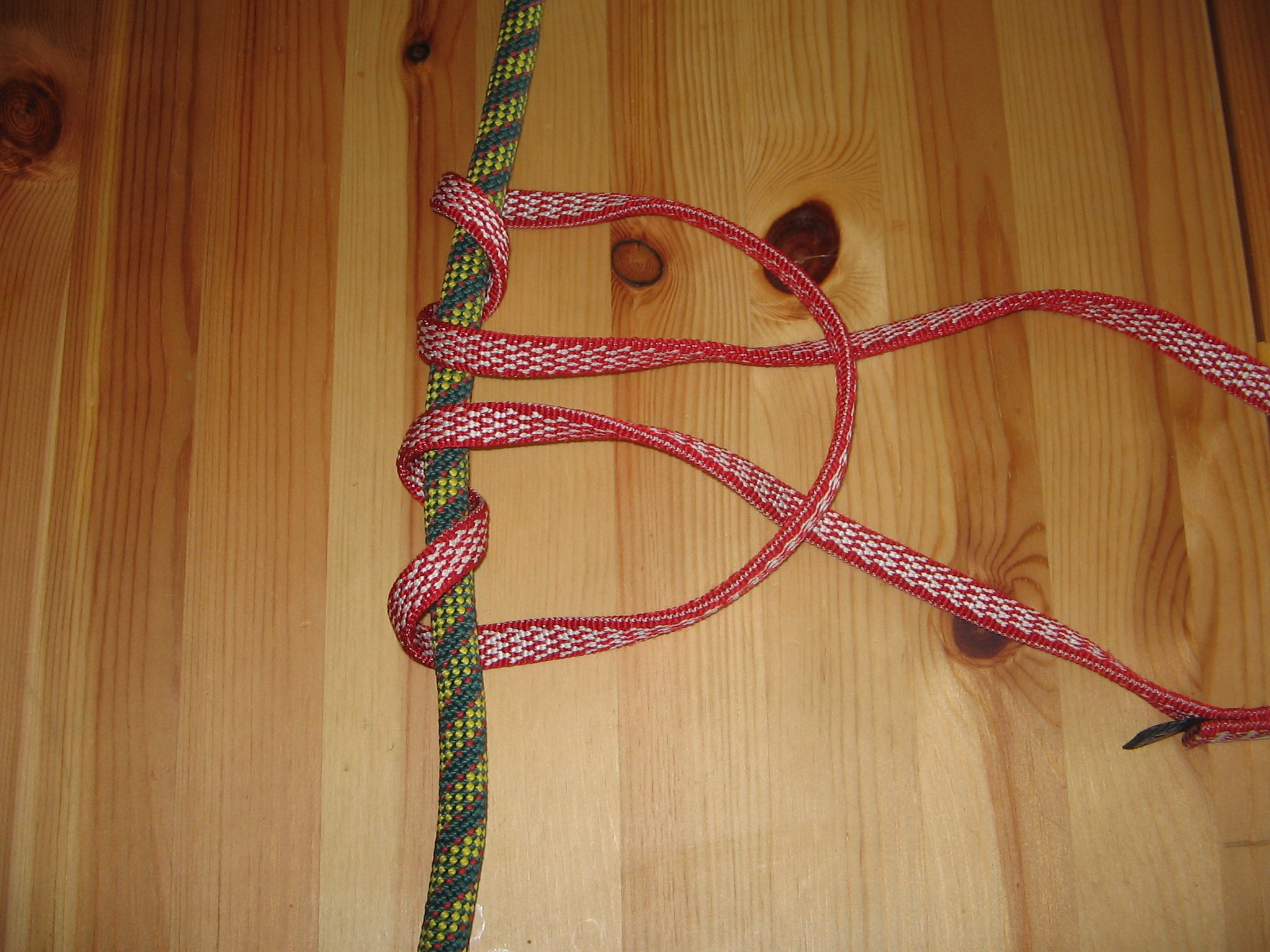
Step 3.

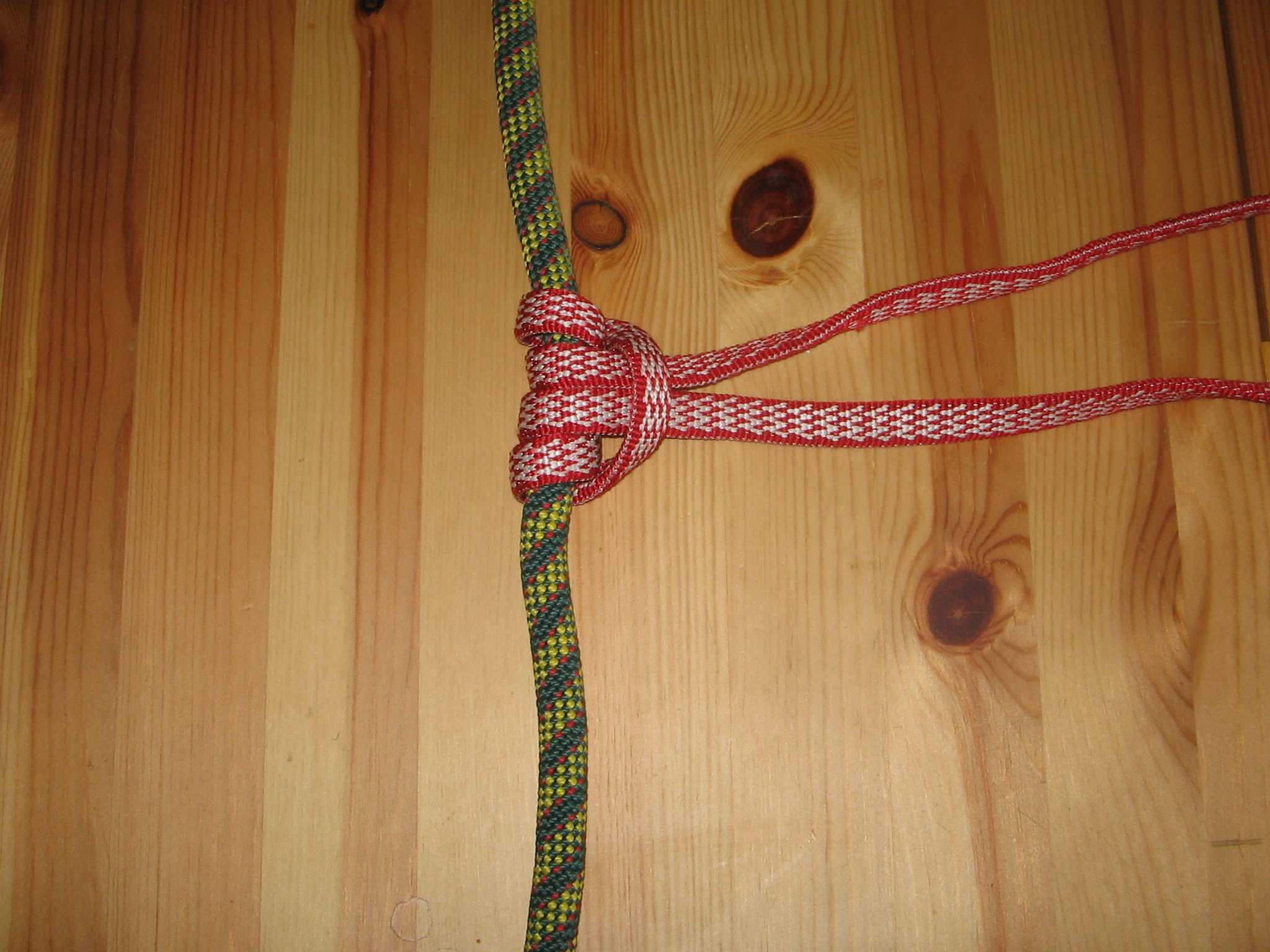
Step 4.

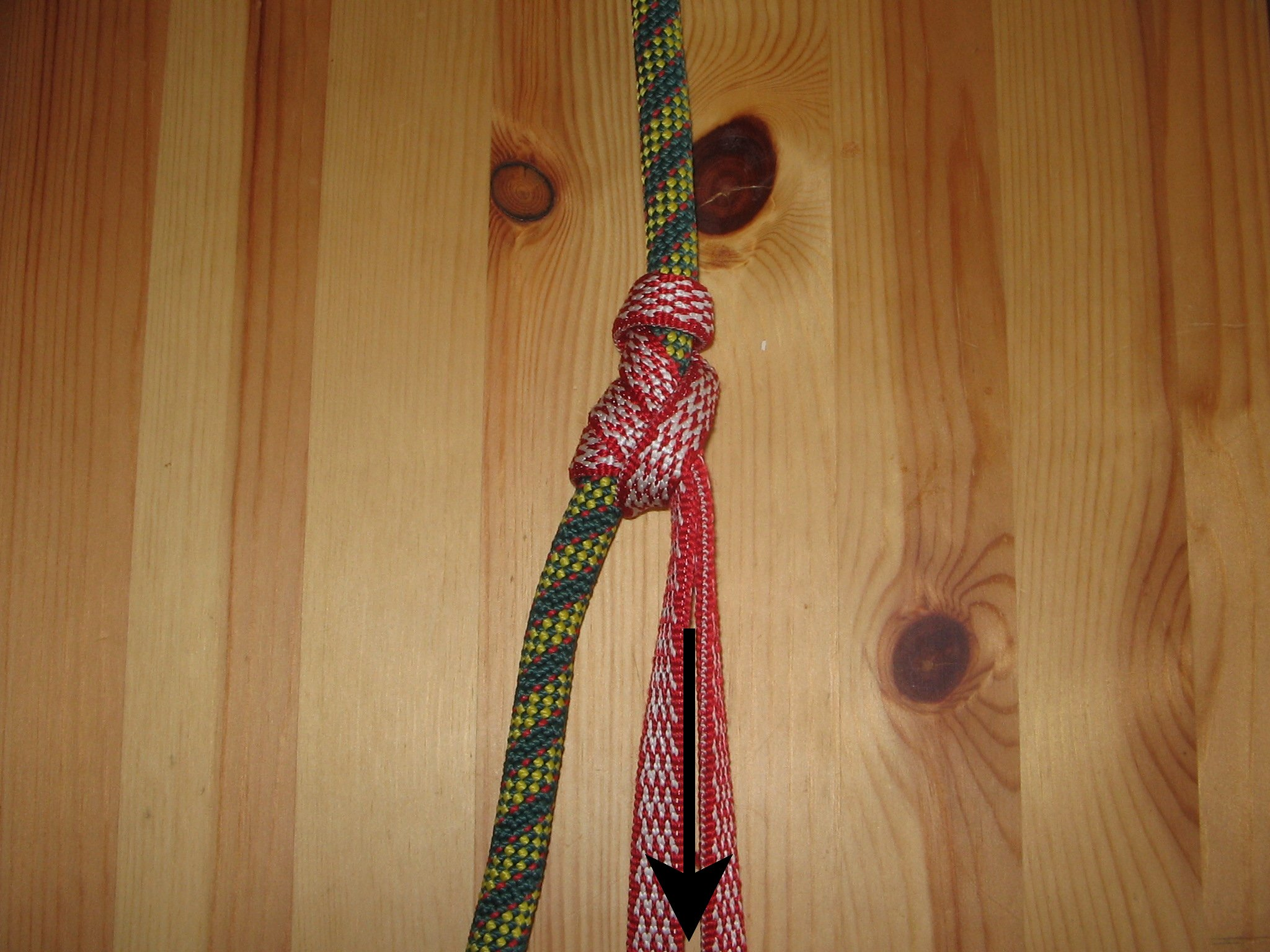
Locked while holding tension.

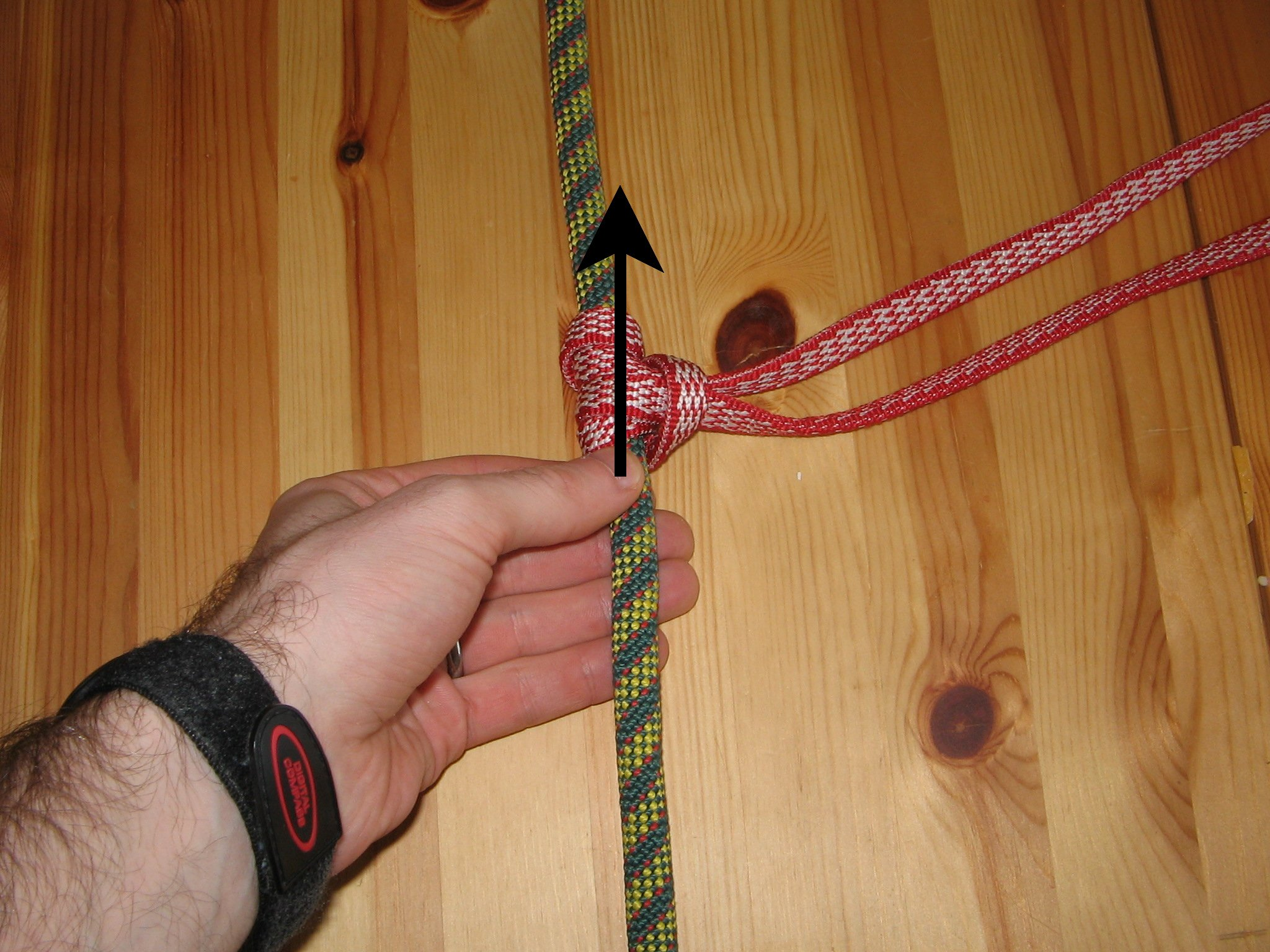
Slides readily without tension.

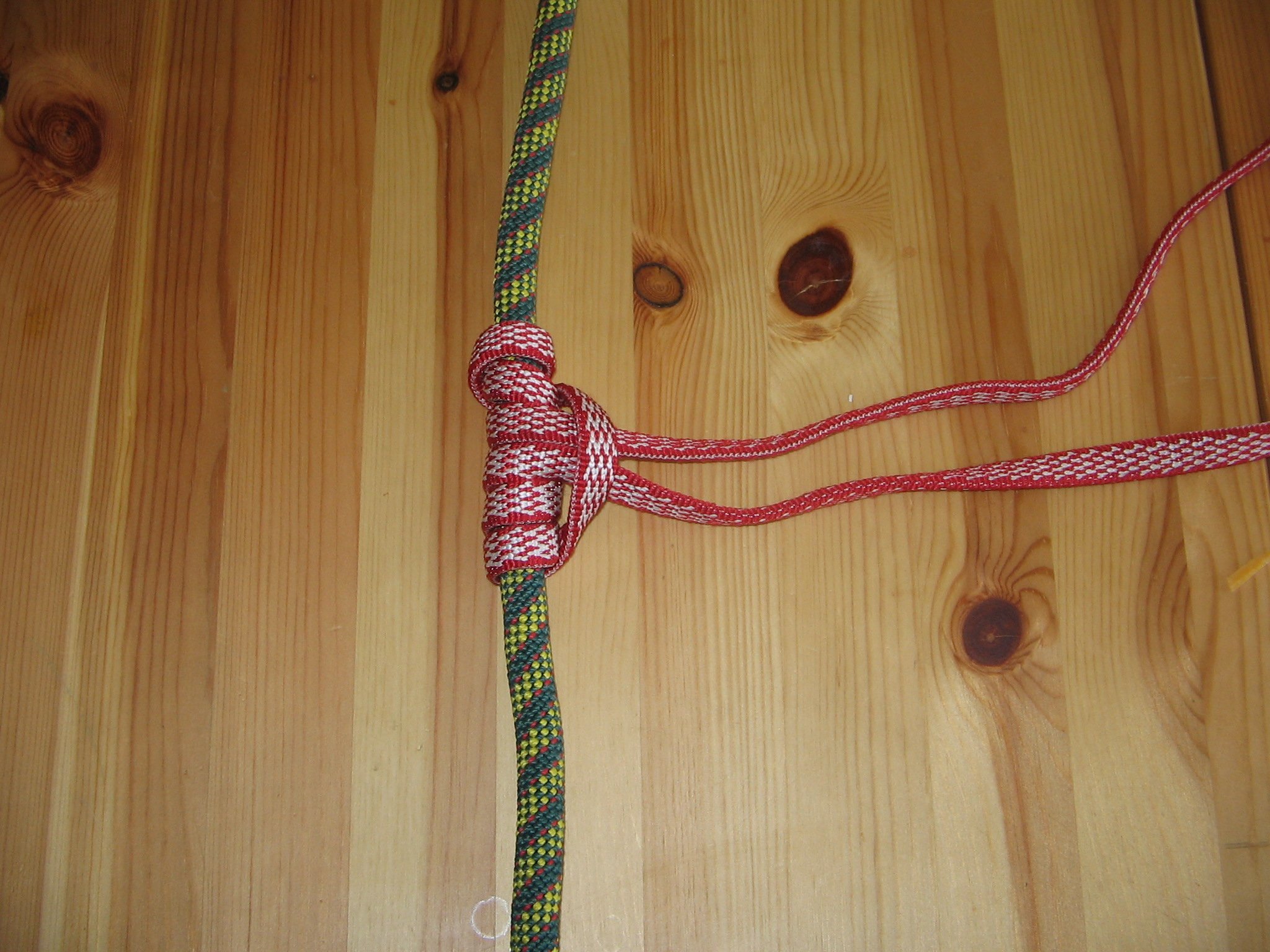
A variation of the Prusik knot with additional friction.

Many materials may be used to tie a Prusik. The Prusik knot illustrated above is made with webbing, however webbing is not recommended for heavier loads and/or securing a person since it has been shown to slip. Adding more wraps increases the grip.

A double strap or sling for hoisting a spar at middle length. One bight is rove through the other and a tackle is hooked to the single bight.

— The Ashley Book of Knots

== Applications ==
In addition to being a useful rope-grab for rope-rescue applications, Prusiks are popular for:

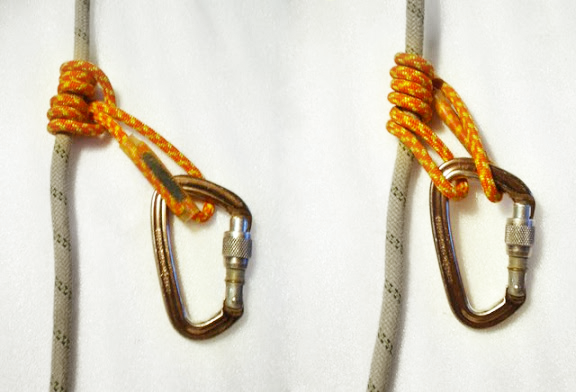
- A Prusik (left) and autoblock (right). Both are used as rappel backups.
  Rappel backup/self-belay below the device: A Prusik is placed below the descender and controlled with the brake hand. It acts as an automatic 'dead man's handle' should the climber be incapacitated or need to use both hands. Careful setup of the rappel backup is critical. An 'autoblock' or 'French Prusik' knot is most widely used in this application.
- Rappel backup/self-belay above the device: A Prusik is placed above the descender and controlled with the hand not being used as the brake hand. This configuration allows an easier and faster transition from rappelling to climbing the rope, but can also result in the Prusik locking tight as the amount of friction required to hold the load at that point is far higher than that experienced by a self-belay below the device.
- Prusiking or ascending the line: Two Prusiks used in tandem can be used to climb a fixed rope. One Prusik is attached to the belay loop sewn onto the front of a harness, and the other attached below that is a longer length of cord reaching to one foot. The climber can then stand up in the foot loop, slide the Prusik hitch of the waist loop further up the rope and then "sit" down on it. Once in the sitting position, the climber can slide the foot loop up the rope and repeat the process.
- Escaping the belay: In a lead-climbing situation, should the climber become incapacitated in a position where they cannot be safely lowered to the ground, the belayer must escape the belay in order to effect rescue. After locking the rope in the belay device with one hand, the belayer can tie a Prusik to the rope with the other hand, and then use the Prusik loop to transfer the load to a fixed anchor. The belayer can then go to effect rescue or get help.
- Rescue applications: Rope rescue teams, such as in swiftwater rescue or in high-angle technical rescue, use a Prusik hitch as a 'ratchet' or progress capture device. A Prusik with a Prusik minding pulley is used to hold a load while tensioning a line. The pulley advances the Prusik up the line and prevents it from going back out. This can be used to raise a patient or tension a highline for a Tyrolean traverse, or in boat-on-tether and similar rescue operations.
- Handcuffs
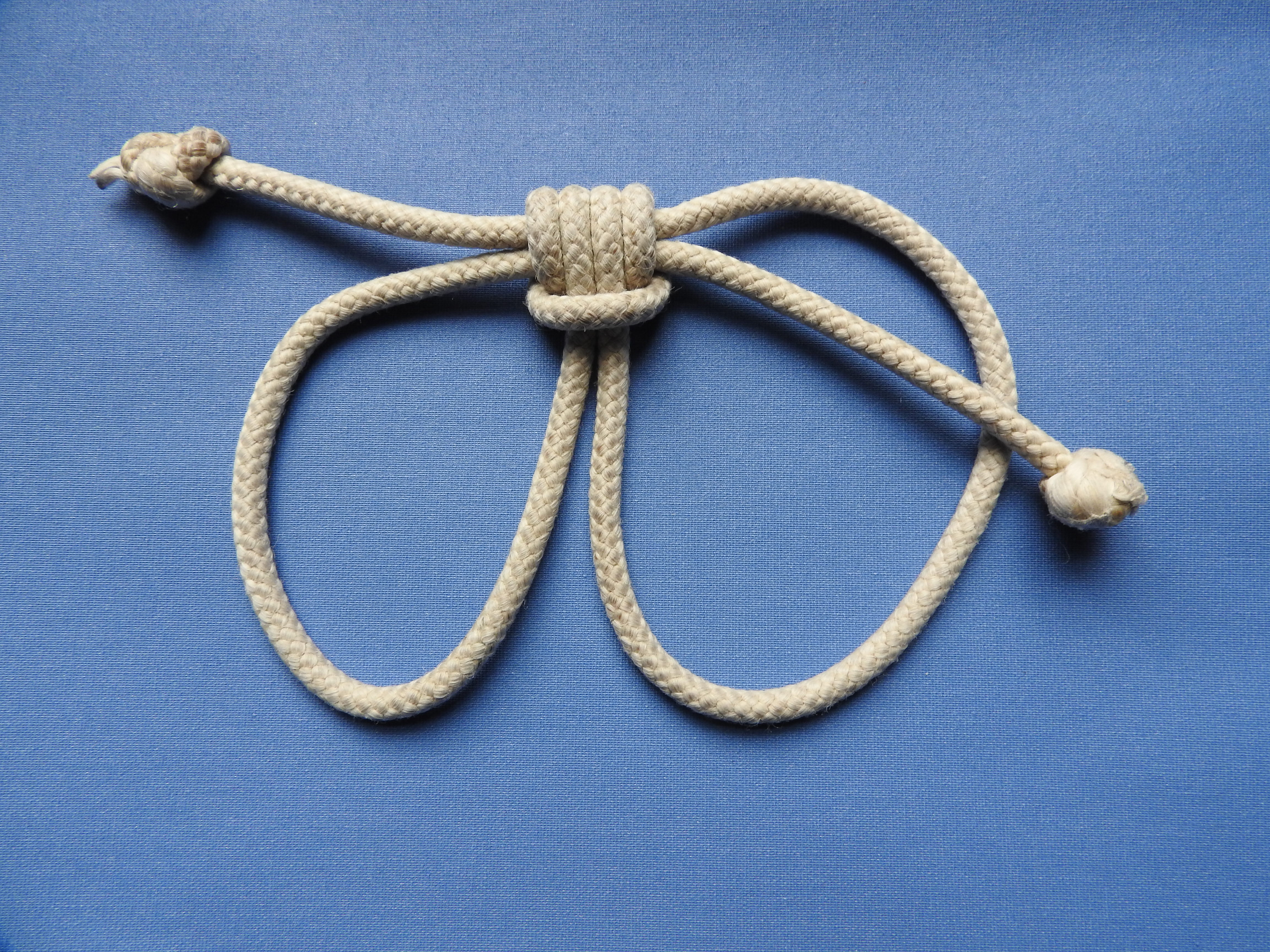
  Bosun's or Prusik handcuffs
  A length of rope that has been tied so that the Prusik knot is tied around itself leaving two large loops can be quickly used as handcuffs by slipping the loops around the detainee's hands and pulling the running ends tight and securing them with a square knot. When the detainee attempts to pull his hands apart, the Prusik tightens in the same way as when it is tied to another rope. To create Prusik handcuffs, tie a loose Prusik around one of your fingers and then slip it off, leaving the knot shape intact. Then slip the free ends of the rope through the "hole" in the knot where your finger used to be. Alternatively, use a handcuff knot, which is the more usual knot to accomplish this task.
- Testing rigs for tensile strength and pull force: RepRap researchers have used the Prusik knot to secure a fiber in order to measure the pull force of an extruder mechanism and estimate the tensile strength of a fiber.

== When to carry (climbing, kayaking) ==
All sorts of climbers carry Prusiks as standard equipment "just in case". Prusiks are unlikely to be needed on short climbs where the climber can be readily lowered to the ground; conversely, they may prove useful where the climber cannot be lowered, for instance from a high cliff or due to a hazard underneath the climber.

Prusiks can be tied using other climbing equipment, such as slings already carried by the climber. Three loops allow the climber to pass a knot in the rope, a difficult task without a third loop.

Kayaking: For kayaking, a Prusik can be used in a similar way as in climbing; for rescuing people and equipment from a river, a Prusik or two with a set of pulleys to create a Z-drag is preferred.

Camping, hiking and bushcraft: The Prusik Knot can be used to attach a tarpaulin or shelter to a ridge line, as they can easily be slid along the line to the required position without damaging the line.

== See also ==
- Aid climbing
- Ascender (climbing)
- List of friction hitch knots
- List of knots
