= Ascender (climbing) =

Devices used for ascending, braking, or protection in climbing

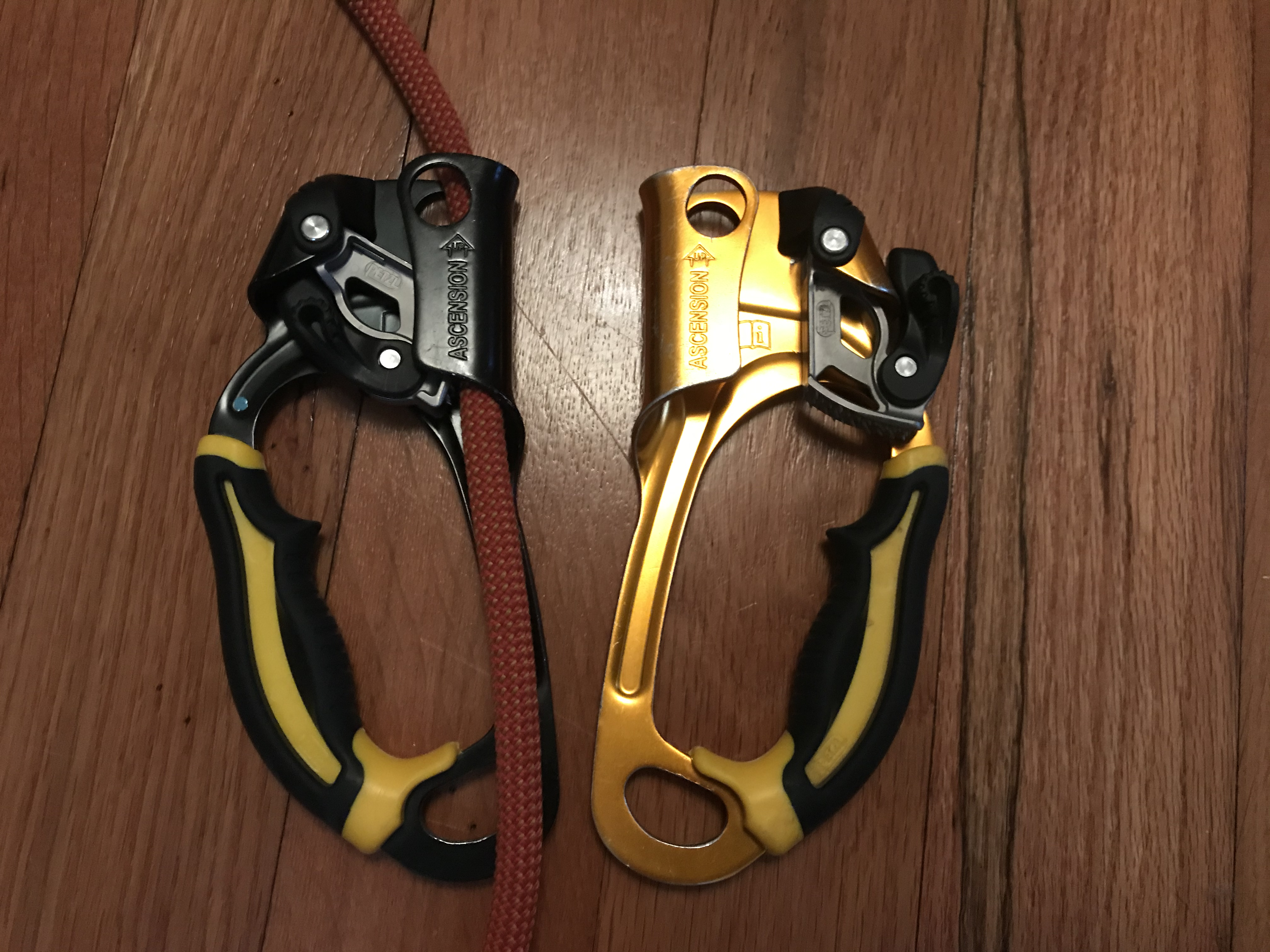
A pair of left- and right-handed ascenders (the left rigged to a rope)

An ascender is a device (usually mechanical) used for directly ascending, or for facilitating protection, with a fixed rope when climbing on steep mountain terrain. A form introduced in the 1950s became so popular it began the term "Jumar" for the device, and the verb "to jumar" to describe its use in ascending.

Ascenders can also be used as braking components within a rope-hauling system, often used in rescue situations.

== Use ==
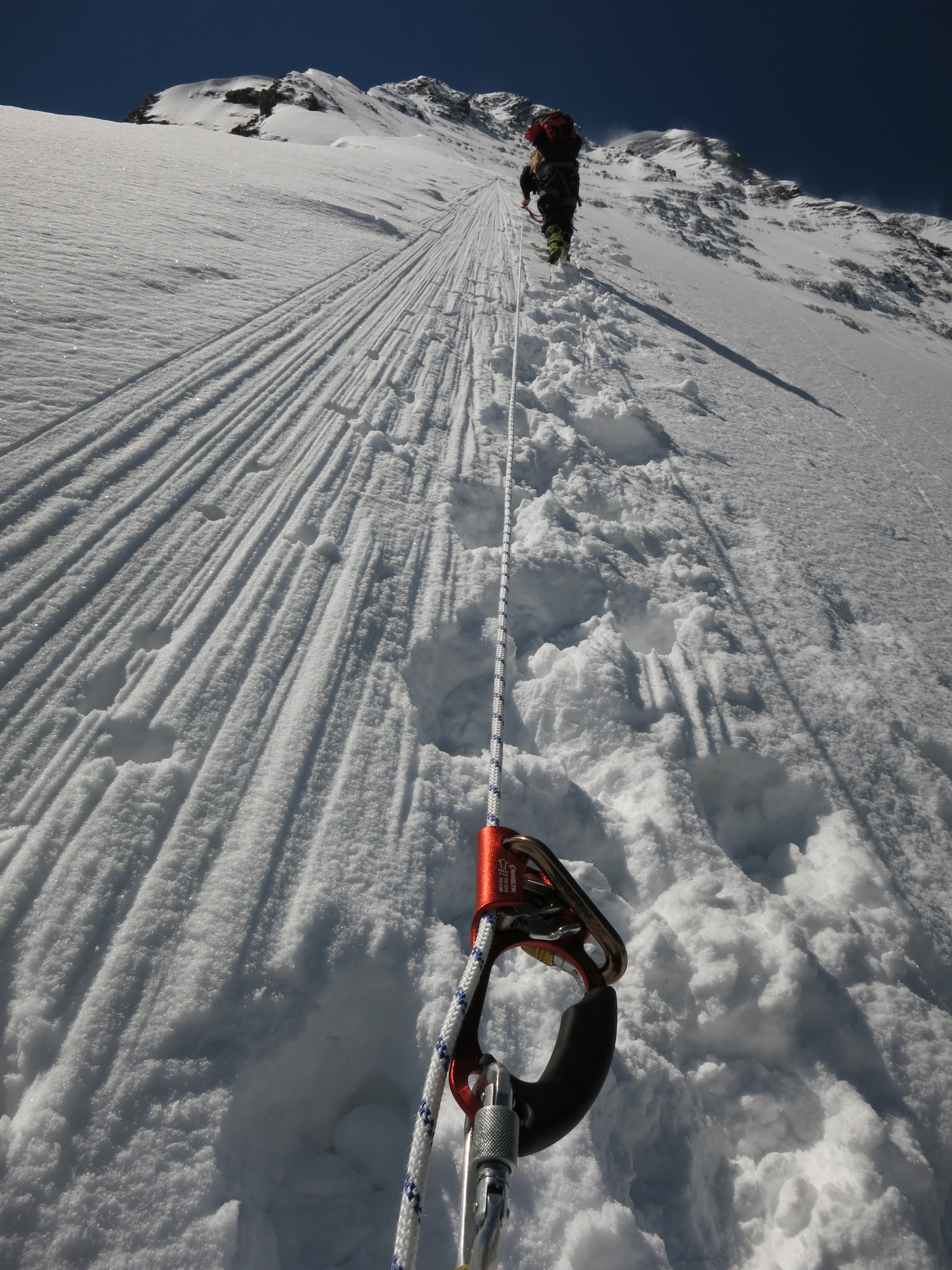
Ascenders in use on a single rope on a steep mountain slope, offering the two climbers both security plus an additional aid to their upward ascent. Note that they are not roped together, but are climbing independently of one another.

Ascenders are usually used in pairs on a single rope and offer similar functionality to friction knots, but are faster, safer, and easier to use, albeit still with consequences in weight and in security (as ascenders can, even with a locking carabiner, come off the rope, and fail by shredding the rope at high loads, rather than slipping and fusing as with friction knots). A mechanical ascender employs a cam which allows the device to slide freely in the intended direction of movement, but provides a firm grip on the rope when pulled in the opposite direction. To prevent an ascender from accidentally coming off the rope, a locking mechanism or trigger is deployed. The ascender is first attached to the climber's harness by a piece of webbing or sling and then is clipped onto the rope and locked on.

Ascenders are usually used in pairs so that one is free to be slid up the rope whilst the other bears the weight of the climber. The ascender which has just been slid upwards is then made to take the climber's load, locking the climber to the rope, and freeing the other one so it can then be slid upwards too. The process is then repeated to ascend the rope.

For climbing with a fixed rope attached for security (for example, to snow anchors on a steep slope), only one ascender is used, keeping the other hand free for holding an ice axe.

Ascenders are not used on free climbing routes, where a climber uses only one's hands and feet on the features of the rock without artificial aids to gain elevation (though mechanical aids purely for protection are acceptable). Instead, they are used in aid climbing, where aids to ascending and weighting "protection" to assist elevation gain is allowed.

The climbing verb "to jumar" means to use an ascender (generically) to "climb" a rope, regardless of whether it is done in sport climbing, caving, in occupations that require working from (or being protected by) ropes, or a rescue. A form of sport climbing exists where the "second" belays the leader, then follows "up the rope" without climbing the rock or ice using an ascender. Terms applying to such a second's ascent include "jumaring", "ascending", and "jugging".

== History ==
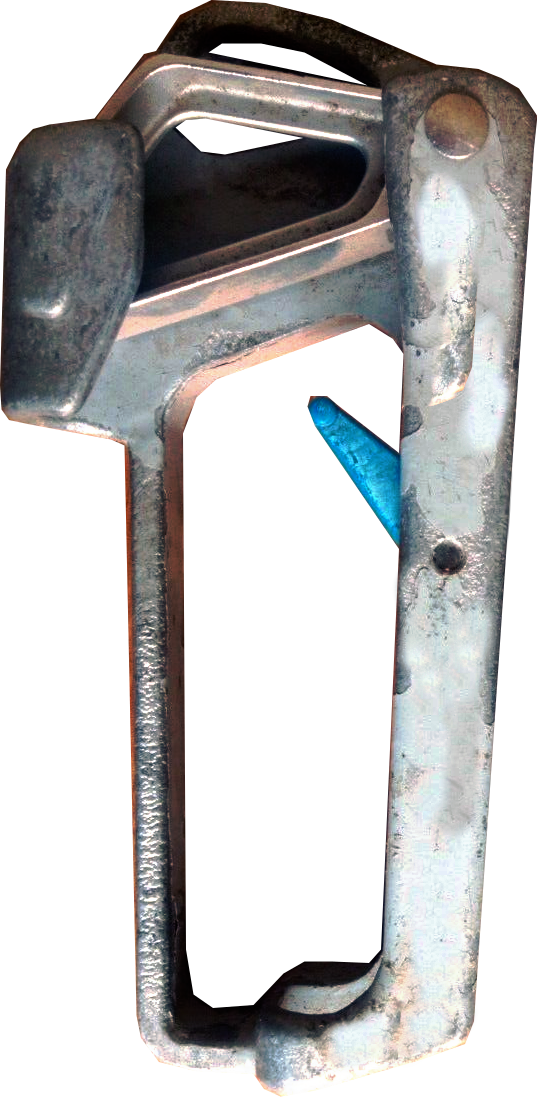
Jumar rope ascender (c. 1975)

Mechanical ascenders have existed for centuries, with numerous patents from the 1800s, and earlier devices being described in books and manuscripts. The majority were developed for rope access.

Mechanical rope-ascending devices were created by Henri Brenot, and were used in France both for mountaineering and caving as early as 1934.

A popular example of the ascender is the jumar, named for its inventors Adolph Jüsi and Walter Marti and the Swiss firm Jümar Pangit they created to manufacture it, beginning in 1958. Jusi was studying eagles for the Swiss Government, and desired an ascender (rather than relying on the traditional technique of prusiking using friction knots); Marti developed one for him.

French caver Fernand Petzl developed a mechanical rope ascender in 1968, and his company Petzl continues to produce both handled and handleless models that are popular with mountaineers and cavers today.

In his 1978 memoir Life Is Meeting, John Hunt, leader of the 1953 British Mount Everest expedition, credits the jumar with enabling climbers "to climb at alpine standards even at high altitudes".

Other countries, notably the United States, have also produced rope ascenders. Other names for different specialized styles of ascenders include "ropeman" and "tibloc".

== Versus friction knots ==
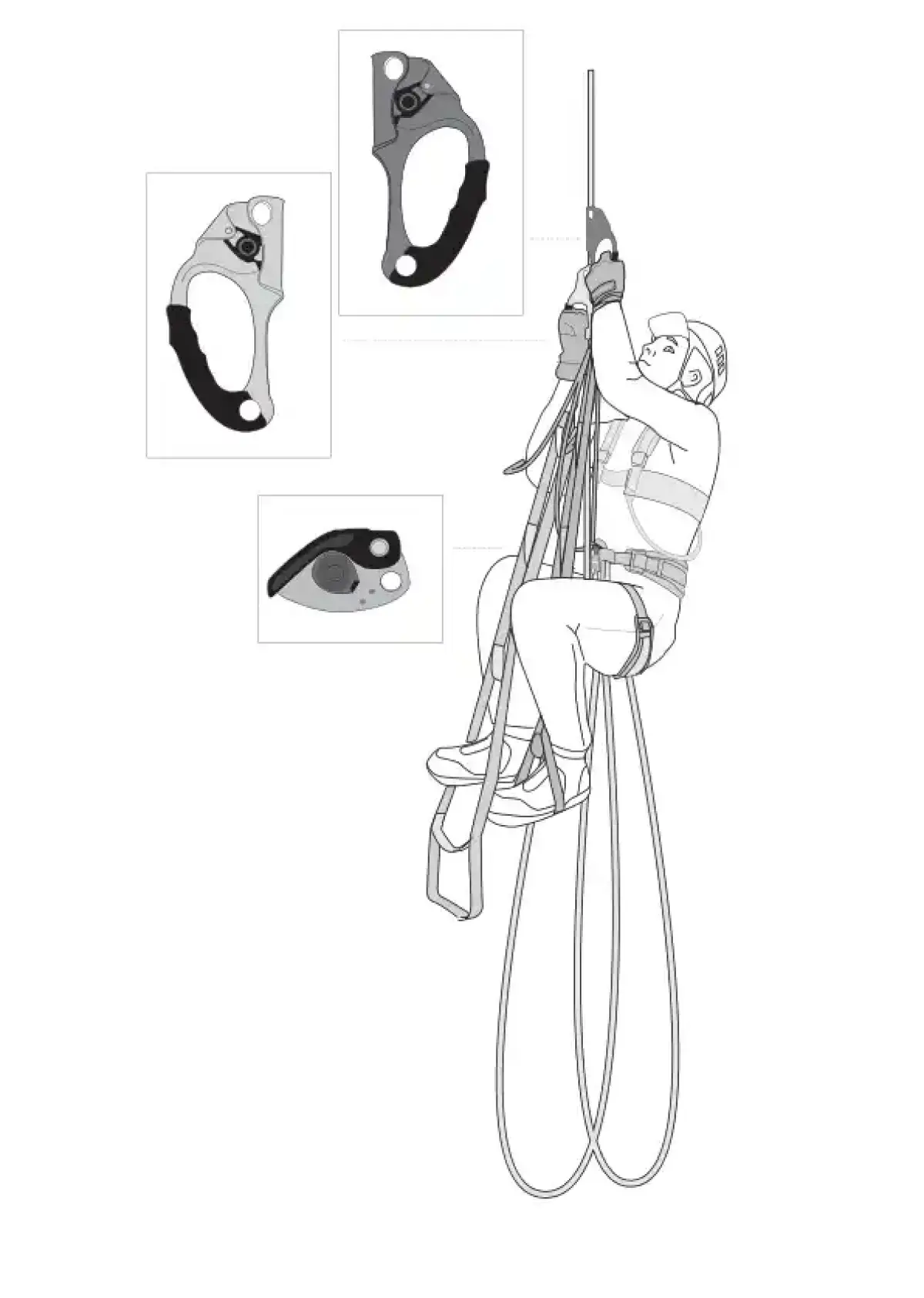
Using ascenders in to jumar up a fixed rope.

When used correctly, ascenders are safe and dependable and require less effort and dexterity of a climber than the traditional method of ascending and descending ropes using friction knots and short lengths of cordage (or nylon slings) known as prusiks.

The principal disadvantages of ascenders relative to the prusiks are weight, complexity, and possibility of failure due to coming off a rope or mechanical issue with the device.

Certain specialty forms of ascender—but not all—are capable of taking a dynamic load (as in preventing a fall), whereas the friction knot/Prusik combination may abrade the synthetic sheath of the climbing rope or sling and fuse under such extreme forces.
