= Klemheist knot =

Type of knot

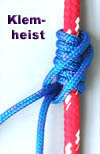
- Names: Klemheist knot, French Machard knot
- Category: Hitch
- Related: Prusik knot, Bachmann knot, Blake's hitch
- Typical use: Rock climbing
- ABoK: #1762
- Instructions

The klemheist knot or French Machard knot is a type of friction hitch that grips the rope when weight is applied, and is free to move when the weight is released. It is used similarly to a Prusik knot or the Bachmann knot to ascend or descend a climbing rope. One advantage is that webbing can be used as an alternative to cord. The Klemheist is easier to slide up than a Prusik. The klemheist is also a way to attach a snubber to the anchor rope of small boats, with the advantage that it is easy to undo.

Sometimes the knot name is misspelled as "kleimheist", with an extra "i".

== Technique ==
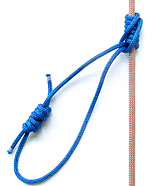
Klemheist knot with loop

Make a secure loop of a cord (see Double fisherman's knot) that is definitely narrower than the rope. Wrap from one end around the rope two or three times in a direction that will be down. The number of turns depends on the material and the desired friction. The loose end is then threaded through the starting end, and carefully tightened to leave the wraps neat. In use, strain must be taken only on the hanging end. If the knot slips when load is placed on the hanging loop, re-tie around the climbing rope another time or two, until there is no slippage. Holding around the wraps will let you slide the knot up or down. Making the wraps slide when the hitch is under tension will create friction heat on the rope and the knot.

== Knot Variations ==
Straight

Klemheist Hitch is the straight variant of the knot. It regularly finds use in tensioning tyrolean traverses as well.

Reverse

The reverse variant of the knot, Hedden Hitch (also known as the Kreuzklem or Hedden Knot) is often described as an "upside-down" Klemheist, where the load-bearing bight wraps from the top of the coils rather than the bottom. First introduced to the climbing world by Chet Hedden in a 1960 issue of Summit Magazine, this dependable knot is widely praised as being more reliable than the Klemheist, typically requiring just one fewer spiral turn to securely hold its ground. This variant often used for self-belay on vertical fixed ropes (similarly to the Prusik knot). Loops are made with the sling around the fixed rope from top to bottom.

Autoblock

The Autoblock (Machard knot or French Prusik), is essentially the same knot, but in the final stage, both loops are clipped into a carabiner rather than passing one through the other.

== See also ==
- List of knots
- List of friction hitch knots
