= Outline of caves =

Overview of and topical guide to caves

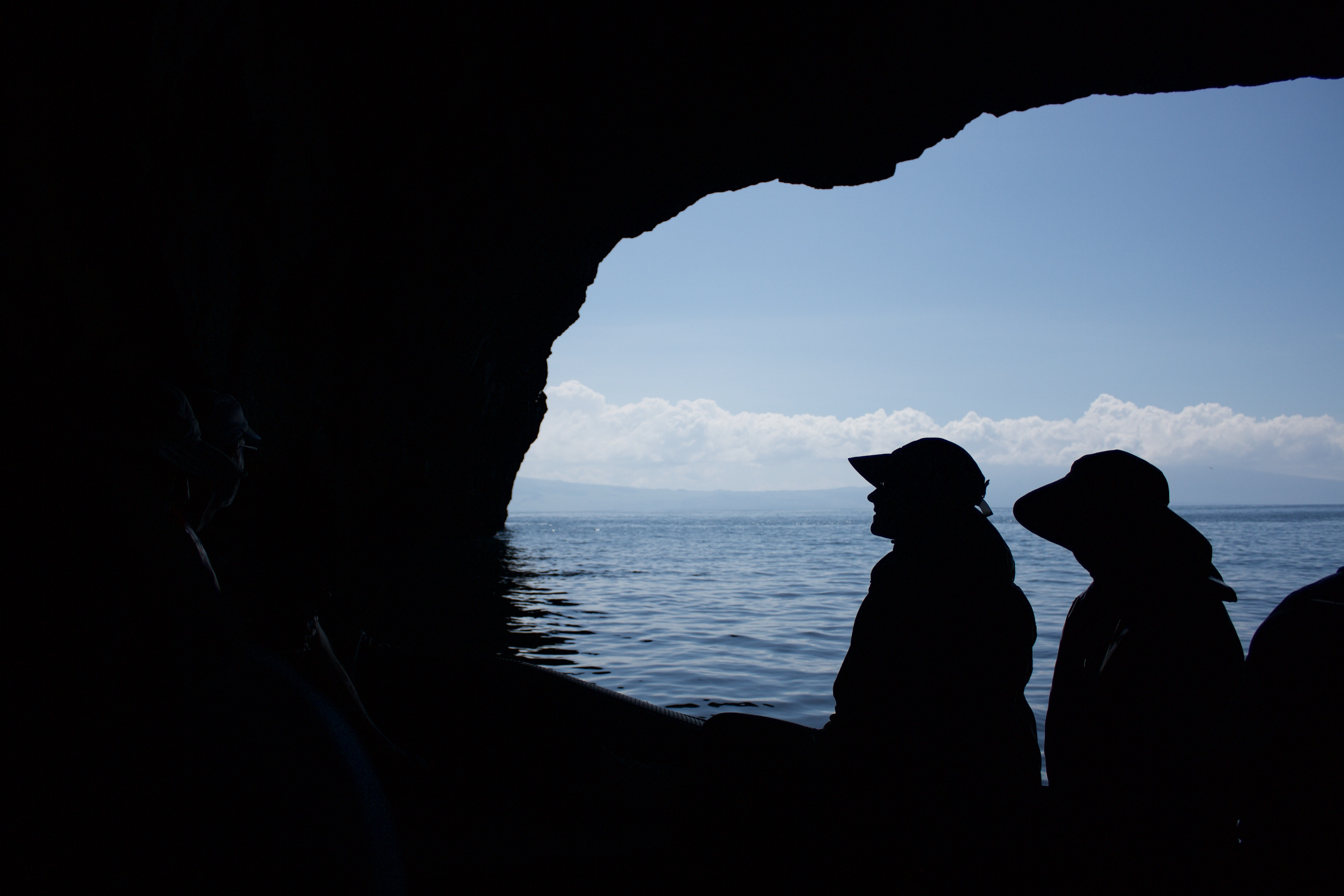
Tourists in a sea cave in the Galápagos Islands

The following outline provides an overview of and topical guide to natural caves. The word cave is loosely defined, but most commonly refers to a natural opening large enough to be entered by a human. These landforms are common around the world, and have even been detected on the Moon and Mars. This outline's scope is limited to these natural formations, specifically excluding the rock-cut features which are often referred to as caves in Eastern Asia.

== Types of cave ==
Worldwide, lava tubes, karst caves, and rock shelters are the most common varieties of cave. Karst caves typically form through dissolution of limestone by carbonic acid, but some caves, such as Lechuguilla, have instead been formed from the bottom up via sulfuric acid released from oil reservoirs. Wherever exposed limestone is present these karst caves are likely to form. Lava tubes are common in volcanic areas, and form during effusive volcanic eruptions, serving as a conduit for lava to flow through. Both types can reach great lengths. Kazumra Cave, the longest known lava tube, has nearly 41 miles or 66 kilometers of mapped passage, and the longest known cave, Mammoth Cave, has over 426 miles of mapped passage as of 2024. Many rock shelters are important scientific and archeological sites. As sheltered areas, they often served as temporary and more permanent homes for early humans and other members of the Homo genus, many of whom left behind both artifacts and remains.

Many other types of caves exist, but are significantly less prevalent and require rarer environments to form.

=== Caves by speleogenesis ===
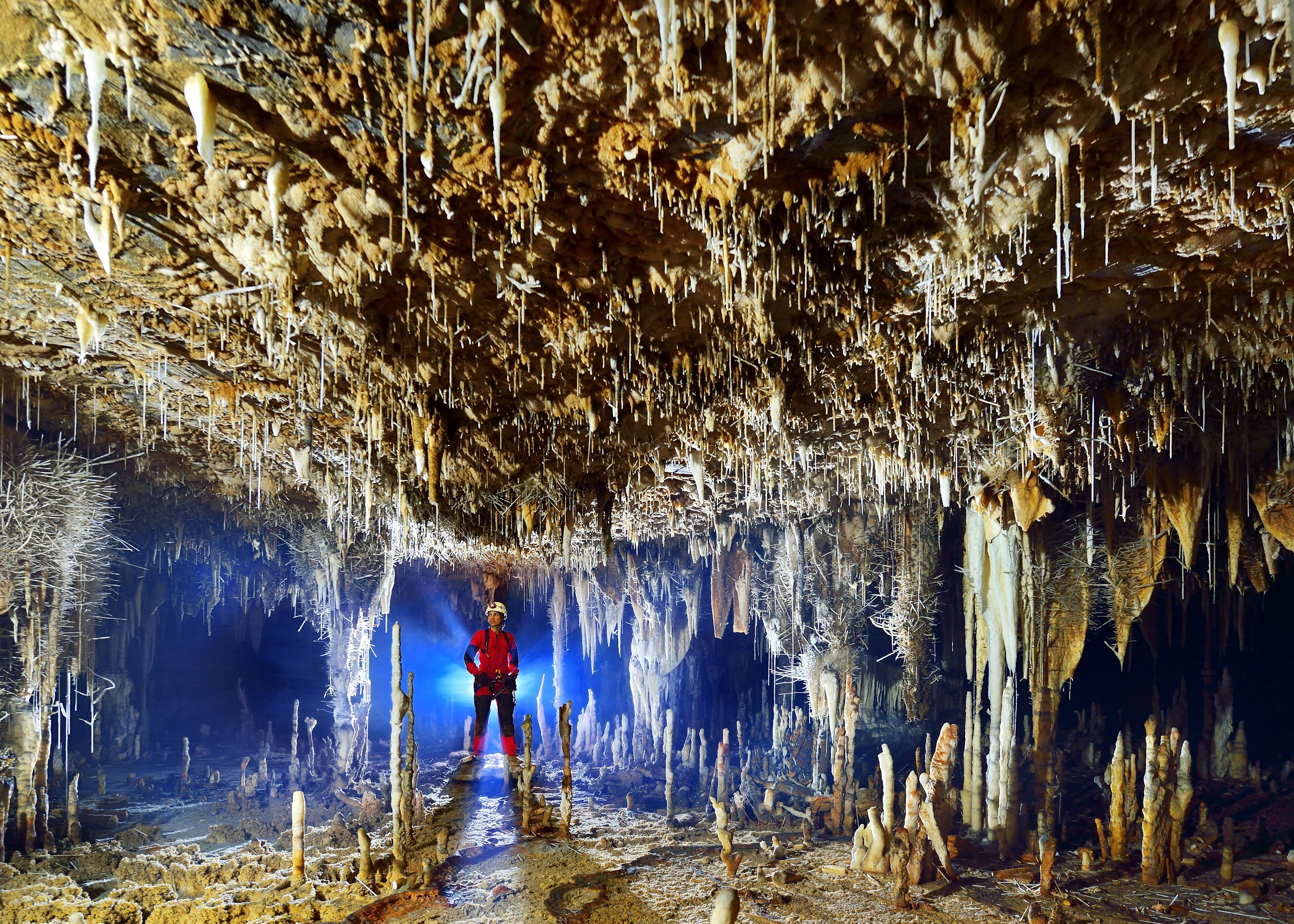
Karst cave in Brazil

- Karst caves – caves formed in karst, the most common type of cave.
- Talus caves – piles of collapsed rocks with navigable space inside.
- Erosional caves – caves formed through erosion not corrosion.
- Soil piping caves - caves formed through hydraulic removal of poorly consolidated subsurface soils.
- Sea caves – caves formed in sea cliffs, typically through wave action.
- Salt caves – caves formed within rock salt by dissolution.
- Fracture caves – caves formed in the fractures inside a larger rock unit.
- Glacial caves – caves formed within glacial ice.
- Lava caves – caves formed in volcanic rock.
  - Lava tubes – primary caves formed as lava conduits during volcanic eruptions.
    - Lunar lava tubes – lava tubes on the Moon.
    - Martian lava tubes – lava tubes on Mars.
  - Open vertical conduits – vertical lava tubes.
  - Pit crater – craters that can form when magma doesn't reach the surface.
  - Lava mold caves – form around trees or large animals, leaving molds of the object.
- Rock shelters – overhangs of rock, typically illuminated by natural light.

=== Caves by contents ===
- Ice caves – caves that hold ice within them during most or all of the year.
- Pit cave – largely vertical cave.
- Breathing cave – caves where barometric pressure causes airflow.

== Cave geology ==
Caves are commonly linked to karstic or volcanic environments, and as such, much of their geology is linked to these geologic contexts. Subterranean features and surface features are both highly dependent on geology. Karst caves tend to have water-based features, like waterfalls and rivers, while lava tubes contain their own set of features, many of which resemble igneous versions of karstic counterparts. Some are shared, like moonmilk and other calcite-based speleothems.

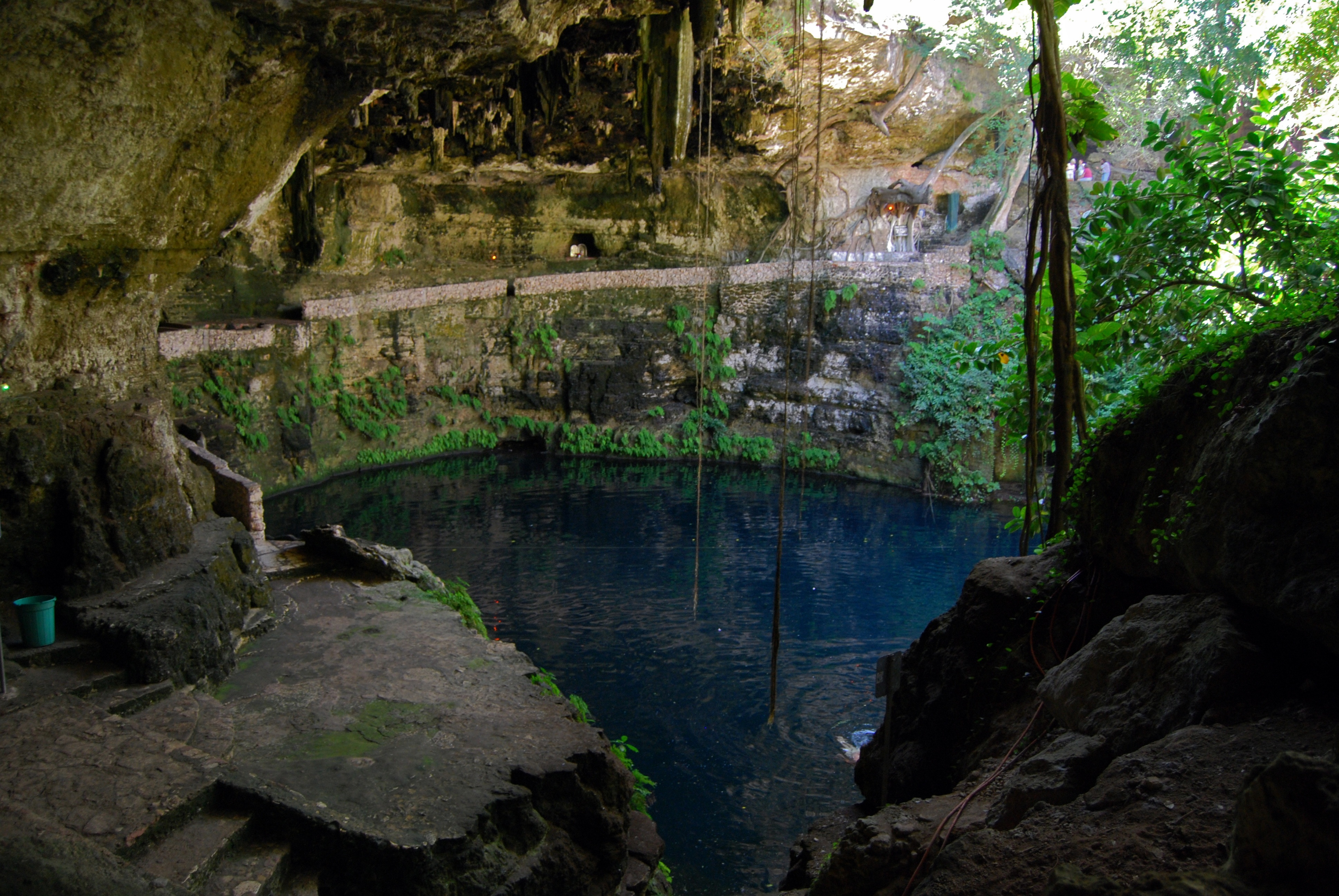
Cenote Zaci, in Yucatan

=== Surface features ===
==== Karst surface features ====
- Karst springs – springs that often carry cave water.
- Karst windows – small section of an underground river that is exposed to the surface.
- Limestone – calcium carbonate based sedimentary rock that often forms caves.
- Losing streams – common feature of karst areas.
- Sinkholes – collapse features that often form cave entrances.
  - Cenotes – sinkholes resulting when a collapse of limestone bedrock exposes groundwater.
  - Ponor – natural opening where surface water enters underground passages, similar to sinkhole.
  - Suffusion – geological processes by which subsidence sinkholes or dolines are formed.

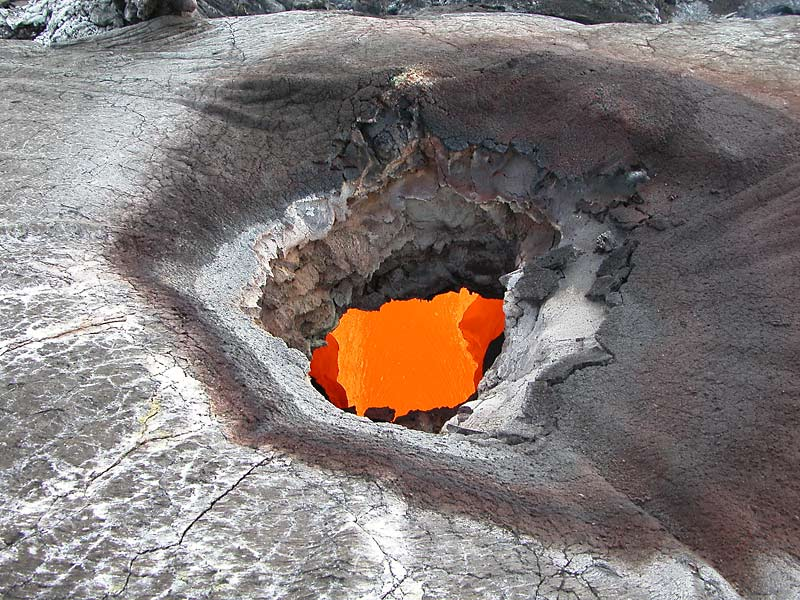
View into a forming lava tube

==== Volcanic surface features ====
- Lava field – large and flat area covered in lava, common site of lava tubes.
- Skylight (geologic phenomona) – break in a lava tube roof, often serves as an access point.

==== Other surface features ====
- Blowhole (geology) – hole in the roof of a sea cave that ejects water under wave pressure.

=== Subterranean features ===
==== Karst ====
- Subterranean lake – lakes below ground.
- Subterranean rivers – river or watercourse that runs wholly or partly beneath the ground, often within caves.
- Subterranean waterfall – underground waterfall.
- Sump (cave) – passage in a cave that is submerged under water.

==== Volcanic ====
- Cupola (cave formation) – recess, indentation, or cavity in the ceiling of a lava tube.
- Lava pillars – common feature in lava tubes and volcanic fields.

== Cave formations ==
Cave formations can take on two major forms, speleothems and speleogens. Speleothems are deposits of minerals that form after the initial cave passage is formed, and are often composed of calcite or other types of calcium carbonate. Speleogens are exposed structures that have been eroded out of the rock, or patterns cut into the rock by the formation of the cave.

=== Speleothems ===
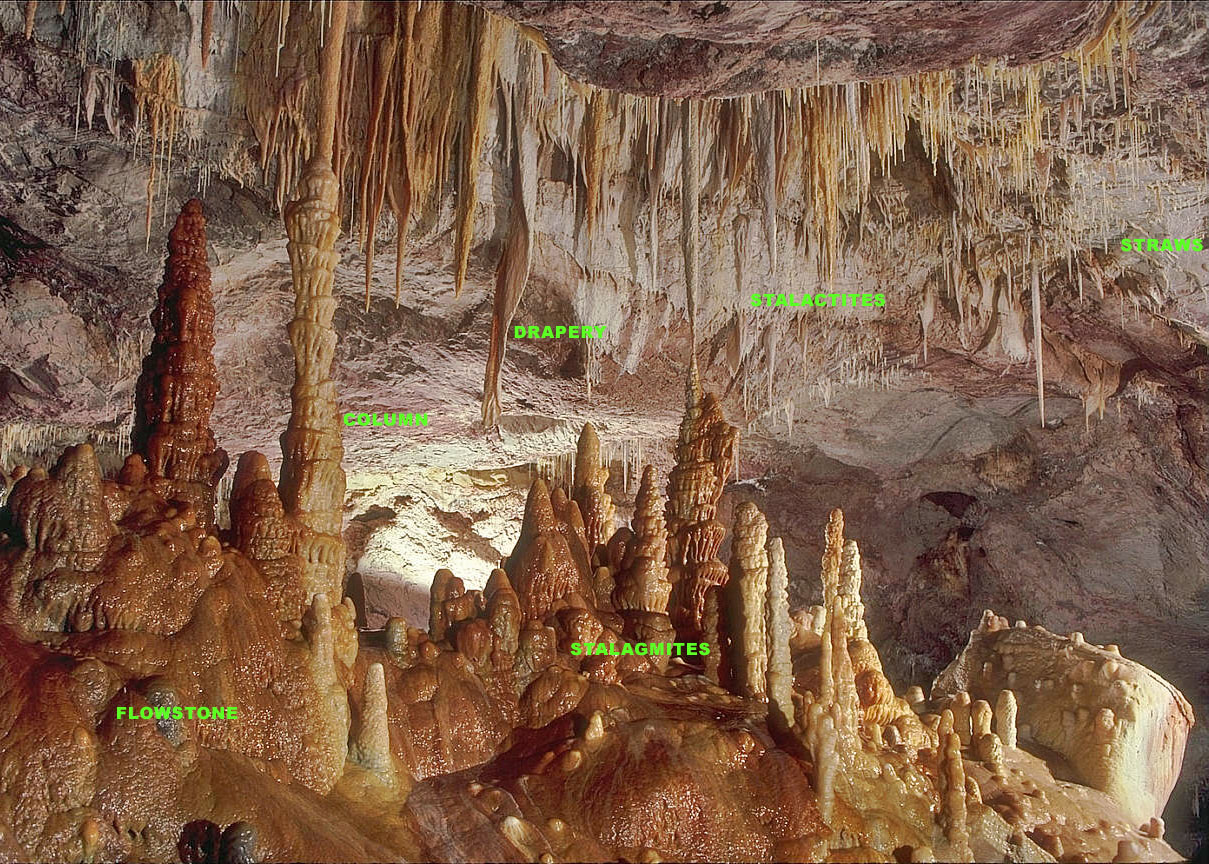
Cave labeled with the six most common types of speleothems: flowstone, columns, drapery, stalagmites, stalactites and straws

- Calcite rafts – thin accumulations of calcite that appear on the surface of cave pools.
- Cave pearls – near-perfect spheres of calcium carbonate.
- Cave popcorn – small knobby clusters of calcite.
- Flowstone – sheet-like rock formation found in large mounds.
- Frostwork – needle-like growths of calcite or aragonite.
- Hells Bells – rare submerged bell-like shapes found in underwater caves.
- Moonmilk – white and cheese-like crystal mush.
- Rimstone – stone barriers that may contain water.
- Shelfstone – shelf like cave formation.
- Stalactites – pointed growths of calcium carbonate that hang from the cave ceiling.
  - Soda straws – long but thin stalagmites.
  - Helictite – stalactites that have twig-like or spiral projections that appear to defy gravity.
- Stalagmites – vertical growths of calcium carbonate, often form under a stalactite.

=== Speleogens ===
- Boxwork – honeycomb-like structures that are eroded out of cave walls.
- Scallops – scoop-like indents in cave walls created by moving water.

== Human use of caves ==
The archeological record shows that humans have used caves for various purposes for hundreds of thousands of years. They have served as homes, refuges, and religious sites for many cultures across the world. Because of this, they have had tremendous impacts on the understanding of humanity's past. Today, caves are one of the few incompletely explored parts of the Earth, and offer unique challenges to both cavers and speleologists.

=== Non-caving uses ===
Caves have been used as religious sites, and often hold spiritual significance. While this makes up a significant amount of non-caving use, show caves are also popular.

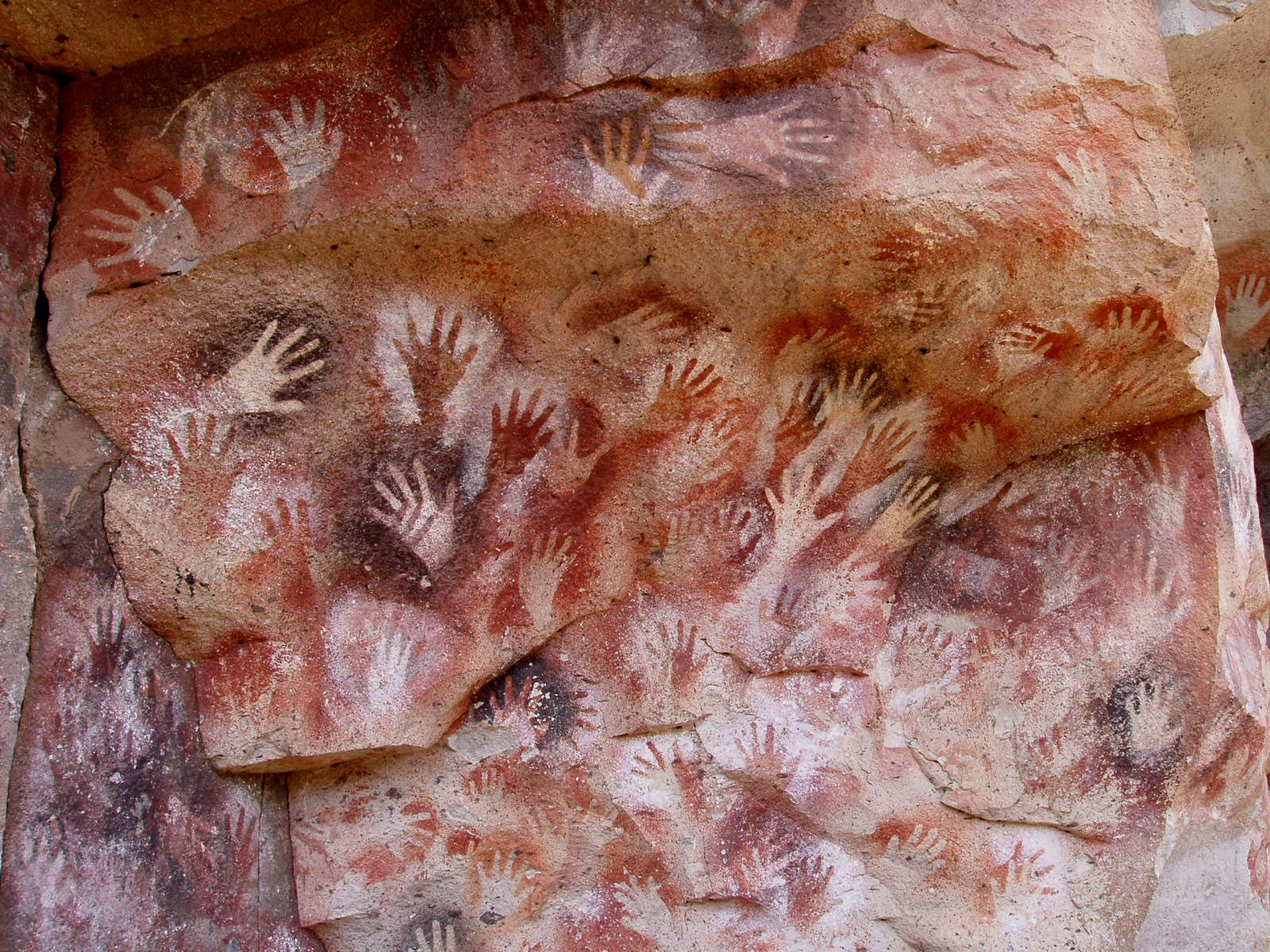
Hands at the Cuevas de las Manos upon Río Pinturas, near the town of Perito Moreno in Santa Cruz Province, Argentina.

- Burial caves – caves used as burial places.
- Cave dwellers – humans who live inside of caves.
- Cave painting – painting within a cave.
- Cave conservation – the protection of caves and cave resources.
- Show caves – cave opened to the public.

=== Caving related uses ===
Caving, also known as spelunking or potholing, is the recreational pastime of exploring wild cave systems. It is distinguished from speleology by lack of scientific intent, with a greater emphasis being placed on sightseeing and enjoyment.

==== Caving ====
- Cave digging – digging open new caves.
- Cave diving – exploration of underwater caves.
- Caving equipment – equipment used by cavers.
- Caving organizations – organizations that promote caving, cave conservation, and cave science.
  - International Union of Speleology – scientific organization dedicated to the international promotion and coordination of cave and karst research.
  - French Federation of Speleology – organization that represents cavers and canyoneering.
  - New Zealand Speleological Society – national organization for recreational cavers in New Zealand.
  - British Caving Association – governing body for caving in the United Kingdom.
  - National Speleological Society – organization for exploration, conservation, and study of caves in the United States.
- Cave rescue – specialized form of wilderness rescue for use in caves.
  - Cave rescue organizations – organizations that provide cave rescue services
  - Irish Cave Rescue Organization – voluntary body responsible for cave and abandoned mine rescues within the island of Ireland.
  - Cave Rescue Organization – the first cave rescue agency in the world.
  - British Cave Rescue Council – coordinating body for several cave rescue organizations in the British Isles.
  - Vertical caving – caving involving ropes and significant vertical exposure.
- Cave survey – process of mapping caves.
- Single-rope technique – the preferred rappel and climbing technique for caving.

==== Notable cavers ====
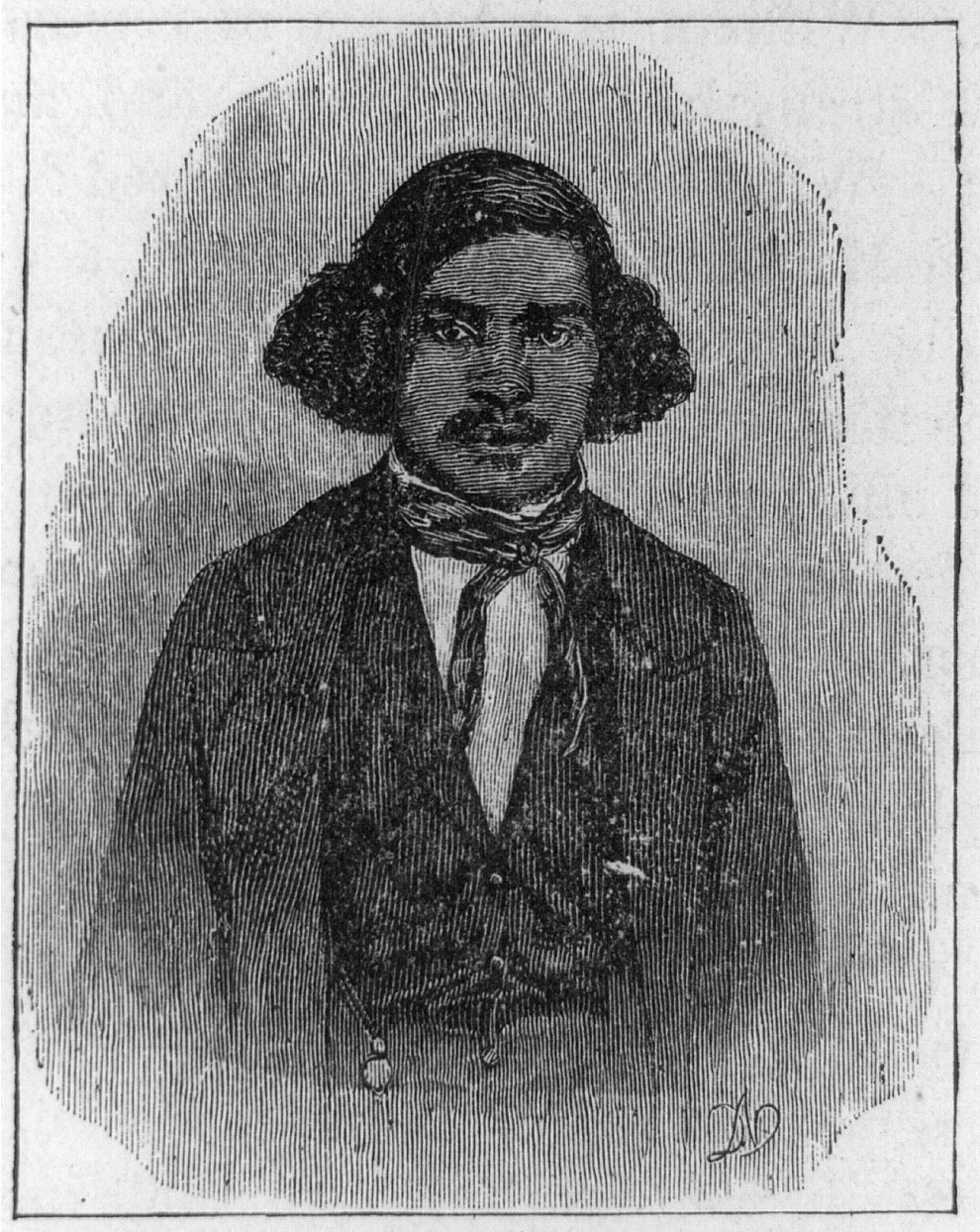
Stephen Bishop

This is an incomplete list of well known cavers, both historical and modern.

- Edd Sorenson – cave diver known for numerous rescues of lost or trapped divers.
- Édouard-Alfred Martel – considered the father of modern speleology.
- Fernand Petzl – founder of equipment brand Petzl.
- Floyd Collins – American cave explorer who became trapped and died near what is now Mammoth Cave National Park.
- Hazel Barton – cave microbiologist and explorer.
- Pierre Chevalier – pioneering caver in France.
- Rick Stanton – influential cave rescue diver.
- Sheck Exley – pioneering cave diver.
- Stephen Bishop – enslaved man who drew the first known map of Mammoth Cave from memory.

==== Caving incidents ====
Although caving is a fairly safe activity compared to other activities that are sometimes classified as "extreme sports", accidents do occur. These tend to be related to flooding, hypothermia, rock falls, falls, single rope technique accidents, or some combination of these. This is an incomplete collection of high-profile caving incidents.

- Alpazat cave rescue – occurred in March 2004 after six British soldiers became trapped in the Alpazat caverns in Mexico.
- Mossdale Caverns incident – incident in 1967 in which six cavers died after a rapid flood.
- Nutty Putty Cave incident – John Edward Jones became stuck and died after he entered a narrow passage head first and became stuck.
- Riesending Cave rescue – one of the largest rescues in history, occurred at Riesending Cave after a caver experienced a traumatic brain injury.
- Tham Luang cave rescue – a youth soccer team was trapped within Tham Luang Nang Non after rising water cut off the exit.

== Speleology ==
Speleology is the scientific study of caves and their formation.

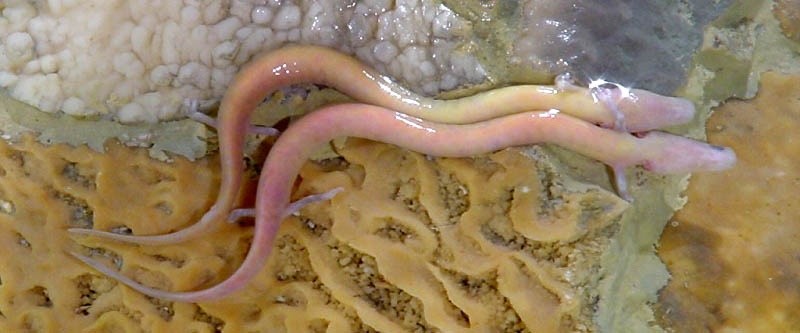
Two olms (Proteus anguinus), in Postojna Cave, Slovenia.

- Biospeleology – the study of cave biology.
- Subterranean fauna – animal species that are adapted to live in an underground environment.
- Speleogenesis – the ways in which caves form.
  - Stygofauna – animals that live in caves under the waterline.
  - Troglofauna – animals that live in caves above the waterline.
    - Troglobites – obligatory cave dwellers, specialized for cave life.
    - Troglophiles – can live part or all of their lives in caves, but can also complete a life cycle in appropriate environments on the surface.
    - Trogloxenes – frequents caves, and may require caves for a portion of its life cycle, but must return to the surface.
    - Troglomorphism – the adaptations that allow the existence of troglofauna.

== Notable caves and cave rooms ==
These caves are the longest, biggest, and deepest known as of 2025.

=== Caves ===
- Hang Sơn Đoòng – largest known cave by volume and contains the largest known cave passage.
- Kazumura Cave – longest and deepest surveyed lava tube.
- Mammoth Cave – greatest total length of surveyed passage.
- Sistema Ox Bel Ha – longest underwater cave and second longest surveyed cave.
- Veryovkina Cave – deepest known cave, at 2,204 meters.
- Vrtoglavica Cave – deepest known pitch.

=== Cave rooms ===
- Miao Room – world's largest known room by volume, at 10,780,000 cubic meters.
- Sarawak Chamber – largest known room by surface area, at 154,500 square meters.

== Cave related media ==
Media related to caves and caving.

- Ben's Vortex – 2012 documentary about the disappearance of Ben McDaniel, a cave diver who disappeared at Vortex Spring.
- Cave of Forgotten Dreams – 2010 3D documentary film by Werner Herzog about the Chauvet Cave in France.
- Diving into the Unknown – 2016 Finnish documentary film directed by Juan Reina about the Pluragrotta cave diving disaster.
- The Cave – 2019 Thai film about the Tham Luang cave rescue.
- The Descent – 2005 British horror film following six women who enter an uncharted cave system.
- The Underground Eiger - 1979 documentary detailing a world record-breaking cave dive.
