= Speleology =

Science of cave and karst systems

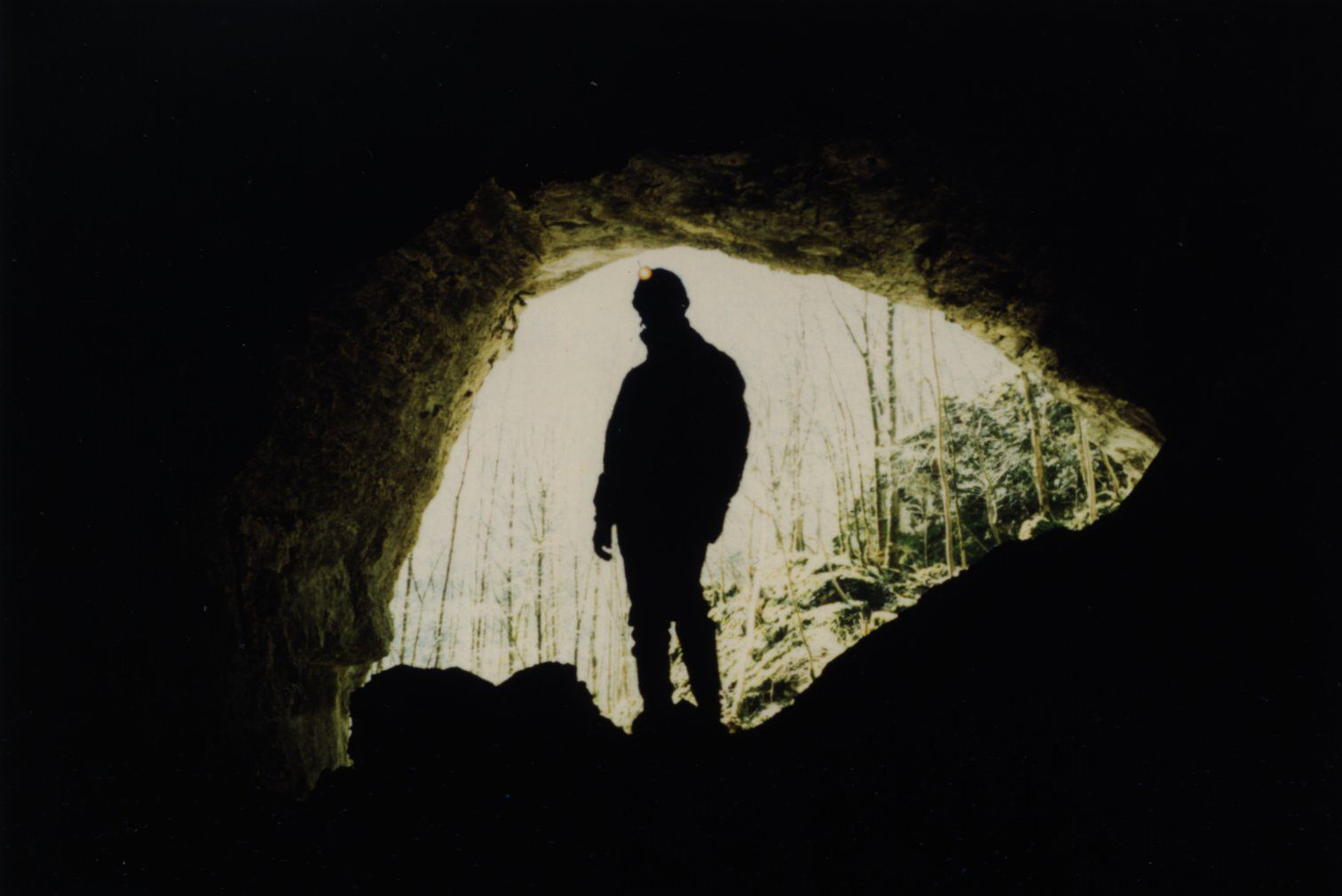
Grotte des Faux-Monnayeurs, Mouthiers-Haute-Pierre (France)

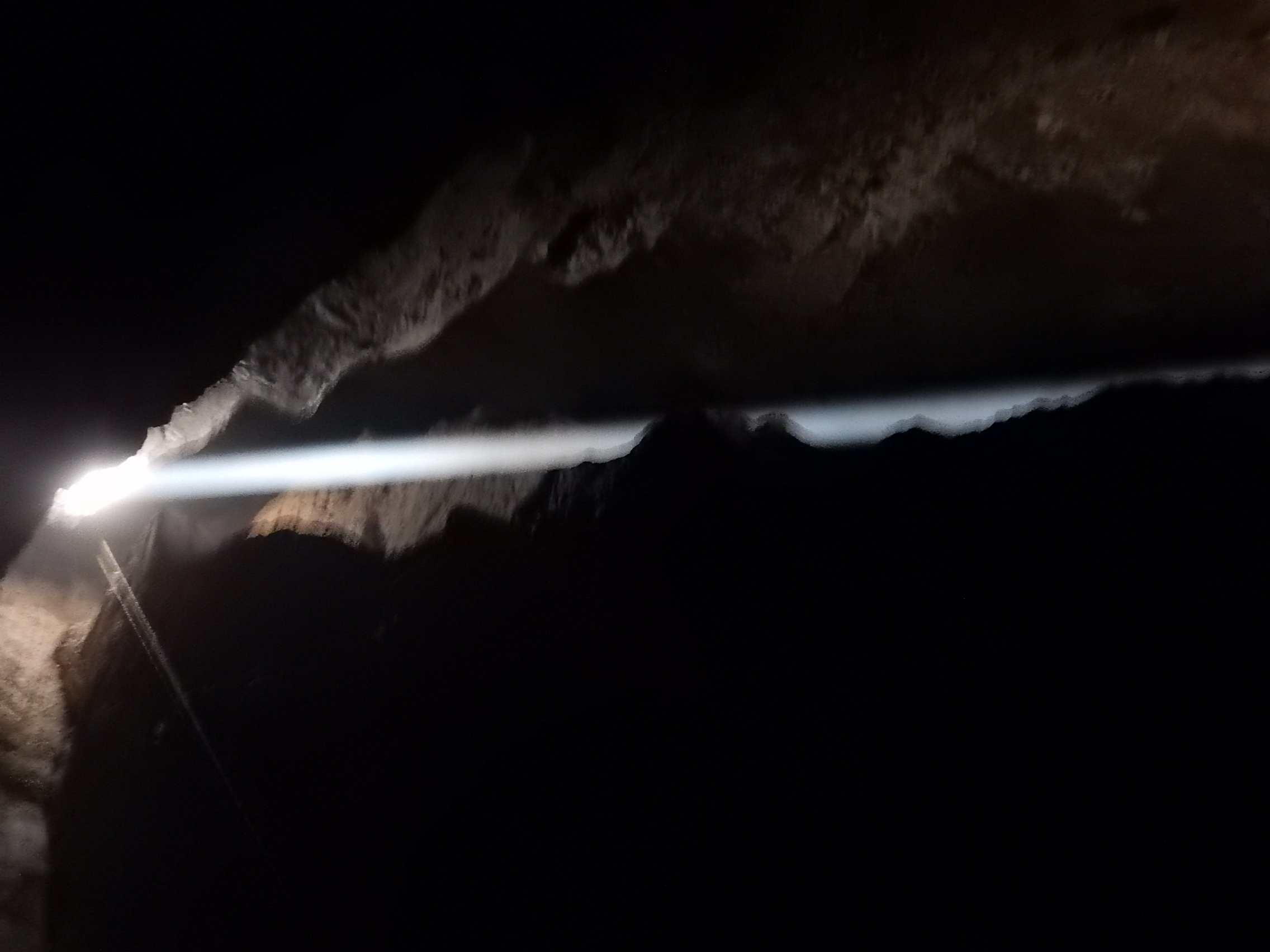
Beam of sun inside the cavity of Rocca ill'Abissu, Fondachelli Fantina, Sicily

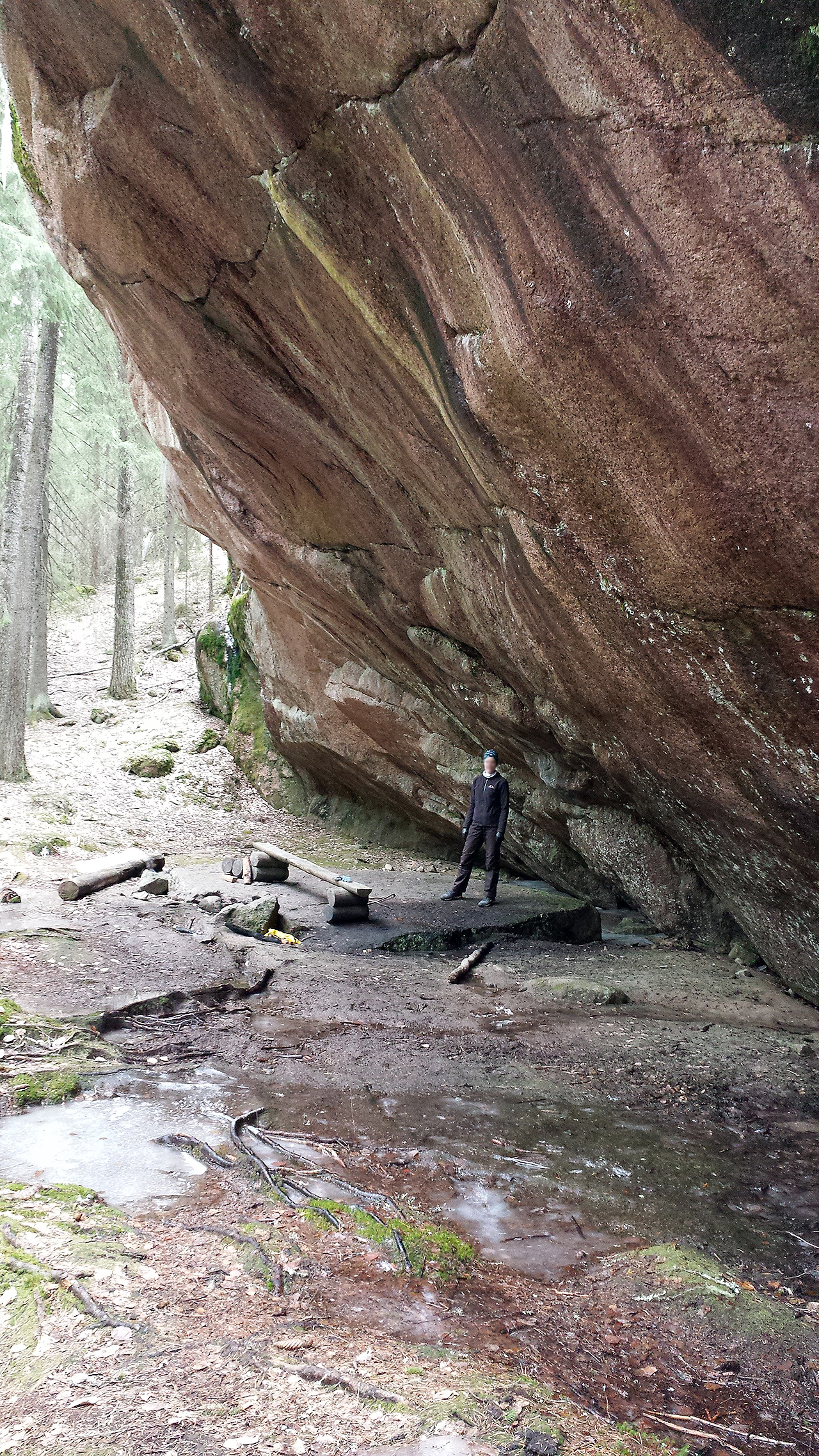
Pirunkirkko (literally "devil's church") of Paistjärvi, a peak cave in Heinola, Päijät-Häme, Finland

Speleology (from Ancient Greek σπήλαιον (spḗlaion) 'cave' and -λογία (-logía) 'study of') is the scientific study of caves and other karst features, as well as their composition, structure, physical properties, history, ecology, and the processes by which they form (speleogenesis) and change over time (speleomorphology). The term speleology is also sometimes applied to the recreational activity of exploring caves, but this is more properly known as caving, potholing (British English), or spelunking (United States and Canadian English). Speleology and caving are often connected, as the physical skills required for in situ study are the same.

Speleology is a cross-disciplinary field that combines the knowledge of chemistry, biology, geology, physics, meteorology, and cartography to develop portraits of caves as complex, evolving systems.

== History ==
Before modern speleology developed, John Beaumont wrote detailed descriptions of some Mendip caves in the 1680s. The term speleology was coined by Émile Rivière in 1890.

Prior to the mid-nineteenth century the scientific value of caves was considered only in its contribution to other branches of science, and cave studies were considered part of the larger disciplines of geography, geology or archaeology. Very little cave-specific study was undertaken prior to the work of Édouard-Alfred Martel (1859–1938), the 'father of modern speleology', who through his extensive and well-publicised cave explorations introduced in France the concept of speleology as a distinct area of study. In 1895 Martel founded the Société de Spéléologie, the first organization devoted to cave science in the world. Other early speleologists include Herbert E. Balch.

An international speleological congress was proposed at a meeting in Valence-sur-Rhone, France, in 1949 and first held in 1953 in Paris. The International Union of Speleology (UIS) was founded in 1965.

The growth of speleology is directly linked with that of the sport of caving, both because of the stimulation of public interest and awareness, and the fact that most speleological field-work has been conducted by sport cavers.

== Cave geology, hydrogeology and biology ==
Karst is a landscape that has limestone underneath which has been eroded. Caves are usually formed through chemical corrosion via a process of dissolution. Corrosion has several ways of doing this, it can be on carbonate rocks through chemical reactions, in gypsum and rock salt it can happen physically, and in silicate rocks and warm climate the decomposition of the materials can happen as well.

=== Geochemistry ===
==== Speleothems ====
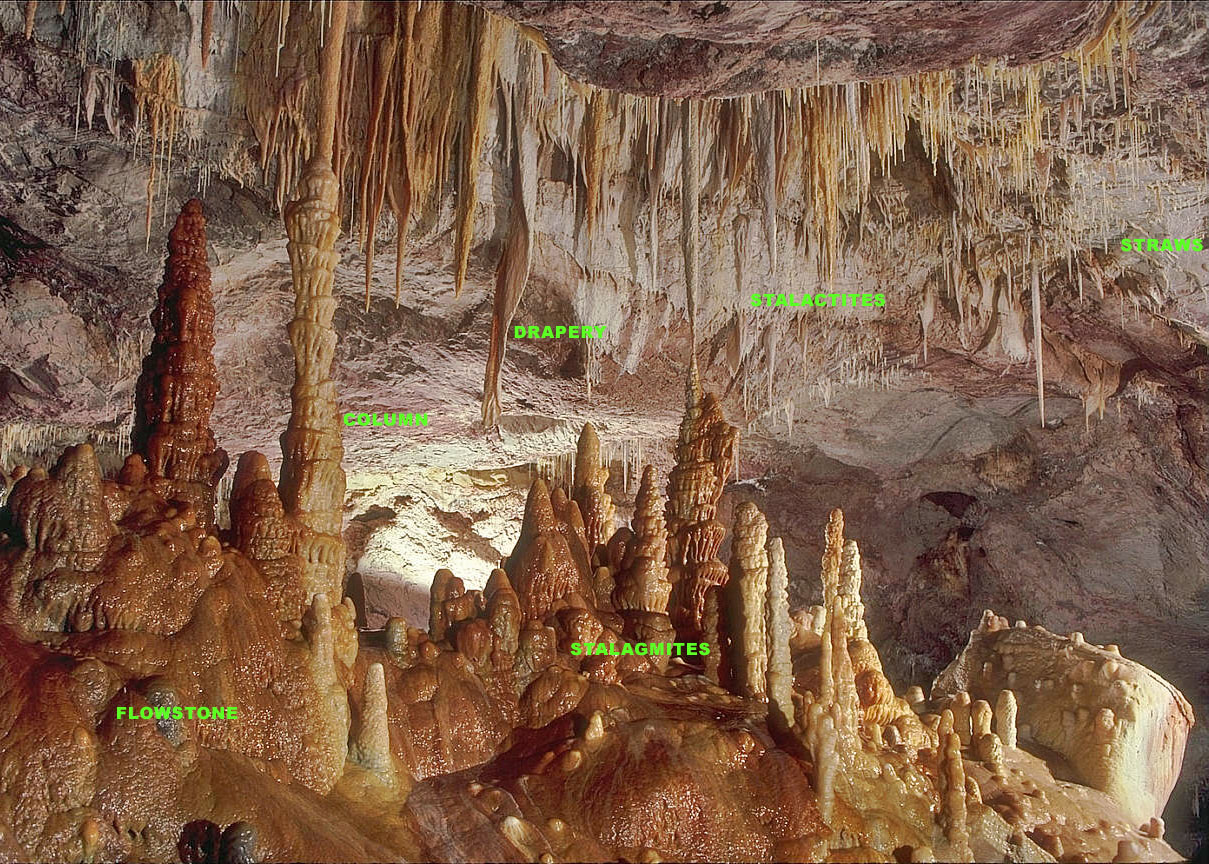
Cave labeled with the six most common types of speleothems: flowstone, columns, drapery, stalagmites, stalactites and straws

A speleothem is a geological formation formed by mineral deposits that accumulate over time in natural caves. Speleothems most commonly form in calcareous caves due to carbonate dissolution reactions. They can take a variety of forms, depending on their depositional history and environment. Their chemical composition, gradual growth, and preservation in caves make them useful paleoclimatic proxies.

=== Biochemistry ===
Caves have an absence of stable temperature, high relative humidity, low rates of evaporation and a limited supply of organic material, which help in creating an environment which is highly favorable for the growth of microbes. Microbial assemblages in caves include archaea, bacteria, fungi and other micro-eukaryotes, these highly adapted microbial communities represent the living-backbone of cave ecosystems and play a key role in shaping structures and sustaining trophic networks.

== Cave cartography ==
The creation of an accurate, detailed map is one of the most common technical activities undertaken within a cave. Cave maps, called surveys, can be used to compare caves to each other by length, depth and volume, may reveal clues on speleogenesis, provide a spatial reference for further scientific study, and assist visitors with route-finding.

== Cave biology ==
Caves provide a home for many unique biota. Cave ecologies are very diverse, and not sharply distinct from surface habitats. Generally however, the deeper the cave becomes, the more rarefied the ecology.

Cave environments fall into three general categories:

- Endogean

the parts of caves that are in communication with surface soils through cracks and rock seams, groundwater seepage, and root protrusion.

- Parahypogean

the threshold regions near cave mouths that extend to the last penetration of sunlight.

- Hypogean

or "true" cave environments. These can be in regular contact with the surface via wind and underground rivers, or the migration of animals, or can be almost entirely isolated. Deep hypogean environments can host autonomous ecologies whose primary source of energy is not sunlight, but chemical energy liberated from limestone and other minerals by chemoautotrophic bacteria.

Cave organisms fall into three basic classes:

Cave organisms
Latin	English	Definition
Troglobites	cave dwellers	are obligatory cavernicoles, specialized for cave life. Some can leave caves for short periods, and may complete parts of their life cycles above ground, but cannot live their entire lives outside of a cave environment. Examples include chemotrophic bacteria, some species of flatworms, glowworms, collembola, and blindfish.
Troglophiles	cave lovers	can live part or all of their lives in caves, but can also complete a life cycle in appropriate environments on the surface. Examples include cave crickets, bats, millipedes, pseudoscorpions, and spiders.
Trogloxenes	cave guests	frequents caves, and may require caves for a portion of its life cycle, but must return to the surface (or a parahypogean zone) for at least some portion of its life. Hibernating reptiles and mammals are the most widely recognized examples.

There are also so-called accidental trogloxenes which are surface organisms that enter caves for no survival reason. Some may even be troglophobes (“cave haters”), which cannot survive in caves for any extended period. Examples include deer which fell through a sinkhole, frogs swept into a cave by a flash flood, etc.

The two factors that limit cave ecologies are generally energy and nutrients. To some degree moisture is always available in actively forming Karst caves. Cut off from the sunlight and steady deposition of plant detritus, caves are poor habitats in comparison with wet areas on the surface. Most of the energy in cave environments comes from the surplus of the ecosystems outside. One major source of energy and nutrients in caves is dung from trogloxenes, most of which is deposited by bats. Other sources are mentioned above.

Cave ecosystems are very fragile. Because of their rarity and position in the ecosystem they are threatened by a large number of human activities. Dam construction, limestone quarrying, water pollution and logging are just some of the disasters that can devastate or destroy underground biological communities.

== Other areas of cave science ==
Speleologists also work with archaeologists in studying underground ruins, tunnels, sewers and aqueducts, such as the various inlets and outlets of the Cloaca Maxima in Rome.

== See also ==
- Cave diving – Diving in water-filled caves
- Caving – Recreational pastime of exploring cave systems
- List of caves
- List of deepest caves
- List of longest caves
- Outline of caves – Overview of and topical guide to caves
