= Shelfstone =

Shelf-like speleothem

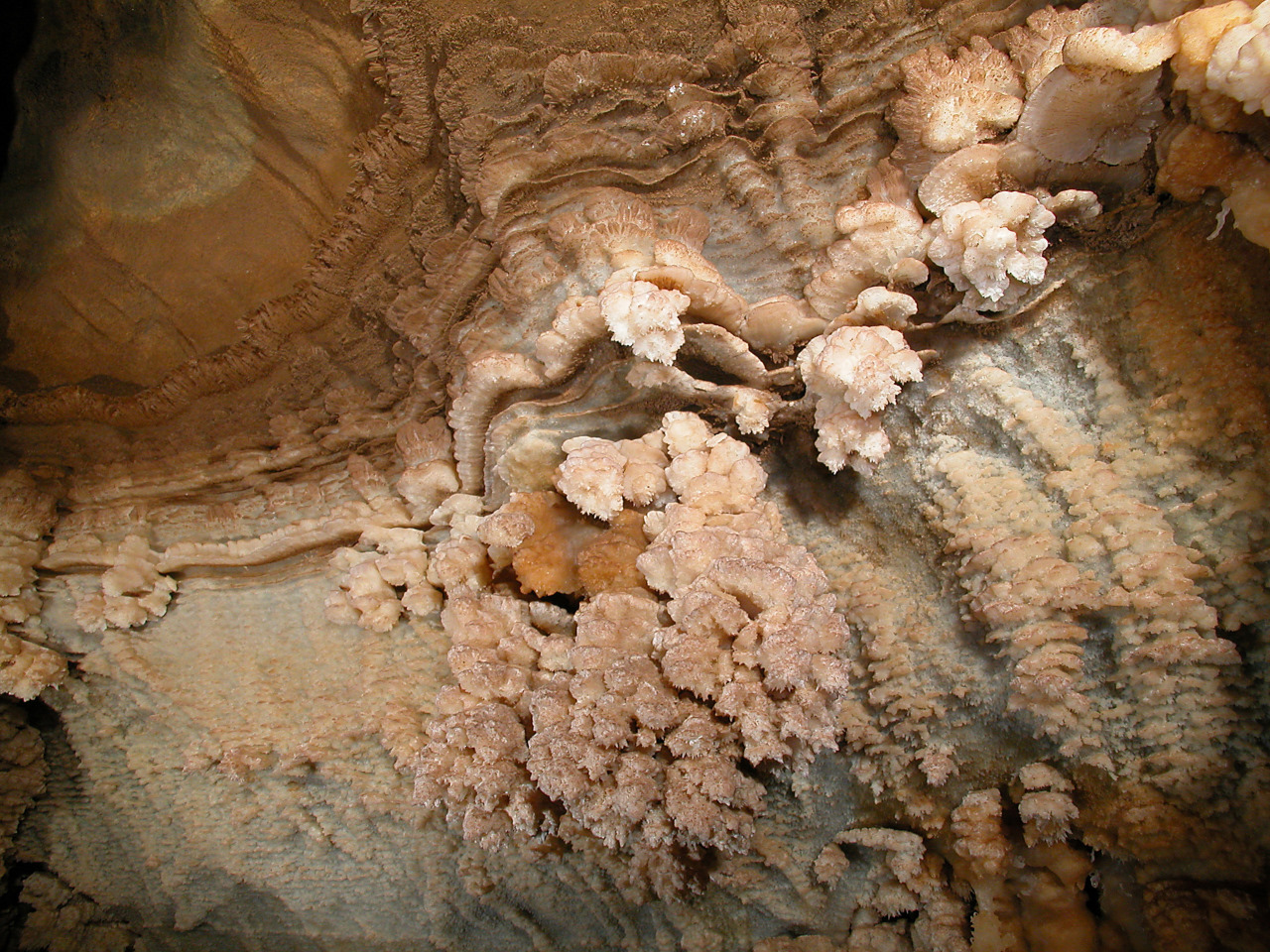
Shelfstone growths at multiple levels show former stands of the pool in which they formed. Some of the lower shelfstone has pool spar attached to it.

Shelfstone is a type of speleothem that grows inwards from the edge of a cave pool. It takes the form of ledges that tend to be flat on top and sloping underneath. They are almost always formed from calcite, when materials precipitated from dripping water onto a cave pool attach to the side. The deposition continues to grow laterally, underneath. The shelfstone above the current water level in a pool is an indicator of past levels of the pool. Shelfstone can be very thick when the water level has stayed constant over a long period of time. If the water level is constantly changing, the shelfstone will be thin and delicate.

== Gallery ==
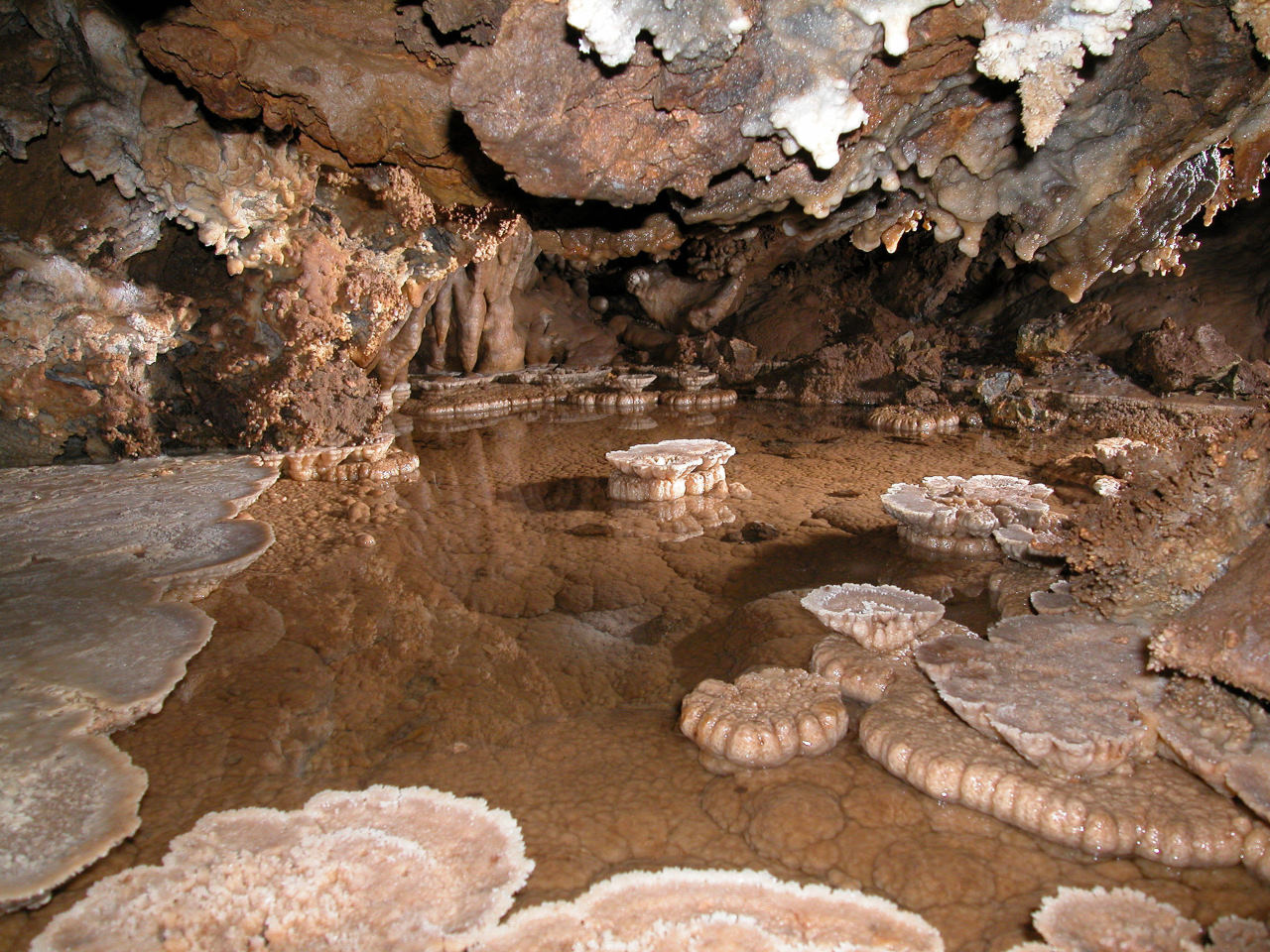
Shelfstone growing on the edge of a small cave pool

Diagram of dripstone cave structures (shelfstones labelled S)
