= Skylight (geologic phenomona) =

Opening to the surface from a lava tube

A skylight is an opening to the surface from a lava tube. They form when the ceiling of a tube collapses. They form during many Hawaiian eruptions.
