= Miao Room =

Largest known cave chamber by volume

Coordinates: 25°24′0″N 105°54′0″E

A schematic representation of the Miao Room within the Gebihe cave system

Miao Room is the largest known cave chamber by volume in the world. It is a part of the Gebihe cave system, which is located in Ziyun Getu He National Park in Ziyun county of the Chinese province of Guizhou. The chamber, discovered by a French expedition called Gebihe'89 in 1989, measures 852 metres (2,795 ft) in length, 191 metres (627 ft) in width, has an area of 154,500 square metres (1,663,000 sq ft), and a volume of 10,780,000 cubic metres (381,000,000 cu ft). In 2013, members of a British led expedition measured the chamber using 3-D laser scanners.

== Geology and formation ==
For more than 600 million years, the area in which the Gebihe cave system is located was covered by sea, and during this time it accumulated miles-thick layers of sediments, including limestone. The uplift of the area and then the erosion of the limestone layer created today's massive cavern system.

The system spreads out in limestones and dolomite of Carboniferous and Permian age. Old cave levels have been cut by erosion and follow the base level lowering caused by Tertiary uplift.

== See also ==
- South China Karst
- Sarawak Chamber
