= Soda straw =

Mineral tube formation found in caves

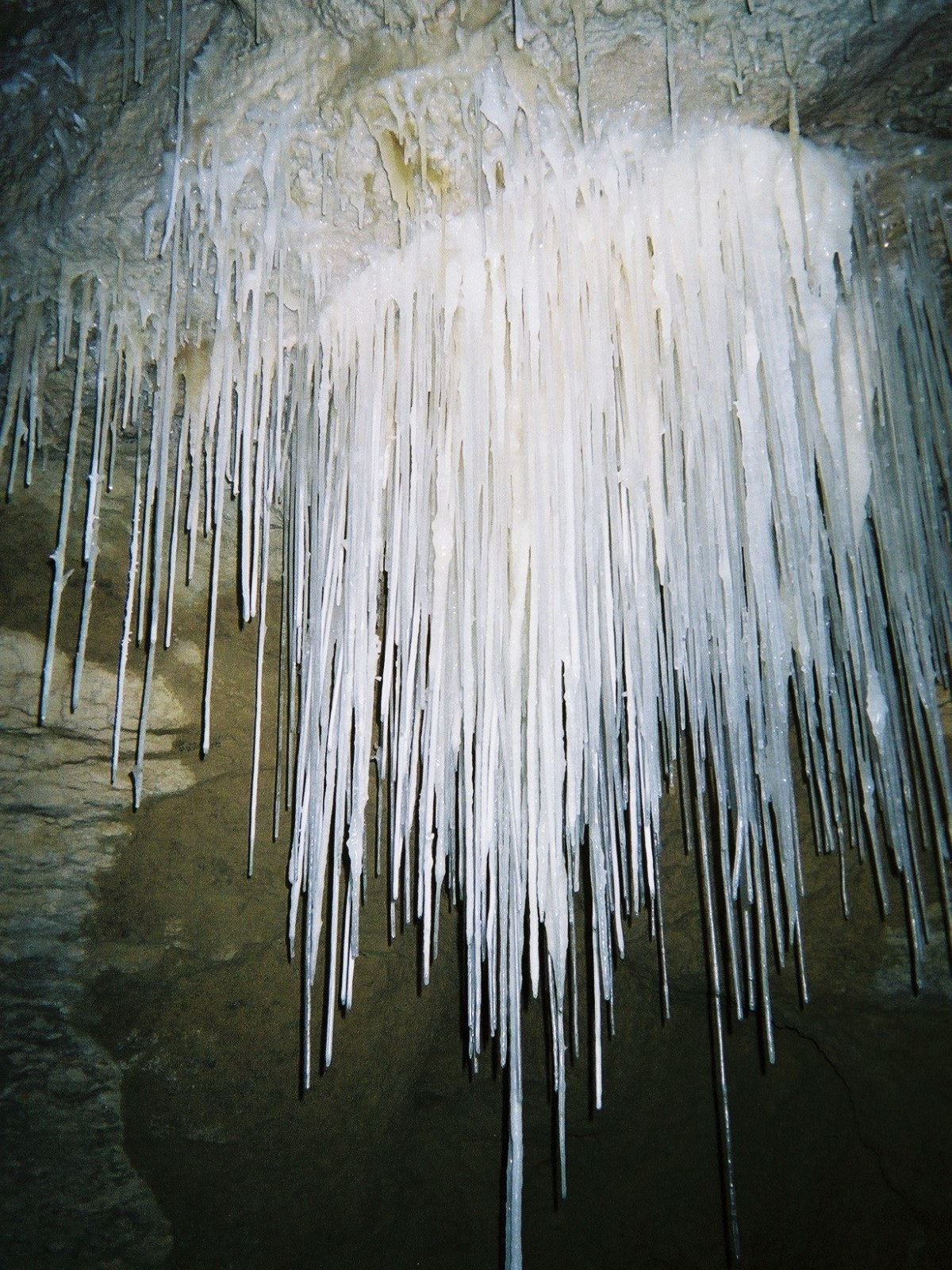
Straws (stalactite precursors) in Gardner's Gut cave in New Zealand

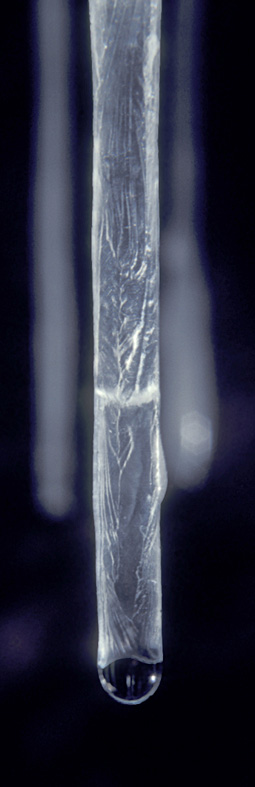
A soda straw

A soda straw (or simply straw) is a speleothem in the form of a hollow mineral cylindrical tube. They are also known as tubular stalactites. Soda straws grow in places where water leaches slowly through cracks in rock, such as on the roofs of caves. Soda straws in caves rarely grow more than a few millimetres per year and may average one tenth of a millimetre per year. A soda straw can turn into a stalactite if the hole at the bottom is blocked, or if the water begins flowing on the outside surface of the hollow tube. Soda straws can also form outside the cave environment on exposed concrete surfaces as a type of calthemite, growing significantly faster than those formed on rock.

== Formation ==
These tubes form when calcium carbonate or calcium sulfate dissolved in the water comes out of solution and is deposited. In soda straws, as each drop hovers at the tip, it deposits a ring of mineral at its edge. It then falls and a new drop takes its place. Each successive drop of water deposits a little more mineral before falling, and eventually a tube is built up. Stalagmites or flowstone may form where the water drops hit the cave floor.

Soda straws are some of the most fragile of speleothems. Like helictites, they can be easily crushed or broken by the slightest touch. Because of this, soda straws are rarely seen within arm's reach in show caves or others with unrestricted access. Kartchner Caverns in southern Arizona has well-preserved soda straws because of its recent discovery in 1974 and highly regulated traffic.

== Outside the cave environment ==
Straws can also form beneath man-made structures and grow significantly faster than in the natural cave environment. These forms are classified as calthemites as opposed to the speleothems growing in natural environments. Their chemistry differs from those found in caves because they are derived from concrete, lime, mortar or other calcareous material. Calthemite soda straws have been recorded as growing up to 2 mm (0.079 in) per day in length, which is hundreds of times faster than speleothem soda straw growth rates typically averaging 2 mm or less per year.

Calthemite straws are on average just 40% the mass per unit length of speleothem straws of equivalent external diameter. This is because calthemite straws have a thinner wall thickness and less-dense calcium carbonate structure compared to speleothem straws.

A calthemite straw can vary in outside diameter as it grows in length. Changes in diameter can take a matter of days or weeks and are due to changes in drip rate over time. Slow dripping calthemite straws tend to be slightly larger in diameter than fast-dripping straws. As a comparison, because of the much "slower growth rate of speleothem (cave) straws, there is more chance that fluctuation in drip rate may be averaged out and the straw external diameter remains reasonably constant."

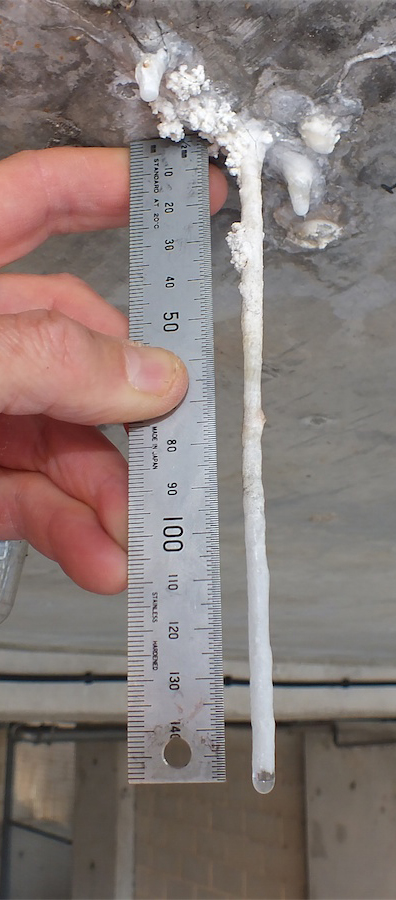
Calthemite soda straw growing from underside of concrete structure

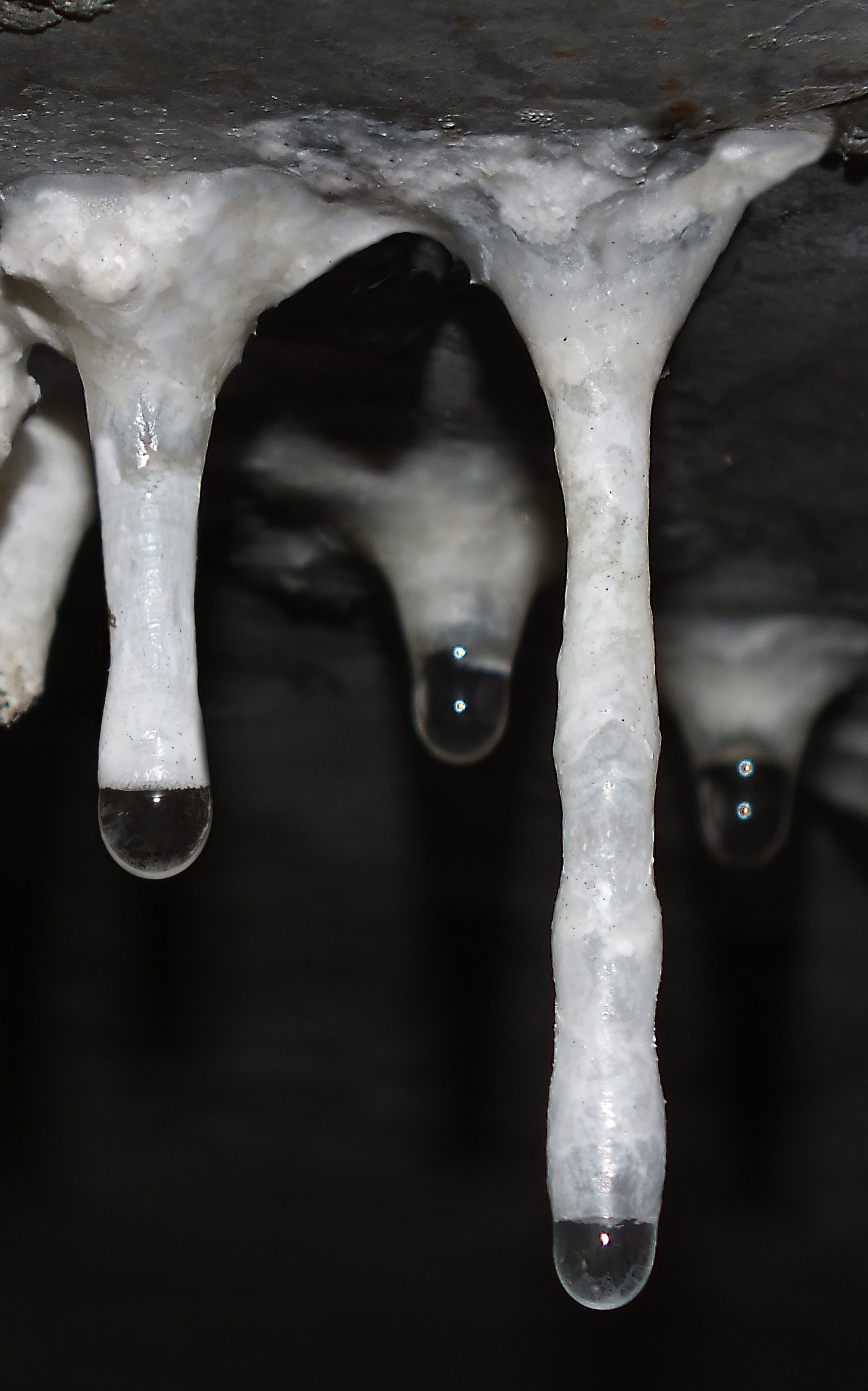
Calthemite straw with varying external diameter, influenced by changes in drip rate over time, during its growth
