= Caving equipment =

Equipment for caving and spelunking

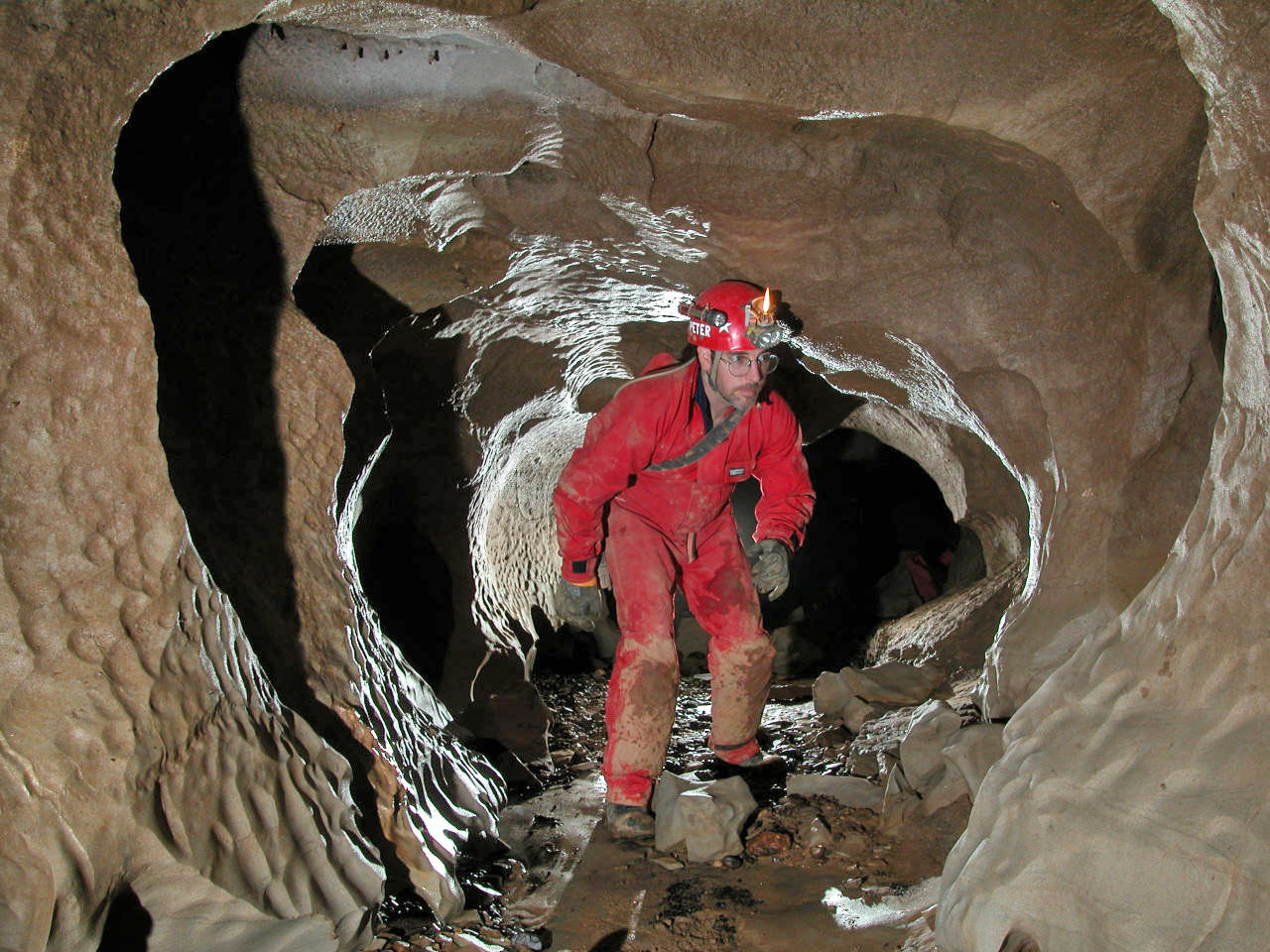
Caver in an Alabama cave showing common caving wear: coveralls, helmet-mounted lights, heavy boots and gloves.

Caving equipment is equipment used by cavers and speleologists to aid and protect them while exploring caves. The term may also be used to refer to equipment used to document caves, such as photographic and surveying equipment. Originally, cave diving equipment was quite limited, but the increasing popularity of caving during the 20th century led to the creation of specialist caving equipment and companies.

Due to the greatly varying conditions of caves throughout the world, there is a multitude of different equipment types and categories. Cavers exploring a largely dry system may wear a fleece one-piece undersuit with a protective oversuit while cavers exploring a very wet cave may opt to use wetsuits. Cavers in large dry systems in the tropics and in desert climates may simply opt to wear shorts and a T-shirt.

== History ==
The earliest cavers in Europe and North America were limited in their explorations by a lack of suitable equipment. Explorers of the early 1800s, when caving began to become more common, caved in tweed suits and used candles for illumination. Exploration was usually limited to drier caves, as there was little to protect cavers from the cold once they became wet. Later, cavers began to adopt miners' lamps, which were designed for underground use and were reasonably reliable, though their light was not especially powerful. Lighting magnesium strips was a popular way of illuminating large chambers. E. A. Martel, a French caver, created a collapsible canvas canoe which he used to explore several caves containing long flooded sections, such as the Marble Arch Cave in Northern Ireland. His expeditionary equipment was described in 1895 as: "a canvas boat, some hundreds of feet of rope-ladders, a light portable folding wooden ladder, ropes, axes, compass, barometer, telephone, map etc." The acetylene lamp—powered by carbide—was one of the main light sources used by cavers during the 20th century. Electric miners' headlamps, powered by lead-acid batteries were later used, eventually superseded by LED lighting, which offers superior duration and brightness and is considerably lighter.

Vertical caving was undertaken with rope ladders. These were cumbersome and unwieldy, especially when wet, and sometimes required teams of donkeys to carry them. The French explorer Robert de Joly pioneered the use of ever lighter rope ladders until developing the Elektron Ladder, a light wire ladder with aluminium rungs. The lightness and portability of these ladders revolutionised the exploration of deep caves, paving the way for the exploration of the Gouffre Berger, the first cave in the world to break the 1 km depth limit. Early systems of ascending ropes were developed by Pierre Chevalier in the Dent de Crolles cave system in France in the late 1930s, Chevalier also being the first to use nylon rope in a cave as opposed to natural fibre rope. Single rope technique (SRT) began to be developed in the US in the 1950s. A similar system was developed in Europe in the late 1960s, which was quickly standardised and is still in use today. SRT offered the advantage of greater speed and versatility in the descent of vertical shafts. (Previously, one caver would have to remain at the head of the final pitch to belay the returning cavers up a ladder climb.)

The increasing popularity of caving during the 1960s and 1970s led to the creation of specialist caving equipment companies, such as Petzl. Previously, cavers adapted equipment from other sources, such as miners' helmets and electric lamps, or made their own equipment. Caving equipment made today conforms to high safety standards, decreasing injuries and fatalities.

== Protective clothing ==
=== Thermal protection ===
Caves in temperate regions such as Europe and North America maintain an average yearly temperature of 11–13 °C (52–55 °F). While this is not especially cold, exposure to water and fatigue can increase the risk of hypothermia. Cavers usually wear a one-piece undersuit made of fleece or fibre pile, sometimes used in tandem with thermal underclothes. In warmer caves, such as those in France and Spain, lighter undersuits are used to prevent overheating.

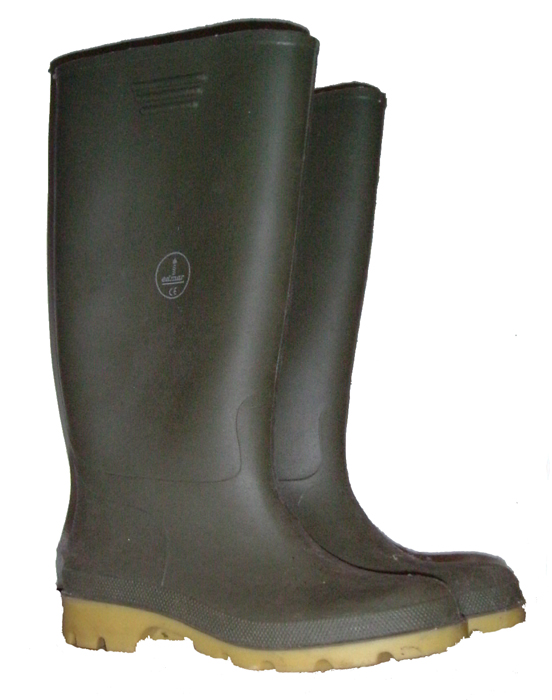
A pair of Wellington boots

When caving in wet caves, neoprene wetsuits provide superior insulation to fleece underclothes. While cavers often use wetsuits designed for surfing or diving, specialist caving wetsuits are available with reinforced elbows and knees. Hybrid fleece wetsuit-undersuits are also used.

=== Abrasive protection ===
Cavers commonly wear protective oversuits, similar to boiler suits but made of heavily abrasion-resistant material such as cordura. In wet or windy caves, PVC oversuits may be preferred, as they provide a greater degree of warmth and protection against getting wet. Oversuits often come with reinforced areas, especially at wear points such as the elbows, seat and shins. Internal pockets and hoods are sometimes provided.

Knee pads and, less commonly, elbow pads are worn both to protect both the caver's body and clothing. Gloves are also worn. In wet caves neoprene gloves can be worn as added protection against the cold.

=== Footwear ===
Wellington boots are a popular choice of footwear, being hard-wearing, cheap, having good grip and great water-resistance. Hiking boots are also worn, providing superior ankle support. They do however let water and grit in much easier and are often damaged by the harsh cave environment. There is also the risk of lace hooks ensnaring on ladders. In large, dry, tropical caves they are superior to Wellington boots, being cooler and restrict movement less. Specialist canyoning boots offer an expensive alternative to Wellingtons and hiking boots.

=== Helmets ===
While helmets are used to protect the caver's head against occasional falling rocks, they find much more use in protecting the cavers' heads from bumps and scrapes while moving through low or awkward passageways. Helmets are invaluable for mounting lights—an array of lights can be attached to a helmet. Many helmets used in caving can also be used as climbing helmets. A standard, inexpensive construction workers helmet is normally considered adequate and usually has a peak which helps to deflect water from the face.

=== Lighting ===
In the earliest days, candles were used, soon replaced by carbide lamps and later by electric Miners lamps. Nowadays LED lamps powered by lithiom ion batteries, self contained on the helmet are the norm. Specialist carbide devices are still used on remote expeditions where electric charging is not available.

=== Belts ===
When miners lamps were the normal method of lighting, a belt was essential to carry the battery pack. They are still normally used both to streamline the torso in narrow passages, but essentially to carry ancillary equipment such as ladders and small tackle bags attached by carabiner. Purpose made belts are normally used which have the strength to be used as a back-up safety attachment.

== Vertical equipment ==
Many caves have shafts or drops that require ropes or ladders to pass. Wire ladders have largely been superseded by ropes for descending Pitch (vertical space) since the early '60s, though ladders still have useful applications on shorter pitches, where full abseiling gear would be inappropriate.

=== Single rope technique ===
The single-rope technique (SRT) is the most commonly used technique for passing vertical obstacles.

==== Standard equipment ====
- Climbing harness - static and more abrasion-resistant than the harnesses used in rock climbing.
- Climbing rope - rope used for abseiling is low-stretch static rope, typically 9 mm-thick in Europe. In the US, SRT rope is thicker (11mm) and more abrasion-resistant, given the greater amount of rope-rub tolerated. Ropes are cut into varying lengths
- Ascender - used to ascend ropes. Devices that used lever cams were once used, though these have now been overtaken in popularity by toothed cam devices which slip less. A minimum of two ascenders are used, one attached to the harness at waist level, and another attached to a foot-loop and moved by hand. A third ascender may be attached to a foot and a rope-walking technique used.
- Descender - used to abseil down the rope. There are two main types of descender – a bobbin descender such as the Petzl Stop, and a rack descender, favoured in parts of the US for its smooth descent and excellent heat-sinking capacities. Bobbin descenders are favoured for European style SRT as they make it easier to change ropes at rebelays and are lighter. A Figure 8 may also be used.
- Cowstails - lanyards used to clip into safe points of contact when changing over at rebelays and while using traverse lines. They are made from a length of dynamic rope with two lanyards of differing length ending in carabiners.
- Knife - used as safety equipment to cut ropes, cut hair caught in descenders etc.
- Whistle - on long pitches where shouting is ineffective, whistles are used to signal other team members.
- Chest roller - helps stabilize barrel-chested or top-heavy users who have a tendency to lean back during vertical caving. The device features a chest plate, which is strapped high on the torso, and a metal roller, which locks around the rope.

=== Ladders ===
Early cavers used rope ladders with timber rungs. These were superseded by wire 'Elektron' ladders at the start of the 1960s and remained the most common method of descending large shafts until around the end of the 1980s. Today they are largely used for descending short or tight pitches. The rungs of the ladders are usually made of aluminium tube because it is light and strong. Ladders are usually made in 5, 8 or 10 m (16, 26 or 33 ft) lengths, and can be clipped together to make longer lengths. While ladders can be used without a belay, this is unsafe and is not recommended. Ladders may be carried coiled, without other protection, until needed, or may be carried inside tough PVC tackle-bags.

=== Rope ===
Dynamic rope, more commonly used in climbing, is used in caving for belaying cavers on climbs or using ladders.

Static rope, once past its useful life for abseiling, is often used for fixed aids, such as handlines on climbs. The rope may be knotted to help climbers. Rope may also be recycled for digging.

=== Bolting ===
Most caves require artificial anchor points to secure SRT rope. A common method of placing bolts is to hand drill them using a hammer and a self-drilling bolt, using bolts adapted from the construction industry. A hanger can then be screwed into the bolt. Since affordable battery drills came on the market it is more common to see cavers drill the holes and use a variety of different bolts and concrete screws. Stainless steel resin bolts are used on routes that see a lot of traffic as they have a long life and, if placed correctly, are safe and reliable.

== Surveying equipment ==
Cave surveying is a specialist activity undertaken within caving to produce maps of caves. The type of equipment used depends on the intended accuracy of the survey. A basic survey may be carried out with an orienteering or diving compass and distances paced by foot or estimated. A more accurate survey would make use of a tape measure and specialist surveying compasses and inclinometers. Recently there has been a shift to wholly digital cave surveying.

=== Measuring instruments ===
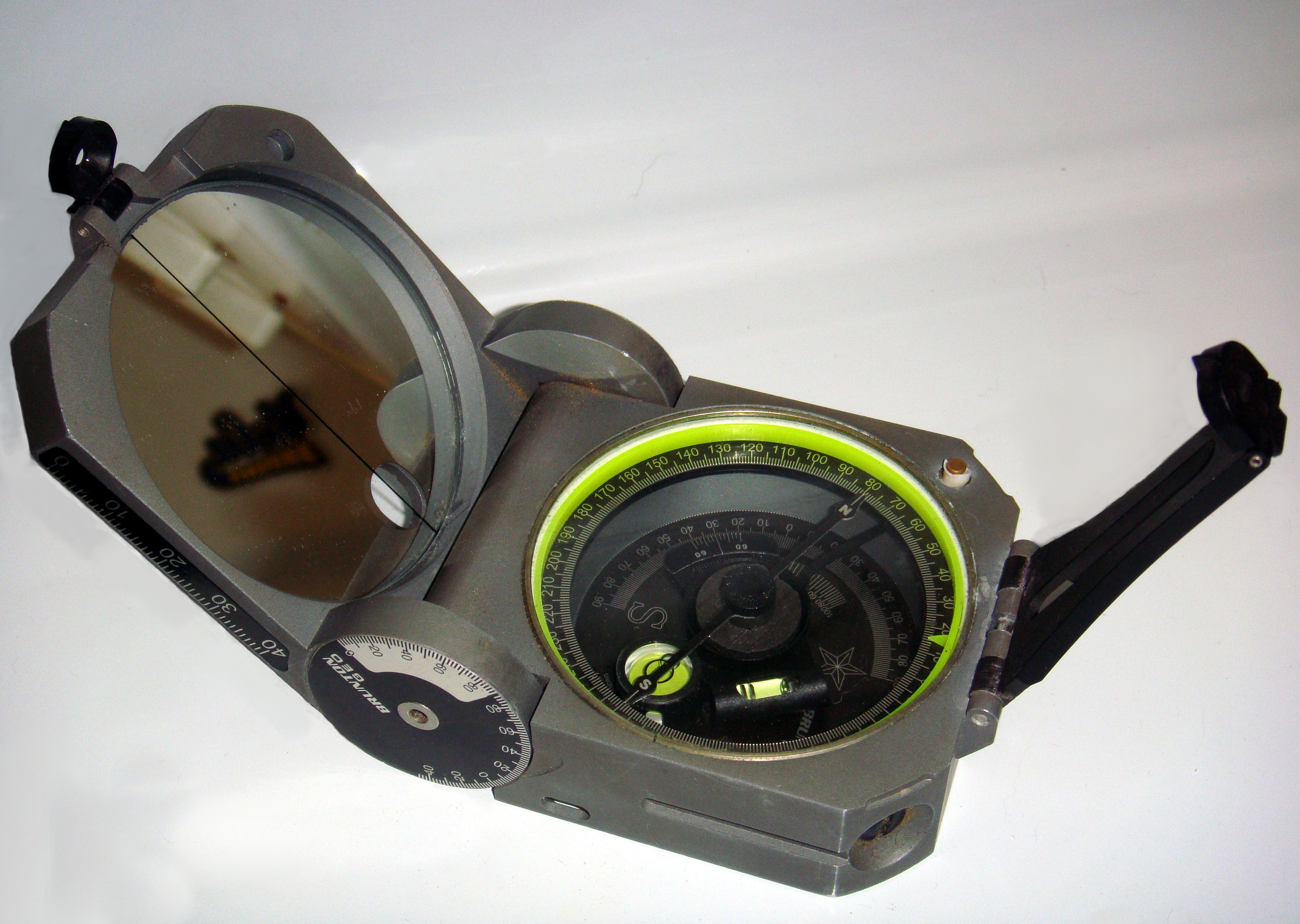
A standard Brunton Geo, a combined compass and inclinometer, popular as a cave surveying compass until recently

The most common device used by cave surveyors is a sighting compass, such as that manufactured by Suunto or Silva, that can be read to the half-degree. Compasses used for cave surveying have to be rugged to cope with the harsh conditions. For high grade surveys, inclinometers are required, and are sometimes made in combined units with compasses. Recently, digital compasses and inclinometers have been developed by enthusiasts, some with wireless connections to PDAs, though these have not yet attained widespread use.

=== Measuring distance ===
A standard fibreglass tape measure is commonly used to measure distance, usually in lengths of 30 to 50 metres (98 to 164 ft). Laser rangefinders have recently gained popularity, though tapes remain preferable in especially wet or muddy conditions.

=== Recording data ===
Tough waterproof paper is used to record data, the advantage being that, if the paper becomes excessively muddy, it can be washed off in a stream or pool. Paperless surveying is now becoming a reality as digital measuring devices can be Wirelessly connected to PDAs where the data is stored and drawn.

== Communication ==
Communication between cavers and people on the surface may be essential for rescues or expeditions. Communication may be as simple as coded whistle blasts, though they are only effective across short distances and cannot be used in underwater caves. Telephones have been used in mines since at least June 1882, while the first record of telephones used in caving is from 1898. Édouard-Alfred Martel and his cousin Gabriel Gaupillat utilized lightweight telephones of 480 g (1.06 lb) with up to 400 m (1,300 ft) of wire to explore deep pitches. However, it is possible that telephones were used in Lamb Leer caverns before February 1885, as there are references to a "talking machine" in use before this time.

Radio communication within caves is problematic because rock is a conductor and therefore absorbs radio waves. Ordinary radios have a very short range within caves. Low frequency (LF) or very low frequency (VLF) radios with single-sideband modulation are more commonly used today. Early models were called "speleophones".

== See also ==
- Rock-climbing equipment
