= Abîme =

Vertical shaft in karst

In geography, an abîme is a vertical shaft in karst terrain that may be very deep and usually opens into a network of subterranean passages. The term is borrowed from French, where it means abyss or chasm.

== Definition ==
=== Formation ===
Abîmes are a structure which form late in the life of a limestone cave. They can be 1–10 metres in diameter and up to 50 metres in height vertically. The walls have grooves that serve as a contrast to the smooth nature of the rest of the cave. They are known to lie under heads of stream valleys, sinkholes, or along non-carbonated rocks. Water will occasionally fall down the shaft, creating subterranean waterfalls. Only a small portion of the abîme connects to the rest of the cavern. They can extend to the present water table, while the rest of the cavern lies above it.

=== Other names ===
Abîme are also known as pit caves in the United States and pot caves in England. They can also be called domepits, due to the way that looking up from below a dome can be seen and looking down from above a pit is seen. Blue holes are sinkholes that have filled with water and can occur on land or at sea. In Central America, they are called cenotes.

== Recreation ==
=== Rappelling (or pit caving) ===
This is the act of using ropes, harnesses and ladders to descend an abîme. This is the most popular activity besides the actual exploration of caves. It is also the most dangerous activity to do in a cave. The biggest danger comes from using poor ropes and ladders for rappelling down shafts. Many amateurs make this mistake and it leads to the most cave deaths.

=== Base cave jumping (Cave of Swallows, Mexico) ===
An extreme sport and requiring a person to stand at the entrance of an abîme and jump into the opening while pulling a parachute before hitting the cave floor. This is highly dangerous and should only be undertaken by those with experience. The Cave of Swallows is the most popular due to its 333 metres (1,093 ft) freefall drop, which is the longest in the Western hemisphere.

== Popular examples ==
- Cave of Swallows, Mexico
- Hellhole (cave), West Virginia
- El Capitan Pit, Prince of Wales Island, Alaska
- Vrtiglavica Cave, Slovenia
- Pozzo del Merro, Italy (Deepest blue hole, 392m)

== Literature ==
- "Cave of Swallows." Wikipedia. Wikimedia Foundation, n.d. Web. 04 Dec. 2015.
- Jennings, J. N., and J. N. Jennings. Karst Geomorphology. Oxford, UK: B. Blackwell, 1985. Print.
- Lübke, Anton. The World of Caves. New York: Coward-McCann, n.d. Print.
- Moore, George William, and G. Nicholas Sullivan. Speleology: Caves and the Cave Environment. St. Louis: Cave, 1997. Print.
- "Pit Cave." Wikipedia. Wikimedia Foundation, n.d. Web. 04 Dec. 2015.
