= Descender (rappelling equipment) =

Device used to descend on a rope

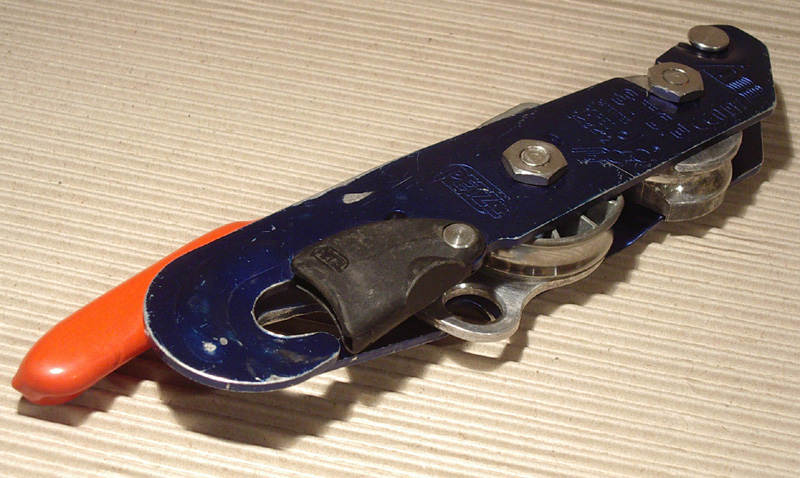
A Petzl Stop descender

Descenders (or rappel devices) enable a user to descend a rope. They take several forms, amongst which are the bobbin, rappel rack, and figure 8. While there are others, these are amongst the most commonly used examples. It is also possible to use many belay devices to rappel, though these have other drawbacks.

== History ==
The first rappel devices were likely simple wraps around some sort of retaining rod or connector. One early device was described by Gerolamo Cardano, and another by Galileo Galilei. These early ideas, along with others developed throughout the next several centuries, were not commercially successful. Starting in the mid 1860s, bobbin style devices similar to the Petzl Simple were used by German fire brigades. In the 1870s, the first devices that were similar to the rappel rack were developed, though they lacked many of the features that define a modern rack, which were added in the late 1960s. The first figure 8 was developed by Dr. Max Pfrimmer in 1943, and commercialized in the 1960s.

In the 1950s, single-rope technique was introduced to the cavers of the United States by Bill Cuddington. During the initial rush of innovation that accompanied this, many rappelling devices came and went. Eventually, the American caving community primarily settled on the use of full-size racks, microracks, and figure 8s.

The European caving community primarily uses bobbins, which favor the Alpine style of rigging more prevalent there.

== Types ==
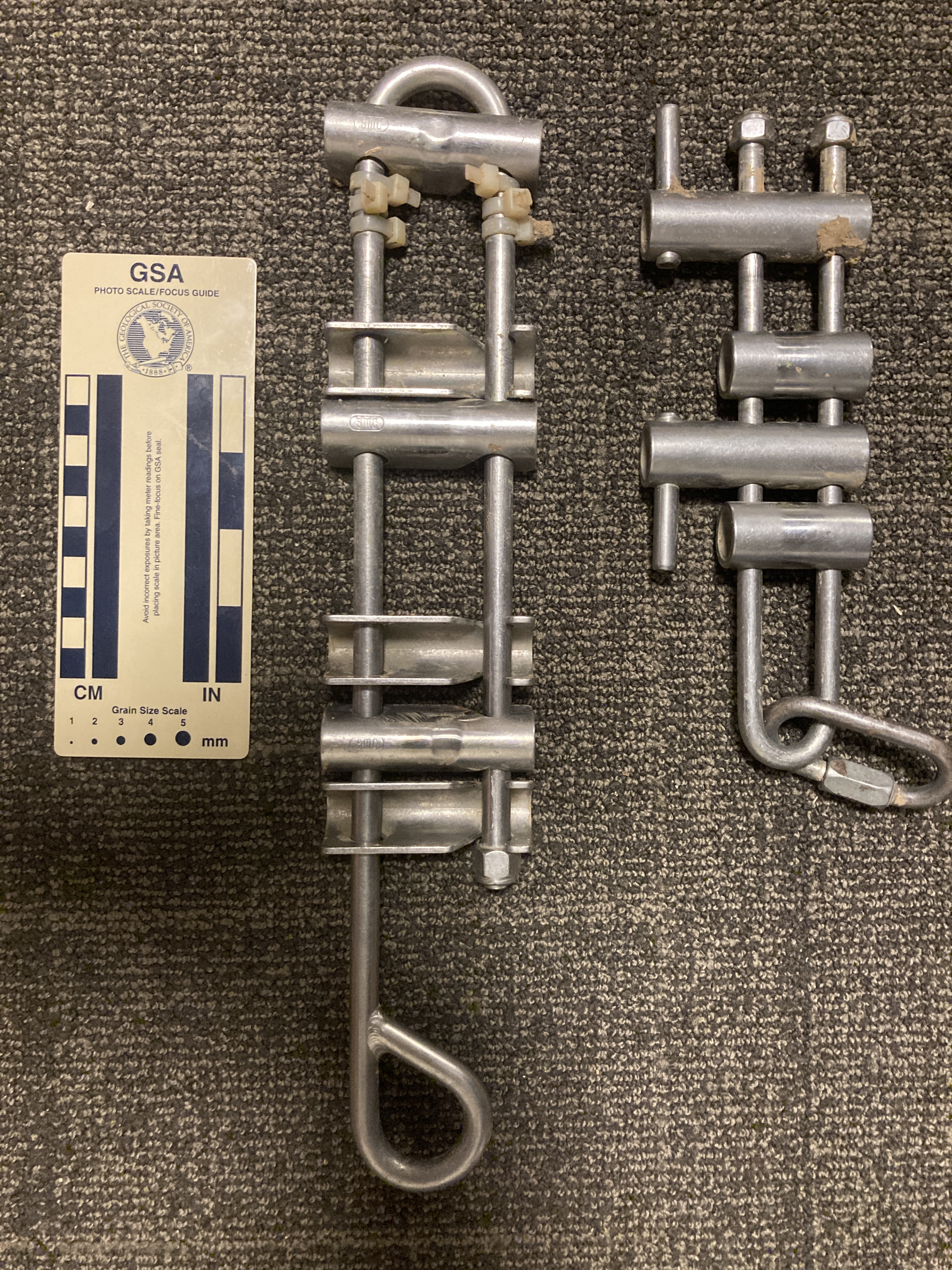
Two types of rappel rack, the larger is the traditional 6 bar rack, and the other is a more modern 4 bar microrack

The most common types of descenders are figure 8s, bobbins, and rappel racks. Other types of purpose built descenders are used, but are less common, such as the Super Rack or whaletails.Other objects used as rappel devices include everything from ATCs to specialty carabiners. Though the rope follows different paths, they all use friction to control the rate of descent, with heat produced as a waste product. Belay devices are also often employed in this capacity, since they have the capacity to rappel. Descenders can be largely divided into two categories, variable friction devices and fixed friction ones. This refers to the ability of the user to add or subtract friction, and therefore braking power, from the device while in use. Examples of fixed friction devices include the Petzl Stop or figure 8s. Variable friction devices include rappel racks and some types of figure 8s that include "horns" that the rope can be looped over to add friction. The choice to use one type over the other is largely dependent on the length of the descent, the activity being engaged in, and the personal preference of the user.

== Common use cases ==
- Vertical caving - Descenders are an essential part of vertical caving gear, as they facilitate a safe descent.
- Rope access - Descenders are used to descend to and maintain position at a work site.
- Arborist work - Used to lower out of trees during the felling or pruning process.
- Climbing - A belay device of some sort is typically used in this context.
- Rope rescue - Descenders can form an important part of the rescue process, and special descenders are produced for this application.
