= Bobbin (caving equipment) =

A bobbin is a class of descender that uses a set of "bobbins" to create friction. They are most commonly marketed to cavers and rope access technicians, and are very light when compared to other descender options. The most common bobbins are the Petzl Stop and Petzl Simple, but other companies such as Kong and Climbing Technologies also have designs.

== History ==
The predecessors of the bobbin go back to around 1865, when German fire brigades used a descender that operated on the same principles of the modern devices. The first modern designs were created in the 1960's by Bruno Dressler. He then gave the design to Fernand Petzl, who produced it as the Petzl Simple. Most modern devices, including the Petzl Stop, are descended from the Simple, though the idea for a descender similar in function to the Stop goes back to at least 1871.
