= Irata =

Irata or IRATA may refer to:

- Irata, a fictitious planet in the early 1980s computer game, M.U.L.E.
- IRATA, the Industrial Rope Access Trade Association.
- Iratta, a 2023 Indian film
