= John Beaumont (geologist) =

English physician and geologist

John Beaumont (c. 1650–1731) was an English physician and early geologist.

== Biography ==
John Beaumont was a physician who lived in Ston Easton in Somerset. He was encouraged by Robert Hooke to study the natural history of Somerset but became more interested in witchcraft.

He married Dorothy, daughter of John Speccott of Penheale, Egloskerry, Cornwall

== Geology ==
John Beaumont sent four letters to the Royal Society, two in 1676, one in 1681 and another in 1683. The topics he touched upon included rock plants, ailments afflicting both cattle and miners, detailed descriptions of some Mendip caves, including Wookey Hole Caves and Lamb Leer Cavern. He was elected a Fellow of the society in May 1685.

== Experience of spirits ==
I had two spirits, who constantly attended me, night and day, for above three months together, who called each other by their names; and several spirits would call at my chamber door, and ask whether such spirits lived there, and they would answer they did. As for the other spirits that attended me, I heard none of their names mentioned only I asked one spirit, which came for some nights together, and rung a little bell in my ear, what his name was, who answered Ariel. The two spirits that constantly attended myself appeared both in women's habit, they being of brown complexion, about three feet in stature; they had both black loose net-work gowns, tied with a black sash about the middle, and within the net-work appeared a gown of a golden colour, with somewhat of a light striking through it. Their heads were not dressed in top-knots, but they had white linen caps on, with lace on them about three fingers' breadth, and over it they had a black loose net-work hood.

I would not, for the whole world, undergo what I have undergone, upon spirits coming twice to me; their first coming was most dreadful to me, the thing being then altogether new, and consequently most surprising, though at the first coming they did not appear to me but only called to me at my chamber-windows, rung bells, sung to me, and played on music, etc.; but the last coming also carried terror enough; for when they came, being only five in number, the two women before mentioned, and three men (though afterwards there came hundreds), they told me they would kill me if I told any person in the house of their being there, which put me in some consternation; and I made a servant sit up with me four nights in my chamber, before a fire, it being in the Christmas holidays, telling no person of their being there. One of these spirits, in women's dress, lay down upon the bed by me every night; and told me, if I slept, the spirits would kill me, which kept me waking for three nights. In the meantime, a near relation of mine went (though unknown to me) to a physician of my acquaintance, desiring him to prescribe me somewhat for sleeping, which he did, and a sleeping potion was brought me; but I set it by, being very desirous and inclined to sleep without it. The fourth night I could hardly forbear sleeping; but the spirit, lying on the bed by me, told me again, I should be killed if I slept; whereupon I rose and sat by the fireside, and in a while returned to my bed; and so I did a third time, but was still threatened as before; whereupon I grew impatient, and asked the spirits what they would have? Told them I had done the part of a Christian, in humbling myself to God and feared them not; and rose from my bed, took a cane, and knocked at the ceiling of my chamber, a near relation of mine then lying over me, who presently rose and came down to me about two o'clock in the morning, to whom I said, 'You have seen me disturbed these four days past, and that I have not slept: the occasion of it was, that five spirits, which are not in the room with me, have threatened to kill me if I told any person of their being here, or if I slept; but I am not able to forbear sleeping longer, and acquaint you with it, and now stand in defiance of them'; and thus I exerted myself about them and notwithstanding their continued threats I slept very well the next night, and continued to do so, though they continued with me above three months, day and night.

== Books ==
- Considerations on a book, entituled The theory of the earth, publisht some years since by the Dr. Burnet 1693
- A postscript to a book published last year entituled Considerations on Dr. Burnet's Theory of the earth 1694
- The present state of the universe 1697
- An Historical Physiological and Theological Treatise of Spirits, Apparitions, Witchcrafts, and Other Magical Practises 1705.
- Gleanings of Antiquities 1724

== See also ==
- Pit cave
