= Single-rope technique =

Climbing technique

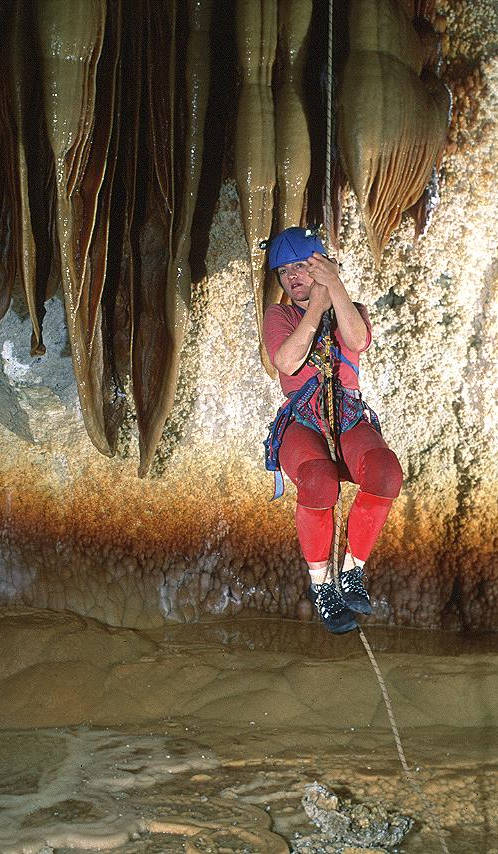
The two-ascender "frog" is a sit-stand system. It is used among cavers worldwide.

Single-rope technique (SRT) is a set of methods used to ascend and descend a single fixed rope length, commonly used in caving, rock climbing, canyoning, roped access for building maintenance, and by arborists for tree climbing. To avoid confusion in the tree climbing community, it is occasionally referred to as "stationary" rope technique.

Single-rope techniques are used in contrast to double-rope techniques (DRT), also known as the moving-rope techniques.

== Historical developments ==
In the 1930s, as caving became increasingly popular in France, several clubs in the Alps made vertical cave exploration an outdoor sport. During World War II, a team composed of Pierre Chevalier, Fernand Petzl, Charles Petit-Didier, and others explored the Dent de Crolles cave system near Grenoble, France, which became the deepest explored cave in the world (–658m) at that time. The lack of available equipment during the war forced Pierre Chevalier and the rest of the team to develop their own equipment, leading to technical innovation. The first use of single-rope techniques with prusik and mechanical rope ascenders (Henri Brenot's "monkeys", first used by Chevalier and Brenot in a cave in 1934) can be directly traced back to the exploration of the Dent de Crolles cave system. American caver Bill Cuddington, known as "Vertical Bill", developed single-rope techniques in the U.S. in the late 1950s. In 1958, two Swiss alpinists, Juesi and Marti, teamed together, creating the first commercially available rope ascender known as the Jumar. In 1968, Bruno Dressler asked Petzl, who worked as a metals machinist, to build a rope-ascending tool, today known as the Petzl Croll, that he had developed by adapting the Jumar for pit caving. Petzl started a small caving equipment manufacturing company, Petzl, which manufactures equipment for caving, climbing, mountaineering and at-height safety in civil engineering. The rappel rack was developed in the late 1960s by cavers in the Huntsville, Alabama, caving club to facilitate long descents. The evolution of mechanical ascension systems helped extend the practice and safety of pit exploration.

=== Ascent ===
For ascent (prusiking or "jugging"), cammed devices (ascenders) are used. These have a set of directional teeth that can be pushed up the rope but bite into the rope to hold the user's weight when a downward force is applied; these must also be easily removable from the rope without being detached from the user. Knots such as the prusik, Bachmann, and Klemheist are used to ascend ropes in emergencies in climbing and mountaineering; they have ceased to be the primary ascent method in single-rope techniques because they are slow in use, and ice or mud greatly reduce their efficiency.

Numerous ascending systems have been devised with tradeoffs in terms of:

- Efficiency
- Size and weight of the required gear
- Ability to haul heavy loads
- Ease of fit
- Time to get on/off the rope
- Crossing over rock shelves
- Passing knots and rebelays
- Downclimbing
- Versatility
- Changeovers

SRT systems generally fall under two main categories:

- Sit-stand — one ascender is at chest level attached to the sit harness, and a second is held in the hand with a long loop of rope for the feet. Movement up the rope is by repeated moving of the foot loop ascender up the rope, pushing up with both feet together, and sitting, supported by the chest ascender. This motion appears like a frog kick. Common systems include the frog and Texas kick.
- Rope-walking — one ascender is attached directly to one foot, and the second connected to the other foot by a rope, with the ascender higher up to avoid clashing. Movement up the rope is by alternate stepping movements with the feet. Common systems include ropewalker and mitchell.

=== Descent ===
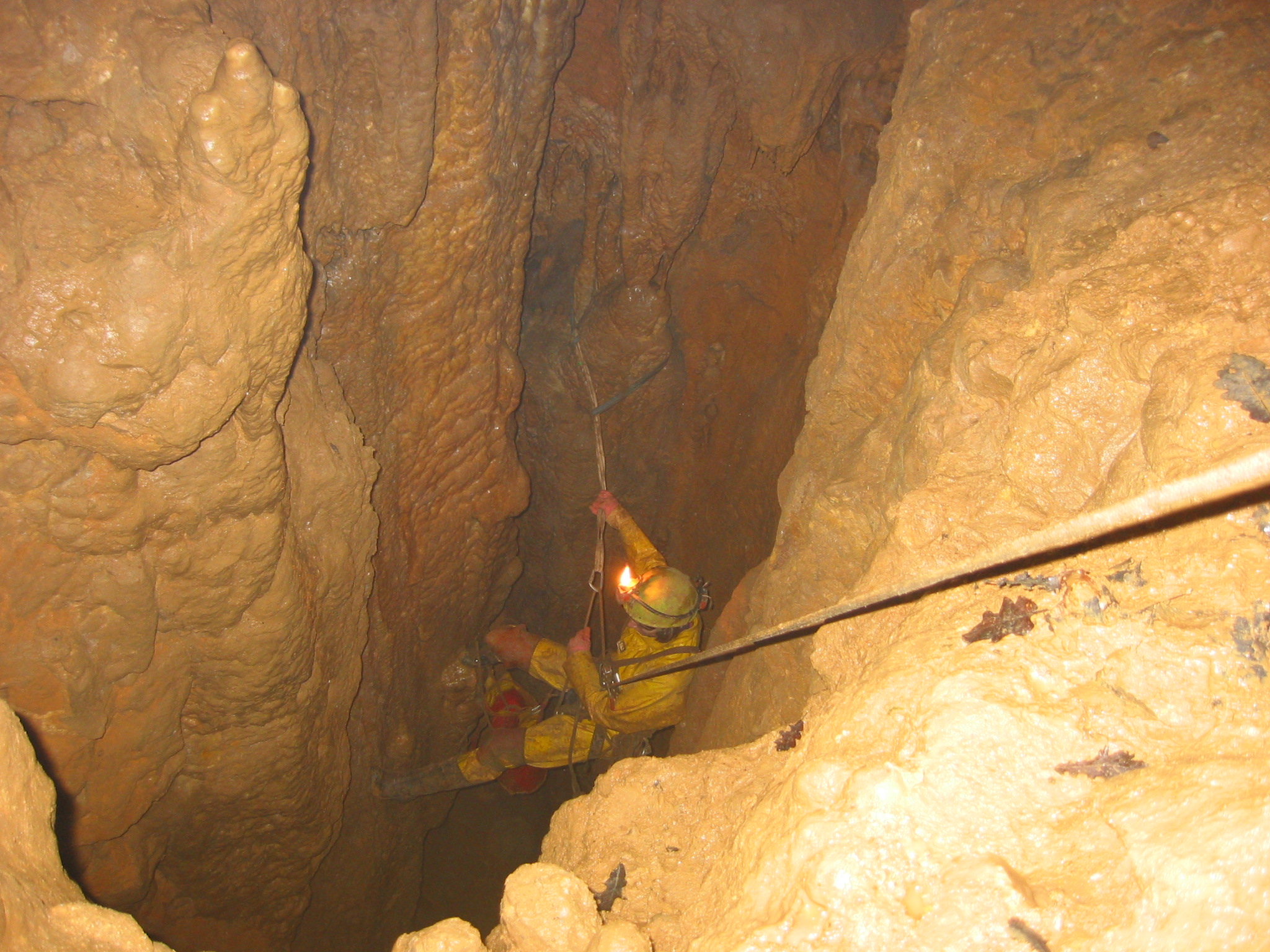
Caver passing a deviation

Modern single-rope techniques use specialized devices for both descent and ascent, and low-stretch kernmantel rope of 8-11 mm diameter. Descent (abseiling or rappelling) uses various types of descenders to control speed. The most commonly used are the Petzl Stop (self-locking) and Bobbin, and rappel racks. For safe single-rope technique, especially on drops with complex rigging with intermediate belays, it is essential that the abseiling device can be removed from the rope without being unclipped from the harness. This is a problem with the simplest device, the single-piece figure eight. These also twist the rope, which is a problem if there is a rebelay below so the rope cannot untwist itself. Figure eights and racks do have the advantage of being able to be used on a doubled rope. Other essential items of a personal single-rope technique set are a sit harness and one or more safety cords ("cow's tails") terminated in carabiners, for temporary attachment to safety ropes at the heads of drops and used in maneuvers at intermediate rope belays. To pass intermediate belays on a descent, the ascending devices may also be required.

== Rigging ==
How the rope is sent down a shaft has great bearing on the type of single-rope technique used. In general, while rope-walking techniques may be very effective for climbing long, unobstructed pitches, they prove less versatile in cases of awkward passages and complex rope rigging with re-belays used to avoid hazards such as loose rocks, waterfalls, and rope damage from rub points.

Rigging in the United States is typically done using a single anchor point, and pitches are rigged as a single long drop, often in excess of 100 meters. The rope is usually a thick, abrasion-resistant type, which allows the rope to go over the lip of a shaft in contact with the rock. This is sometimes pejoratively called the Indestructible Rope Technique. To descend such large drops on a bobbin-type descender would be difficult owing to the thickness and stiffness of the rope, and the resulting descent would be slow and jerky. The bobbin-descender could also overheat and melt the surface of the rope. Racks are preferred as they have a much larger heat-sink capacity and offer a much smoother descent on such pitches. Using the frog system to ascend long pitches is time consuming, so rope-walking systems are preferred.

In Europe, pitches are often more complex, and multi-pitch rigging is used extensively. Long drops are broken into smaller pitches. Re-belays and deviations are used to direct the rope away from areas of sharp rock and from water. Where rope-rub cannot be avoided, rope protectors are installed. Traverses are often installed to allow the rigger to reach an area where it is possible to hang the rope with no rub. Since allowing the rope to rub against the walls is prevented, lighter ropes are used, usually 8–9 mm thick. This has the advantage of being lighter and therefore more economical to carry on long or deep trips. Bobbin descenders are quicker to change over at re-belays and are also lighter to carry. Deviations are short lengths of tape or rope pulling the main rope to one side with a carabiner, which can be conveniently unclipped and replaced to allow passing. Rope-walking techniques are less effective in cases of awkward passageways and for changeovers at rebelays. Many caves have been equipped with bolt holes consisting of internally threaded metal inserts fixed into holes drilled in the rock. Subsequent visitors carry their own belay eyelets to bolt into these points. Selecting the best position for bolts needs particular care, the aim often being to achieve a Y-shaped rope hang between two bolts on opposite walls. This technique can help to prevent the rope from coming in contact with the rock, shares the load between the two belays, and reduces the shock load should one fail (in comparison with the use of a slack backup rope).

== See also ==
- Pit cave
- Ascender (climbing)
