= Hellhole (cave) =

Pit cave in West Virginia, United States

Coordinates: 38.771°N 79.378°W

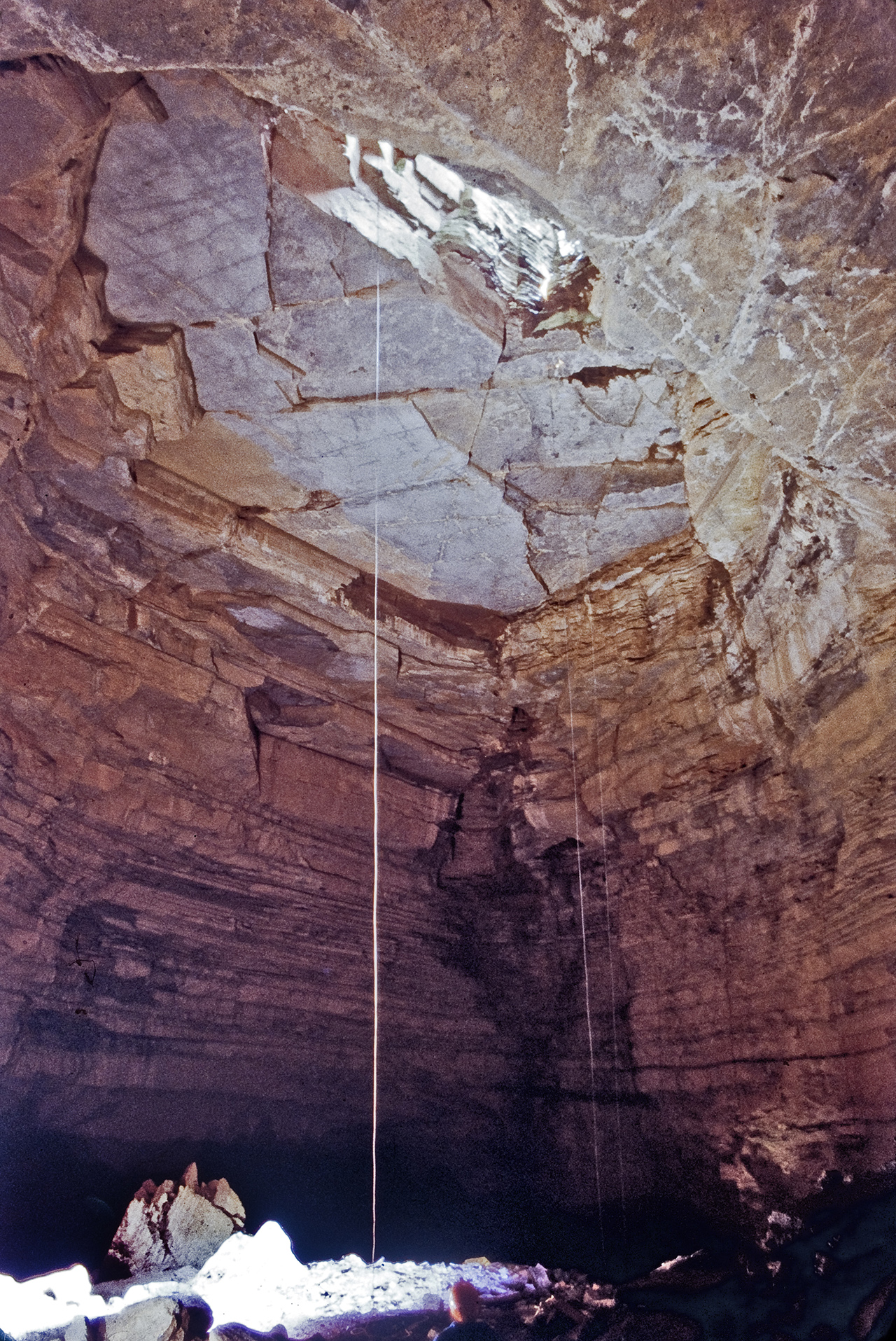
- Pit entrance of Hellhole. Note caver visible at extreme bottom.
- Interactive map of Hellhole
- Location: Germany Valley, West Virginia
- Depth: 737 ft (225 m)
- Length: 43.6 miles (70.2 km)
- Discovery: 1940s
- Geology: New Market limestone
- Entrances: 1
- Hazards: bat cave
- Access: private

Hellhole is a large and deep pit cave in Germany Valley of eastern West Virginia. It is the seventh longest cave in the United States and is home to almost half of the world's population of Virginia big-eared bats. At 737 feet (225 m), Hellhole is the deepest of several caves in the Valley.

Hellhole has had a long and storied association with the National Speleological Society dating back to the creation of that organization in the early 1940s. Many basic caving techniques (e.g., the single rope technique) were developed in Hellhole's 154-foot (47-meter) entrance drop.

== Description ==
The only known entrance to Hellhole is a funnel-shaped pit entrance on the lower slopes of North Fork Mountain. Descent by rope through this spectacular and storied 154-foot (47 m) entrance shaft gives access to a vast chamber. From the time exploration began there in the 1940s, cavers have documented over 41 miles (66 km) of mapped passage in the Hellhole system.

"Little Hellhole" is a well known pit deeper in the cave.

Hellhole's passages are developed predominantly in a layer of limestone known as the New Market. This same limestone is of remarkable commercial quality and is the primary object of the nearby Greer Lime Company open pit mining operations.

== Ecology ==
=== Bat biology ===
Hellhole is a hibernaculum site for two endangered and federally protected species of bats. For the Virginia big-eared bat (Corynorhinus townsendii virginianus), it is one of the largest hibernation sites in the world. There are estimated to be about 9,000 individuals in the cave, as against a total world population of about 20,000. Thus, Hellhole contains about 45% of the world's total population. The cave is the largest hibernation site in the mid-Atlantic region for the Indiana bat (Myotis sodalis). The cave contains about 9,000 of these as well, many more than any other cave in the region. In addition, the cave is one of the world's three or four largest hibernation sites for little brown bats (Myotis lucifugus), containing over 100,000 individual bats. Finally, the cave is also home to at least four other bat species.

In 2010, the West Virginia Division of Natural Resources entered the cave to document effects of white-nose syndrome on the various species of bats. White-nose syndrome had been reported in Hamilton Cave, West Virginia the prior year and the 2010 survey found evidence of white-nose syndrome in Hellhole as well, primarily affecting the little brown bats. 66,789 bats were counted in the survey, a decline of 40% in total bat numbers from 2007.

=== Other species ===
Hellhole contains rare cave invertebrates, including the Germany Valley Cave Millipede (Pseudotremia lusciosa) and the Luray Caverns Blind Cave Millipede (Trichopetalum whitei).

== History ==
From the 1940s, when exploration of Hellhole began, to the 1980s, cavers had mapped approximately 8.5 miles (13.7 km) of passage in the popular Hellhole system. But Hellhole was essentially closed to the caving community in 1988, two years after a lease on the land including its entrance was obtained by the Greer Limestone Plant, a part of Greer Industries, Inc. in the nearby town of Riverton. The only exception to this was the bi-annual bat counts sponsored by the United States Fish and Wildlife Service (USFWS). In 2002, after prolonged negotiations with Greer (which in 2000 had proposed in public documents to expand its operations to the north and south of its existing open pit quarry), the USFWS, West Virginia Department of Natural Resources (WV DNR), West Virginia Department of Environmental Protection (WV DEP), caving organizations and local landowners, the Germany Valley Karst Survey (GVKS) was contracted to pursue a survey of the extent of the cave. The landowner who has never wished to sell the land around it. The quarry, immediately to the west of the cave entrance, is operated by Greer Limestone Company (owned by West Virginia businessman and politician John Raese). Greer leased the entrance to Hellhole from the landowner in 1986, and as the lessee, soon began to deny most access to the cave. Greer did allow the West Virginia Division of Natural Resources (WV DNR) to conduct bi-annual trips into the cave for the purpose of counting the populations of endangered bat species. In the 1990s, at urging of the WV DNR, Greer also began to allow limited exploration and mapping of the cave (one or two trips per year).

In accordance with USFWS requirements regarding endangered bats, all annual survey activities have to be completed within a 16-week window during the summer months. In a feat of epic caving over the next three years (2002–2005), members of the GVKS surveyed more than 12 miles (19 km) of virgin passage, increasing the known length of the cave from 8.5 to 20.3 miles (13.7 to 32.7 kilometers), and established Hellhole as the deepest cave drop in West Virginia—265 feet (81 m). Subsequent investigations extended these numbers to 28.28 mapped miles (45.51 kilometers) and 519 feet (158 m) of depth.

In 1995 an extension to the cave ("Krause Hall") was discovered in the extreme northwest portion of the cave. In 1996 one of the deepest sections of the cave was explored at over 400 feet (120 m) below the entrance elevation. In 1997, a break-through discovery off this area extended the known extent of Hellhole well to the south of its originally known range. This showed that the historically known portions of Hellhole were a mere side passage to a much larger cave system.

By this time the U.S. Fish and Wildlife Service had recognized Hellhole as a critical habitat for two species of endangered (and federally protected) bat, the Indiana bat (Myotis sodalis) and the Virginia big-eared bat (Corynorhinus townsendii virginianus). It was known that about 45% of the world's estimated 20,000 remaining Virginia big-eared bats hibernate in Hellhole. Greer had responded by establishing a no-work buffer zone of 250 feet (76 m) and a no-blast buffer zone of 500 feet (150 m) from the nearest known passage in Hellhole. That word "known" proved to be the bone of contention.

The reason Hellhole is such an important cave for these bats is its unusually low ambient air temperature. Most caves in West Virginia average around 57 °F (14 °C). Hellhole averages around 47 °F (8 °C). This cold temperature is critical for these species survival. The cave remains cool because it functions as a natural cold air trap. Located in the middle of an enclosed valley, and having only one entrance, cold air flowing off North Fork Mountain in winter collects in the cave. Cold air goes down, and having no place to escape, stays down, filling the cave's massive passages. This cold air collecting phenomenon is what makes the cave so vulnerable to accidental damage from quarrying activities. If this natural cold air trap were to be breached at an elevation lower than the entrance, the cold air would quickly flow out, and the cave would likely no longer function as a bat hibernaculum, at least for these particular species.

With the advent of the 1997 discoveries, Greer was threatened with the potential loss of a valuable section of limestone to the endangered species habitat. From that point forward Greer permitted no further exploration of Hellhole. Cavers perceived that because the quarry did not wish to lose any further areas of limestone to bat habitat, it effectively began to impede further exploration and, therefore, "knowledge" of the cave's extent.

In 2000, Greer announced its intention to seek a renewal permit to continue its quarrying operations in Germany Valley and to extend them to the north and south of the existing open pit. This request was filed publicly, as required by the West Virginia Department of Environmental Protection (WV DEP) requirements, and it ignited a furor among Virginia and West Virginia cavers who began petitioning officials and started a letter campaign. In their view, it was highly likely that quarry operations, conducted with a lack of knowledge regarding the cave's complete extent, would in time penetrate some portion of the cave. Such an event, it was argued, would have disastrous effects upon the suitability of the cave as an endangered bat species hibernaculum. In 2002—after prolonged negotiations with Greer—the USFWS, West Virginia Department of Natural Resources (WV DNR), WV DEP, caving organizations and local landowners, the Germany Valley Karst Survey (GVKS) was formally contracted to survey the extent of the Hellhole cave system. In accordance with USFWS requirements regarding endangered bats, all annual survey activities must be completed within a 16-week window during the summer months. Since that time, the known extent of the cave has expanded to 38.8 mapped miles (62.4 kilometers) and 694 feet (212 m) of depth.

In June 2015, official reporting on the total length of Hellhole was updated to 42 miles (68 km) and depth to 737 feet (225 m).

== Miscellany ==
- According to the NSS Geo2 Committee on Long and Deep Caves (as of 23 September 2015), Hellhole is the 38th longest cave in the world.

== See also ==
- List of longest caves in the United States
