= Pit cave =

Cave with significant vertical passages

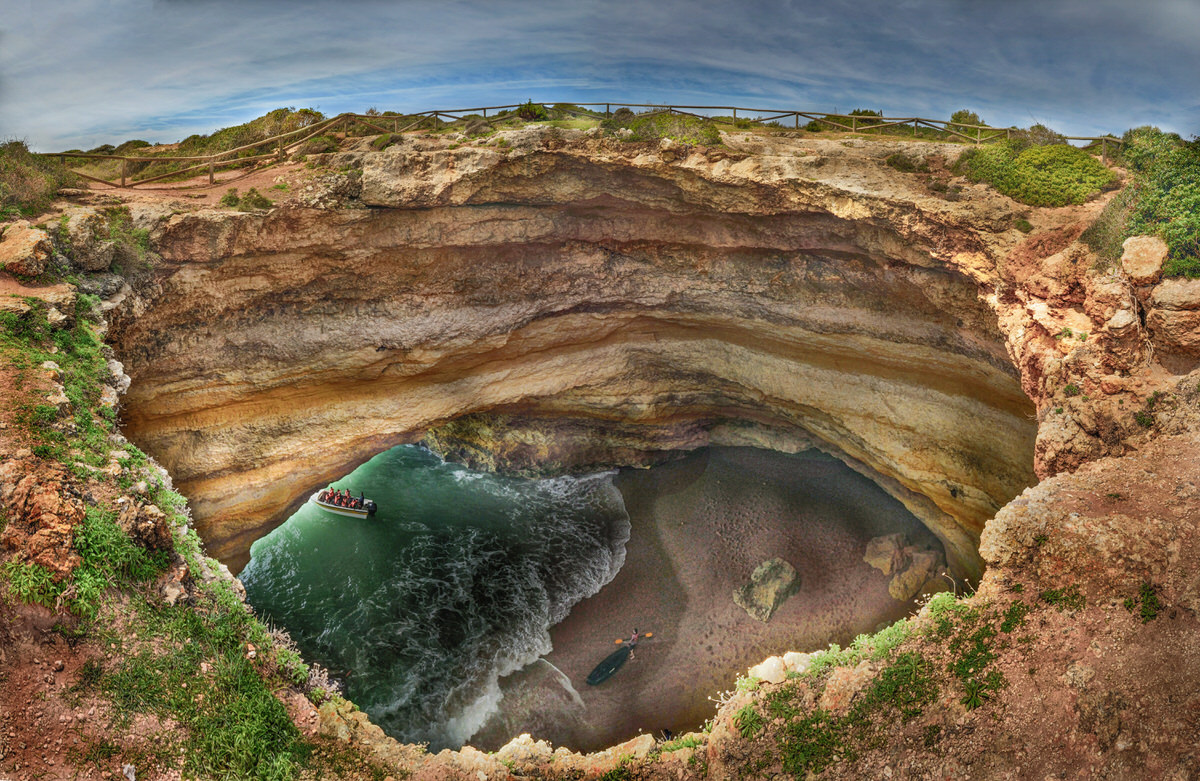
Pit cave near Benagil in Lagoa, Portugal

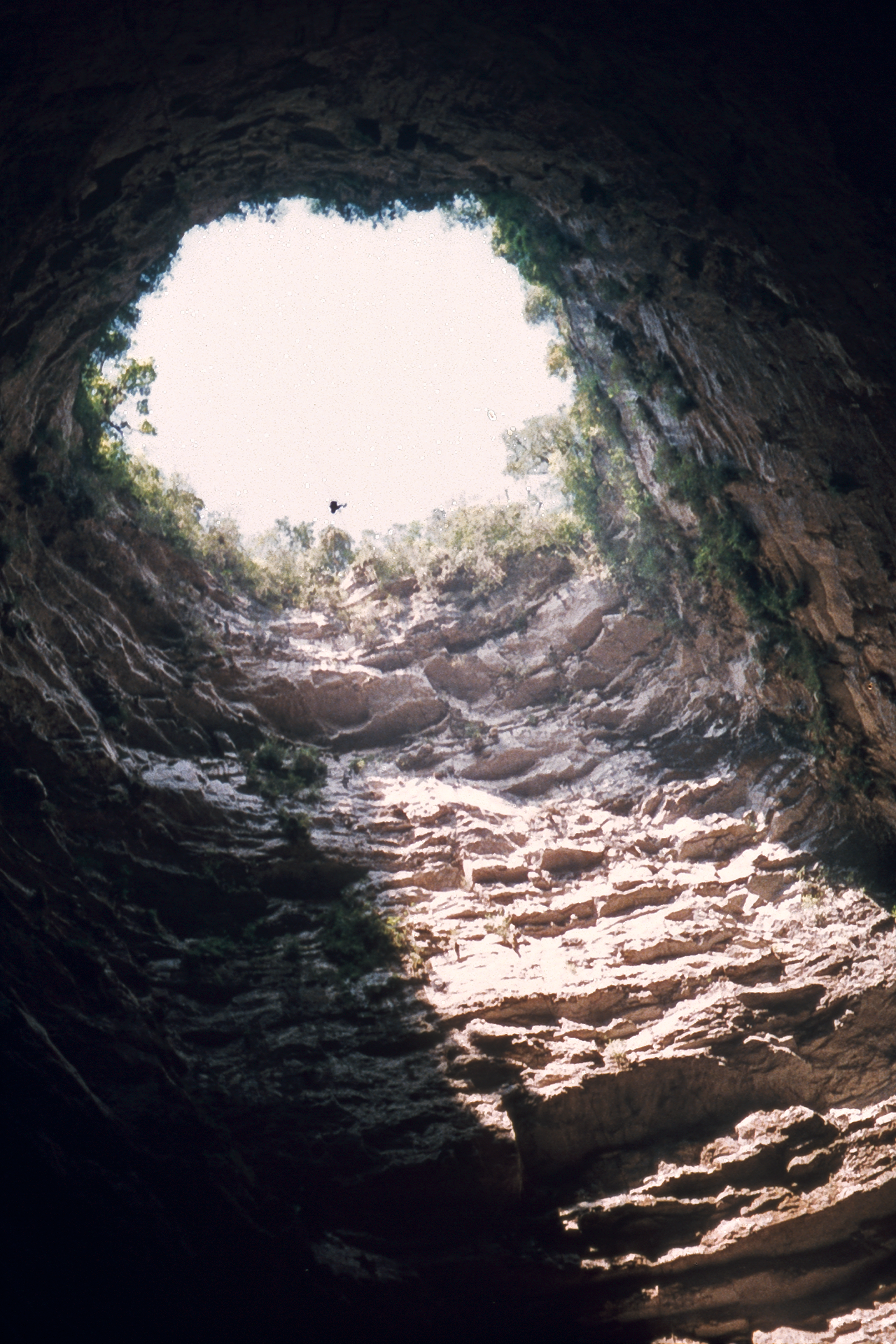
A caver rappelling into Mexico's enormous pit cave, Sotano de las Golondrinas

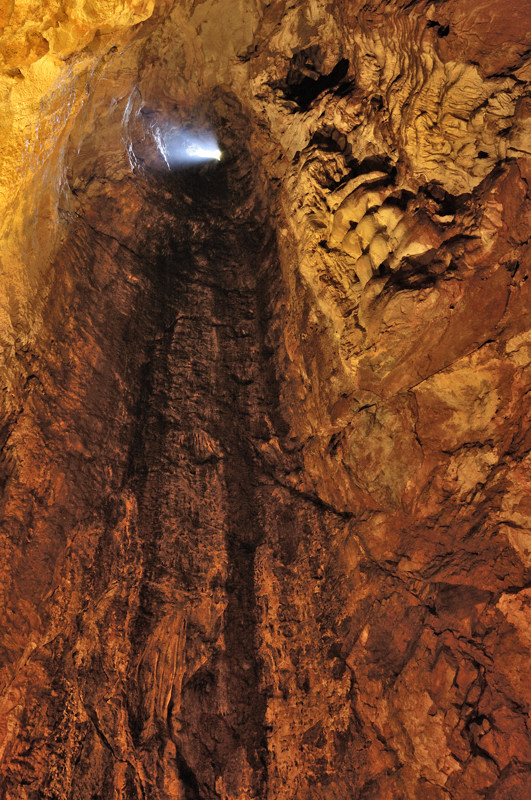
Pit cave Haviareň, Little Carpathians

A pit cave, shaft cave or vertical cave—or often simply called a pit (in the US) and pothole or pot (in the UK); jama in Slavic languages scientific and colloquial vocabulary (borrowed since early research in the Western Balkan Dinaric Alpine karst)—is a type of cave which contains one or more significant vertical shafts rather than being predominantly a conventional horizontal cave passage. Pits typically form in limestone as a result of long-term erosion by water. They can be open to the surface or found deep within horizontal caves. Among US cavers, a pit, usually referred to as a 'pitch' in UK English, is a vertical drop of any depth that cannot be negotiated safely without the use of ropes or ladders.

== Pit caving ==
=== Techniques ===
Exploration of pit caves ("vertical caving", also called "potholing" in the UK and "pit caving" in US English) requires the use of equipment such as nylon kernmantle rope or cable ladders. The specialized caving techniques of single rope technique (SRT) are common practice and the preferred method of pit exploration for cavers worldwide. SRT involves the use of 8–11 mm nylon static rope and mechanical descenders/ascenders.

Vertical caving is a specialized sport that should be undertaken only after acquiring knowledge of, and expertise in, proper vertical caving equipment and its use. For obvious reasons, vertical caving is more dangerous than "horizontal caving". Vertical caving requires an understanding of ropes, knots, anchors, abseiling/rappelling devices and ascending systems, and techniques for passing rebelays, deviations, knot passes (where two ropes are joined mid-hang) and changeovers (the act of switching from rappel to climb, or vice versa, whilst on rope). Experienced cavers are typically knowledgeable in self-rescue techniques such as rigging pulley-jammers and doing pick-offs (the act of rescuing a stranded caver from his rope and returning him/her to the ground).

=== History ===
Pit caving was pioneered by the English geologist John Beaumont (c. 1650–1731) who gave an account of his descent into Lamb Leer Cavern to the Royal Society in 1681. French caver Édouard-Alfred Martel (1859–1938) first achieved the descent and exploration of the Gouffre de Padirac, France, as early as 1889 and the first complete descent of a 110 m (360 ft) wet vertical shaft at Gaping Gill, in Yorkshire, England, in 1895. He developed his own techniques using ropes and metallic ladders. In the 1930s, as caving became increasingly popular in France, several clubs in the Alps developed vertical cave exploration into a recognized outdoor sport.

During World War II, a team composed of Pierre Chevalier, Fernand Petzl, Charles Petit-Didier and others explored the Dent de Crolles cave system near Grenoble, France. It became known as the deepest cave in the world (658 m (2,159 ft)) at that time. The lack of available technical equipment during the war forced Chevalier and his team to innovate and develop their own. The scaling-pole (1940), nylon ropes (1942), use of explosives in caves (1947), and mechanical rope ascenders (Henri Brenot's "monkeys", first used by Chevalier and Brenot in a cave in 1934) can be traced historically to the exploration of the Dent de Crolles cave system.

In the late 1950s, American caver Bill Cuddington further developed the single rope technique (SRT) in the United States. In 1958, two Swiss alpinists, Juesi and Marti, teamed up, creating the first rope ascender, known as the Jumar. In 1968, Bruno Dressler asked Petzl, who worked as a metals machinist, to build a rope-ascending tool, today known as the Petzl Croll, which he had developed by adapting the Jumar to the specificity of pit caving. Pursuing these developments, in the 1970s Fernand Petzl started a small caving equipment manufacturing company. The development of the rappel rack and the evolution of mechanical ascension systems, notably helped extend the practice and safety of pit exploration to a larger practice by established cavers.

== Notable pit caves and underground pitches ==
=== Europe ===
- The deepest individual pitch (vertical drop) within a cave is 603 m (1,978 ft) in Vrtoglavica Cave in Slovenia.
- The second deepest pitch is Patkov Gušt at 553 m (1,814 ft) in the Velebit mountain, Croatia.
- Lamb Leer, Somerset, England, was entered by a 25 m (82 ft) pitch as early as the 17th century.
- Hranice Abyss, Czech Republic, is the deepest underwater cave in the world, the lowest confirmed depth (as of August 2022) is 519.5 m (1,704 ft) (450 m under the water level), the expected depth is 700–800 m.
- Pozzo del Merro, Italy, is the world's second deepest underwater pit cave, the deepest part reached (as of October 2014) is 392 m (1,286 ft).
- Gouffre Mirolda, Haute-Savoie, France, has a depth of −1,733 m (−5,686 ft).

=== United States ===
- El Capitan Pit, Prince of Wales Island, Alaska, USA, at 598.3 ft (182.4 m) is the deepest vertical shaft in the United States.
- Fantastic Pit, Ellisons Cave System, Georgia, USA, at 586 ft (179 m) is the deepest freefall pit in the lower 48 United States.
- Stupendous Pit, Rumbling Falls Cave, Tennessee, USA, is a 202 ft (62 m) pit that drops into a 26 acres (110,000 m^{2}) chamber.
- Hellhole, West Virginia, USA, has a 154 ft (47 m) entrance drop and was the site of development of the single rope technique in the 1950s and '60s.
- Natural Trap Cave, located in the Bighorn Mountains of Wyoming, is 85 ft (26 m) deep and home to one of the largest fossil discoveries in North America.

=== Mexico ===
- Sótano de Las Golondrinas ("Cave of Swallows"), San Luis Potosí, Mexico, at 333.5 m (1,094 ft), is the deepest known freefall drop in the western hemisphere.
- Cenote Poza El Zacatón, Tamaulipas, Mexico, is the world's deepest cenote at 339 m (1,112 ft)

== Gallery ==
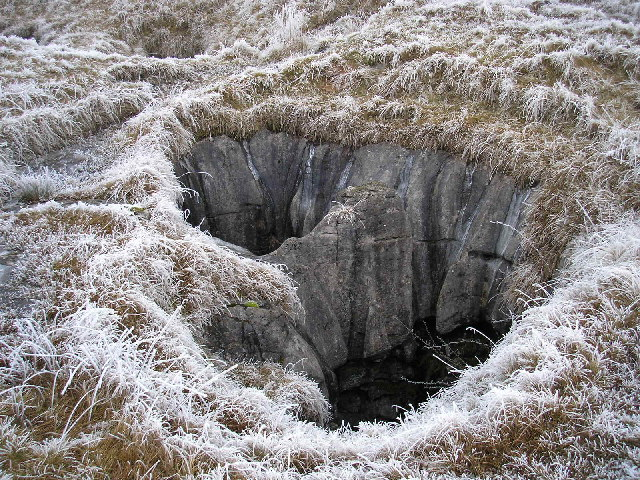
Fluted pothole, England

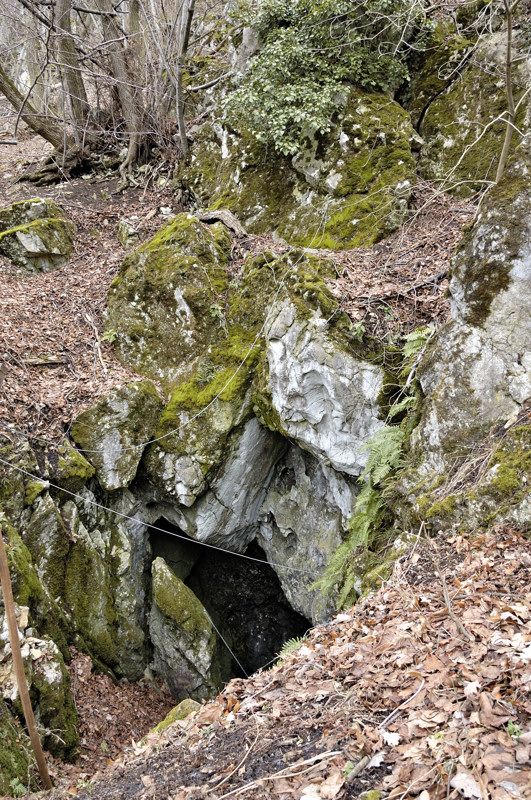
Pit cave PP2, Slovakia

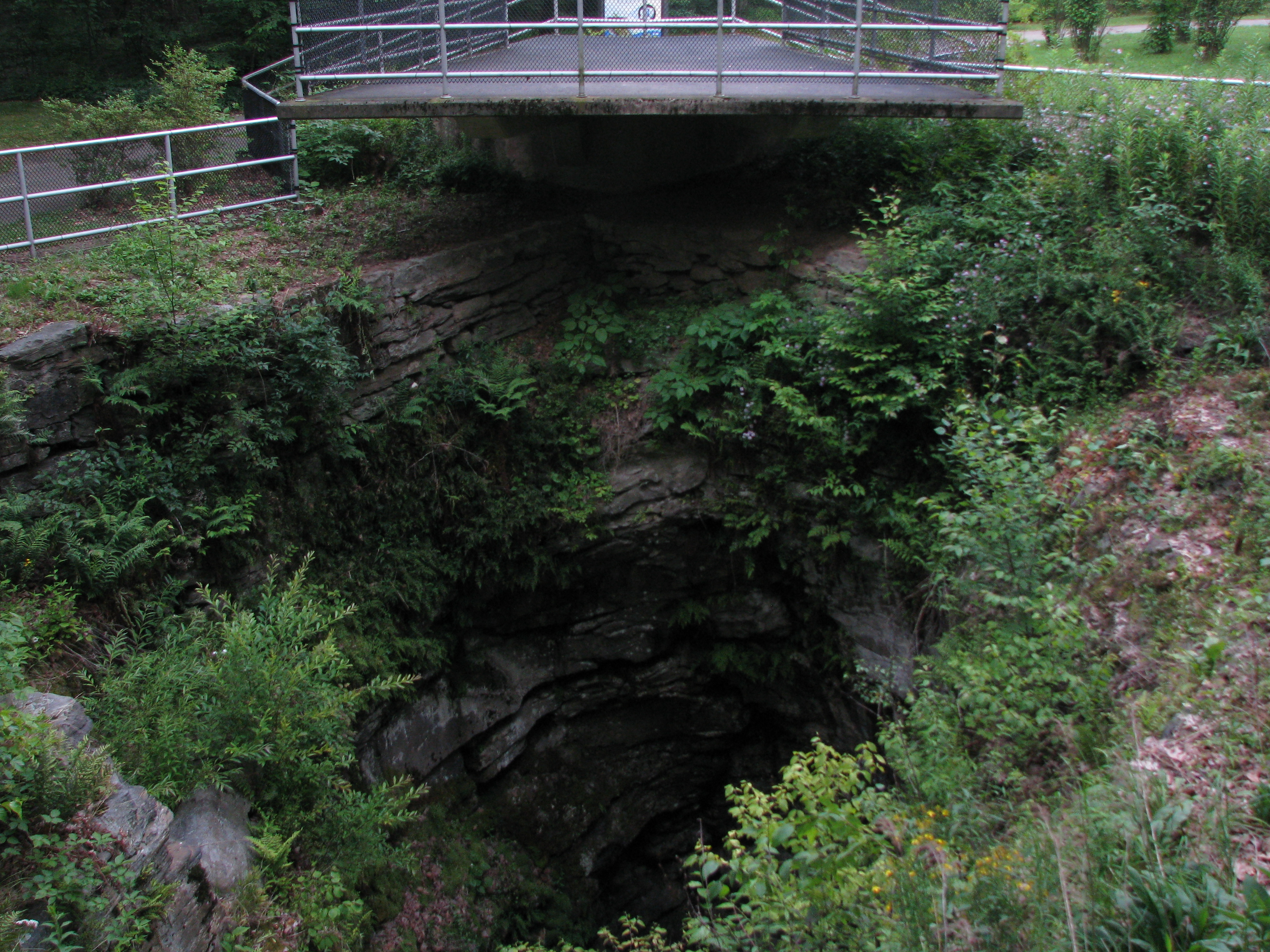
Cave in Archbald Pothole State Park, United States

== See also ==
- Cenotes and Blue holes (vertical cave sinkhole filled with water)
- Pit crater
- Pitch (vertical space)
- List of sinkholes
