= Lamb Leer =

Protected area in Somerset, England

- Site of Special Scientific Interest
- Location within Somerset
- Location of Lamb Leer.
- Area of search: Somerset
- Grid reference: ST544550
- Coordinates: 51.2923°N 2.6553°W
- Interest: Geological
- Area: 14.59 hectares (0.1459 km^{2}; 0.0563 sq mi)
- Notification date: 1983

Lamb Leer Cavern
- Interactive map of Lamb Leer Cavern
- Location: West Harptree
- OS grid: ST54325506
- Depth: 67 m (220 ft)
- Length: 640 m (2,100 ft)
- Discovery: 1676
- Geology: Limestone
- Access: Not permitted
- Registry: Mendip Cave Registry

Lamb Leer (grid reference ST544550) is a 14.59 hectare (36.04 acre) geological Site of Special Scientific Interest between East Harptree and Priddy in the Mendip Hills, Somerset, notified in 1983. The cavern is a fragment of a very ancient major cave system which now contains one of the largest chambers in the Mendip Hills.

== History ==
Several explanations have been suggested for the origin of the name. One links to an old name for the area which was "Lambden". An alternative suggestion is that in the 1670s miners spoke of "leirey places, that is cavernous" which links to the German word "leer" which means void and may have been introduced by German miners. A more likely explanation is from the Anglo-Saxon word "lear" meaning empty or void.

Lamb Leer Cavern was first found by miners looking for lead around 1676, and in 1681, the geologist John Beaumont, the pioneer of pit caving, gave an account of his descent into the cave to the Royal Society. It was rediscovered in 1880, when a new shaft was driven in, and became something of a tourist attraction. By the 1920s, the new shaft had become blocked and in 1936 the original entrance was re-opened. In the late 1930s, a cablecar was in place across the Great Chamber. Additional chambers were discovered in the 1960s and 1970s.

In 1974, an un-lifelined caver fell off a ladder in Lamb Leer Cavern, and a novice caver who was at the bottom of the ladder was badly injured, resulting in legal action against the caving club for damages.

== Access ==
Access to this cave is not permitted by the landowner.

== Description ==
The system is dry, lying well above the present day water-table, and it is thought that the passages may well have originated before the Ice Age (Pleistocene Period) began. Sediments preserved in the caves are important as they allow geologists to study the record of the changing environmental conditions which occurred over this long period of time.

The entrance shaft is known as Beaumont Shaft. The first large chamber encountered is The Beehive which contains a large stalagmite boss. Next is the Great Chamber which is 30 metres (98 ft) high and 20 metres (66 ft) across, and contains some formations. A passage from the roof of the Great Chamber leads to the St Valentine Series of passages, a number of which are well decorated.

== See also ==
- Caves of the Mendip Hills
- Pit cave
