= Cave of Swallows =

Pit cave in Aquismón, San Luis Potosí, Mexico

Coordinates: 21°35′59″N 99°05′56″W

- Sótano de las Golondrinas
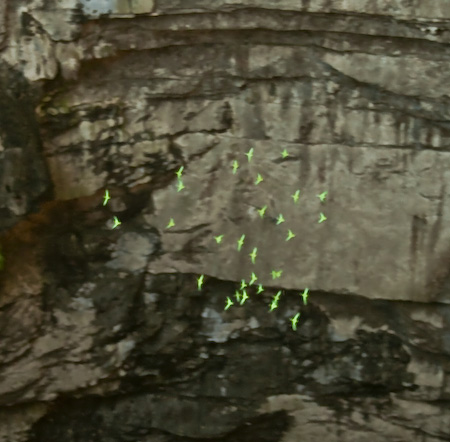
- A flock of conures in the Cave of Swallows
- Interactive map of Cave of Swallows
- Location: Aquismón, San Luis Potosí, Mexico
- Length: VR = 515 m Entrance pit: L = 135 m; W = 305 m; H = 333–376 m; Ar = 33,110 m²
- Discovery: 27 December 1966
- Hazards: Free fall
- Access: No restrictions to view entrance; permit required to descend

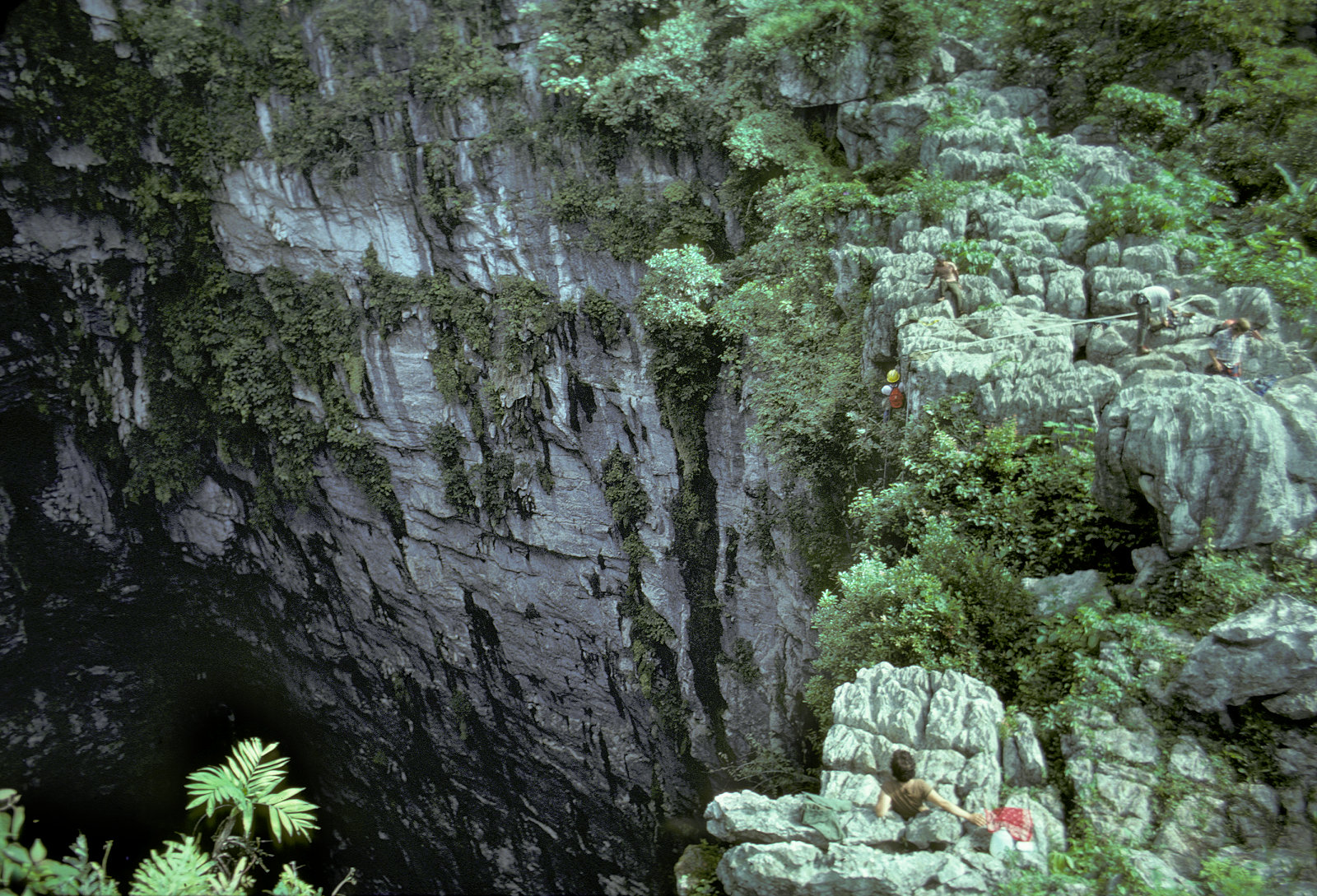
Top of Golondrinas as viewed from the low side, during a descent made in 1979

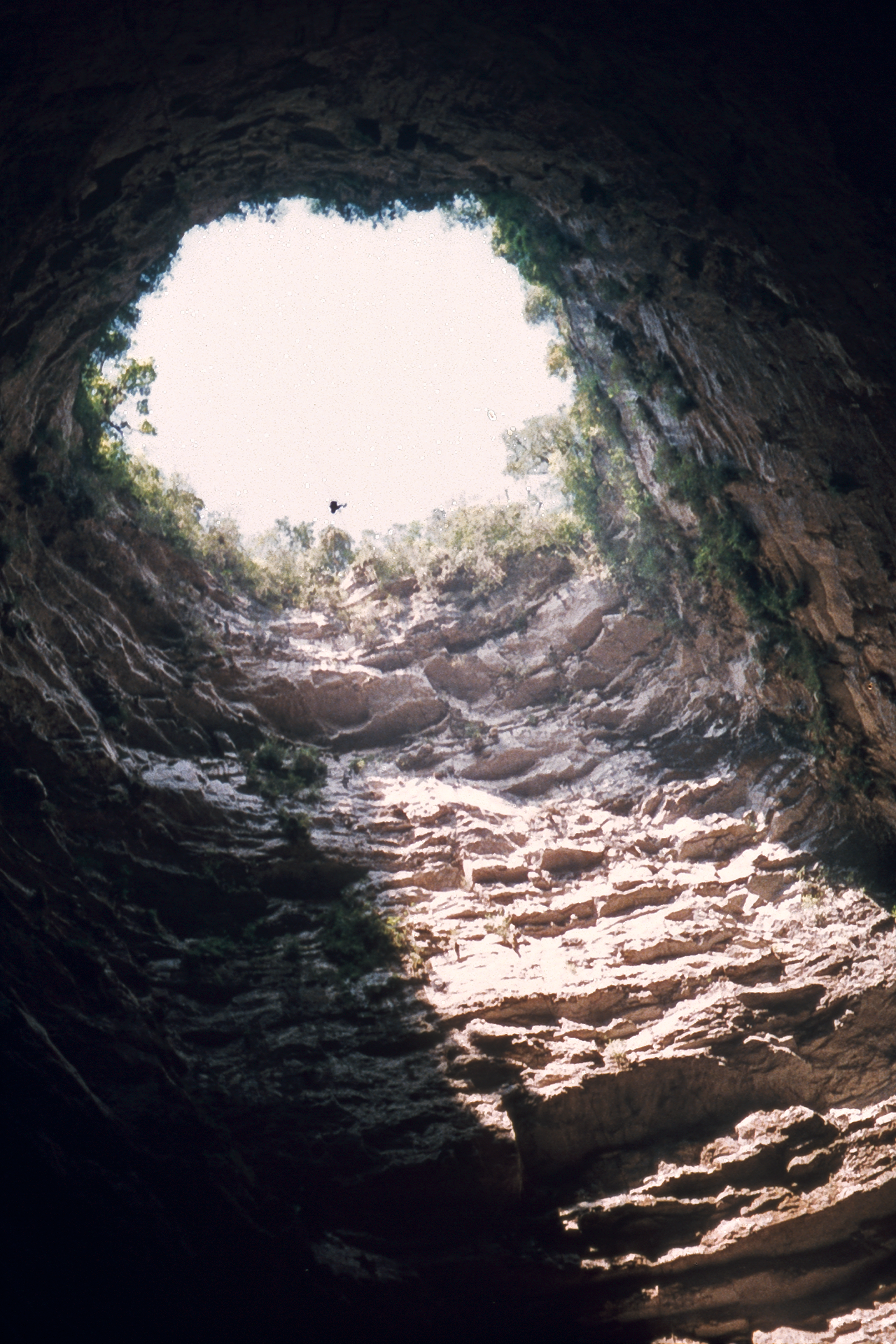
A caver rappels the drop from the cave's mouth.

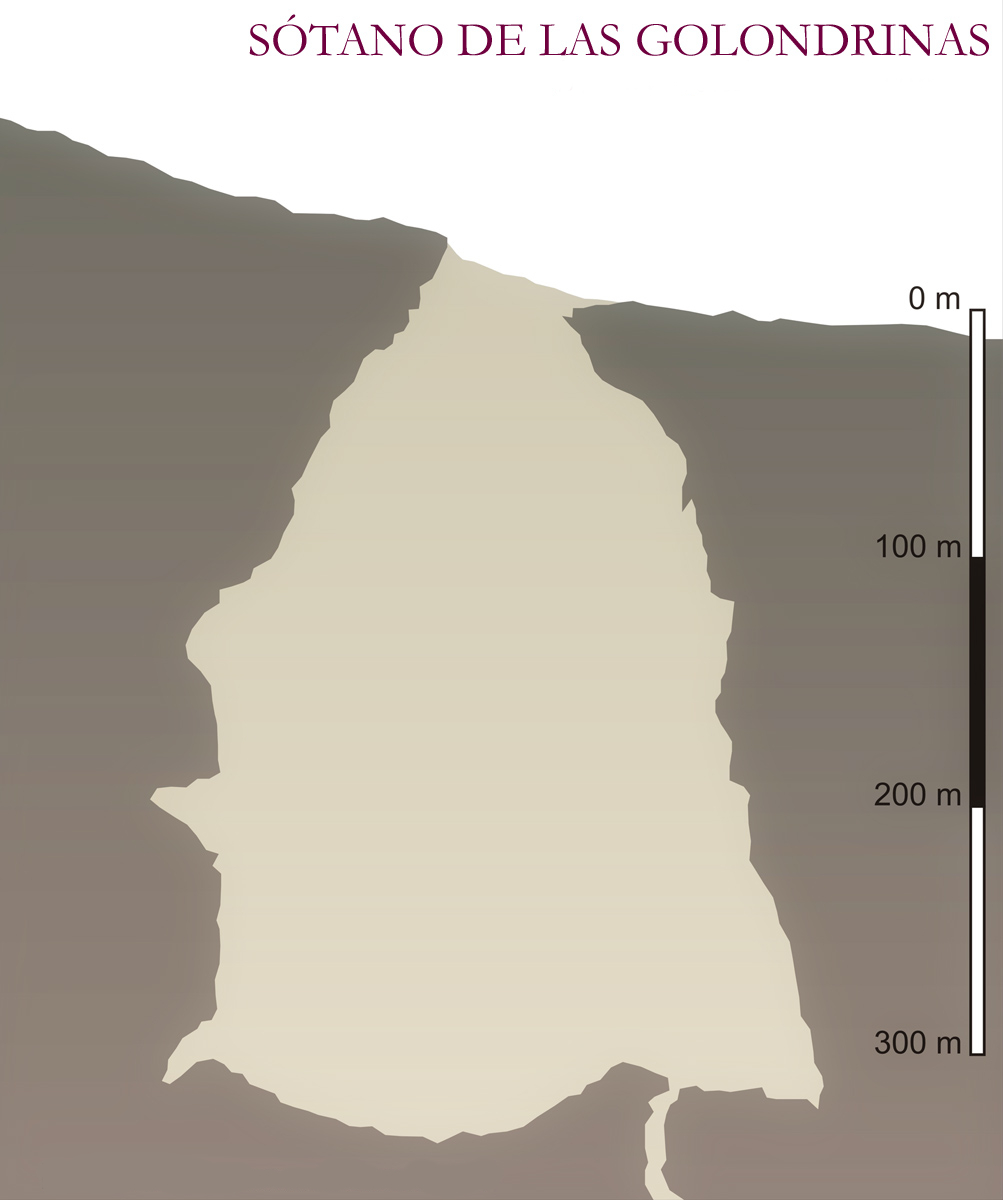
Cross section of the cave

The Cave of Swallows, also called the Cave of the Swallows (Spanish: Sótano de las Golondrinas), is an open-air pit cave in the municipality of Aquismón, San Luis Potosí, Mexico. The elliptical mouth, on a slope of karst, is 49 by 62 m (161 by 203 ft) wide and is undercut around all of its perimeter, widening to a room approximately 303 by 135 m (994 by 443 ft) wide. The floor of the cave is a 333 m (1,093 ft) freefall drop from the lowest side of the opening, with a 370 m (1,210 ft) drop from the highest side, making it the largest known cave shaft in the world, the second deepest pit in Mexico and perhaps the 11th deepest sheer drop in the world. (Note: Wikipedia's list of deepest caves uses different criteria, not sheer drop but accessibility.)

== History ==
The cave has been known to the local Huastec people since ancient times. T. R. Evans, Charles Borland, Randy Sterns, and Sid West were first shown the cave on 27 December 1966. The first documented descent was on 4 April 1967.

== Geology ==
The cave is formed in the El Abra and Tamabra formations, limestones of Middle Cretaceous age. The cave's speleogenesis is still not fully known but is a result of solutional enlargement along a vertical fracture, with subsequent vadose enlargement.

== Etymology ==
The cave's Spanish name Sótano de las Golondrinas means Basement of the Swallows, owing to the many birds which live in holes on the cave walls. These are mostly white-collared swifts (vencejos in Spanish) and green parakeets (periquillo quila). Actual swallows are in fact rarely found here.

Each morning, flocks of birds exit the cave by flying in concentric circles, gaining height until they reach the entrance. In the evenings a large flock of swifts circles the mouth of the cave and about once each minute, a group of perhaps 50 breaks off and heads straight down toward the opening. When they cross the edge, the birds pull in their wings and free-fall, extending their wings and pulling out of the dive when they reach the heights of their nests. Watching this has become popular with tourists.

== Description ==
Temperatures in the cave are low. Vegetation grows thickly at the mouth, The cave floor is covered with a thick layer of debris and guano. The fungi in the guano may cause histoplasmosis in humans. The cave floor and walls are inhabited by millipedes, scorpions, insects, snakes and birds. From the floor at the bottom of the main shaft, there is a series of narrow pits known as "The Crevice", totalling some 140 m (460 ft), which brings the total depth of the cave to 515 m (1,690 ft).

== Extreme sports tourism ==
The cave is a popular vertical caving destination. Cavers anchor their ropes on the low side, where bolts have been installed in the rock and the area is clear of obstructions. Rappelling to the floor can take up to an hour. Climbing back out may take from forty minutes to more than two hours. A person without a parachute would take almost ten seconds to freefall from the mouth to the floor; hence, the pit is also popular with extreme sports enthusiasts for BASE jumping.

== See also ==
- Cenote, the term for similar caves found in the Yucatan Peninsula of Mexico
- List of caves
- List of sinkholes of Mexico
