= Pozzo del Merro =

Flooded sinkhole in the countryside northeast of Rome, Italy

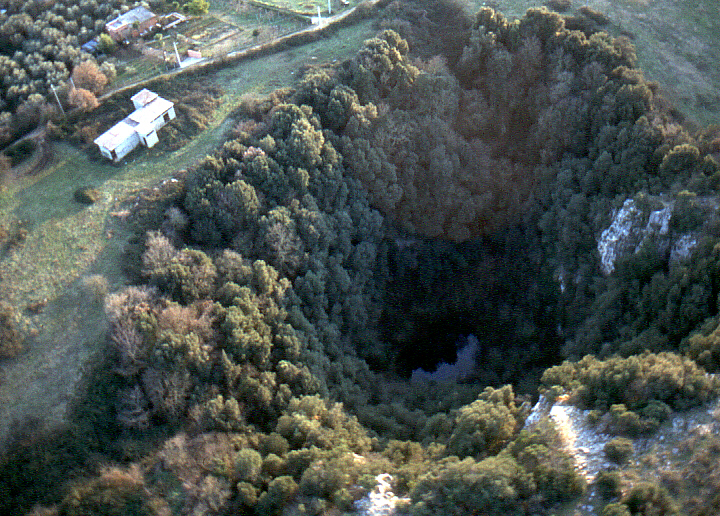
- Interactive map of Pozzo del Merro
- Location: Sant'Angelo Romano, Lazio, Italy
- Coordinates: 42.039298°N 12.680456°E
- Depth: c. 392 m

Pozzo del Merro is a flooded sinkhole in the countryside northeast of Rome, Italy. Situated at the bottom of an 80 m conical pit, at 392 m (1,286 ft) it is the second deepest underwater vertical cave in the world. In 2000 two ROVs were sent to explore its depths; the first, the "Mercurio (Mercury)" reached its maximum operative depth of 210 m (690 ft) without reaching the bottom. The second ROV, "Hyball 300", reached 310 m (1,020 ft) without touching down either. A third dive in 2002 with the more advanced "Prometeo" robot reached the bottom at 392 m (1,286 ft), but discovered a narrow passage continuing horizontally.

The sinkhole, similar to the Zacatón cenote, was formed by volcanic activity eroding the carbonate rock.

The sinkhole is part of the natural reserve Macchia di Gattaceca e Macchia del Barco (created in 1997).
