= Figure 8 (climbing) =

Device for rappelling

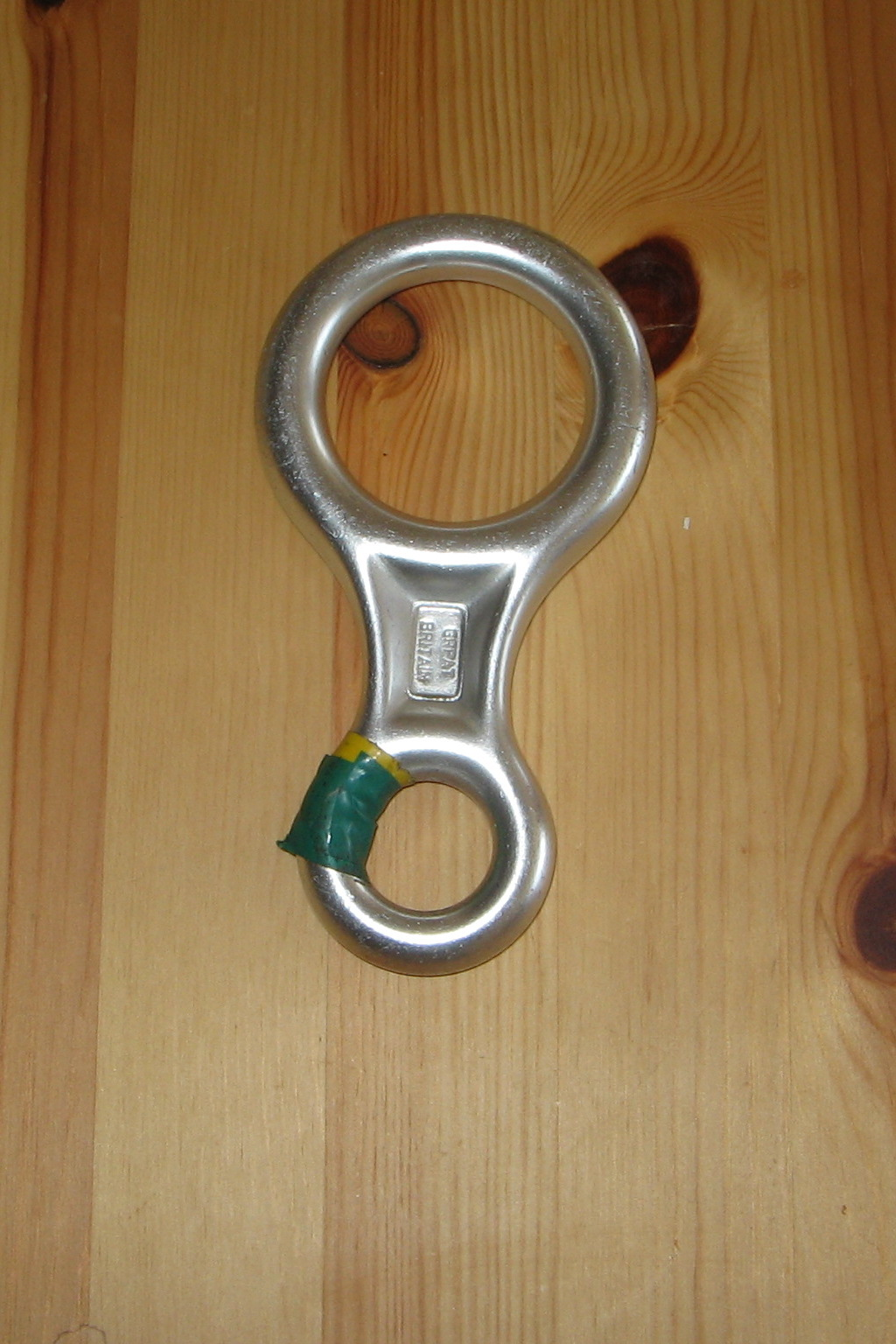
A figure-eight descender

The figure 8 belay device is a piece of metal (usually an aluminum alloy) in the shape of an 8 with one large end and one small end.

== Usage ==
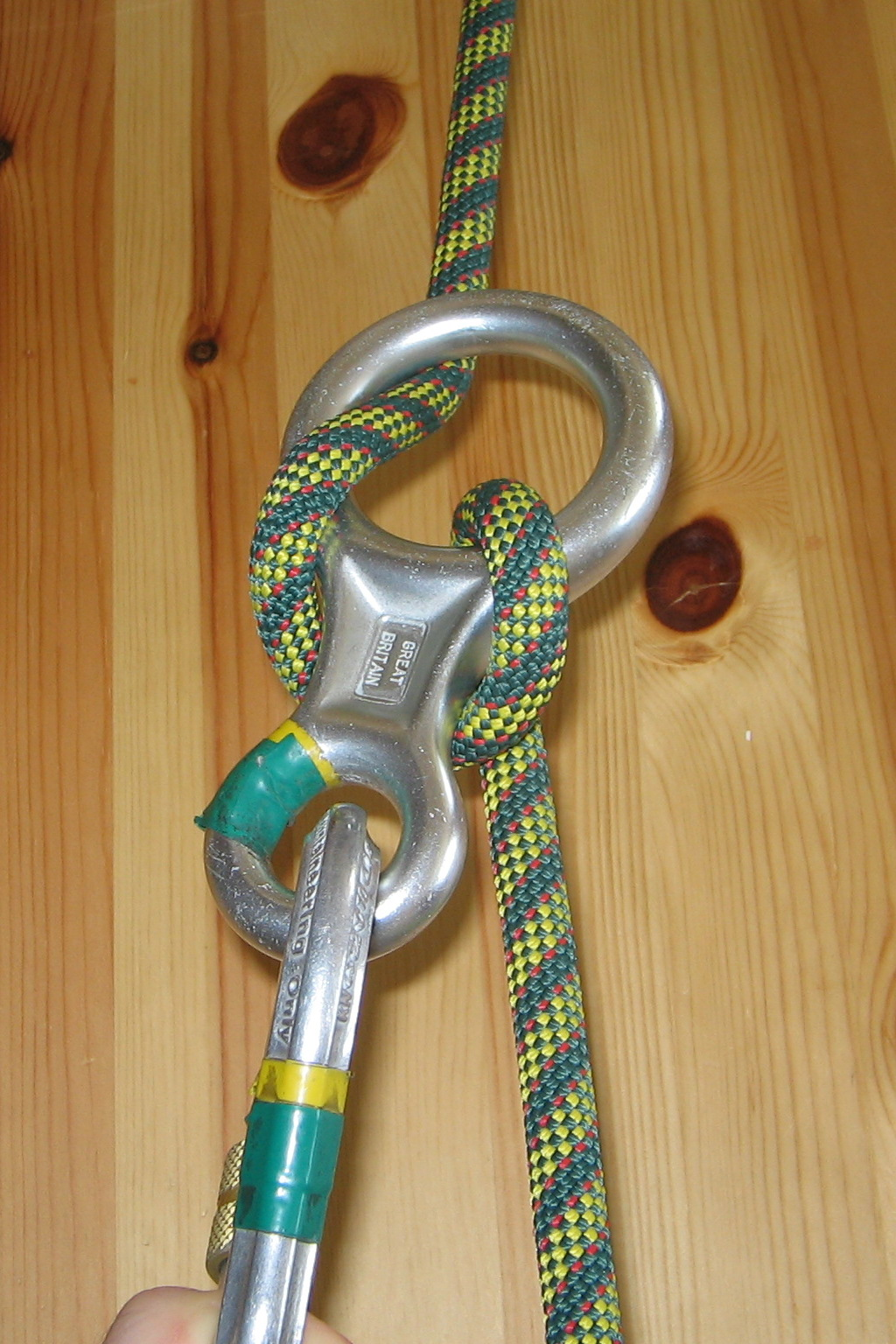
High friction rope position

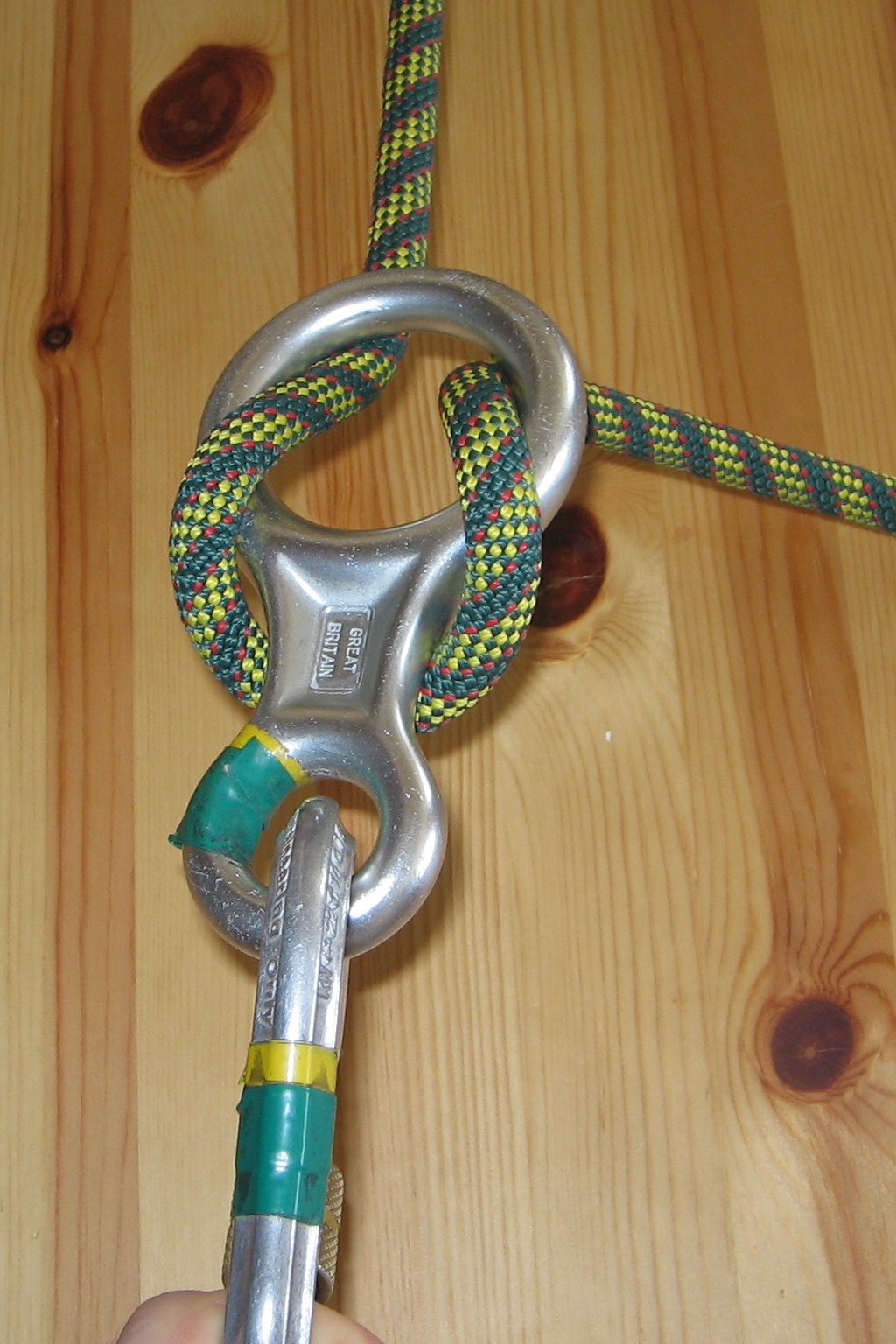
Low friction rope position

This device utilizes a large surface area in contact with a climbing rope to provide sufficient friction along with the proper technique to be used as a belay device or for rappelling. A figure 8 (sometimes just referred to as an 8) is used in conjunction with a climbing harness and locking carabiner to control a belayed climber's descent, or one's own descent when rappelling.

== Pros ==
Figure-eights offer a smooth controlled descent when rappelling and lowering climbers. They can be used with nearly any diameter climbing rope and don't get as hot as other friction devices because of their ability to dissipate heat efficiently. The figure eight can also be used with a doubled rope, which is also possible with a rack but not a bobbin.

== Cons ==
Although it can be used with nearly any diameter climbing rope, there is not sufficient friction with modern thin ropes (typically anything under 9.5mm) in standard configuration. The figure-eight cannot be removed from the rope without detaching the device from the harness, and so could be accidentally dropped, particularly when tackling a rebelay. They also twist the rope which is a particular problem where a rebelay prevents the rope from untwisting. They do not provide a convenient means to temporarily lock the descent at a rebelay.

== Bibliography ==
- Cox, Steven M. and Kris Fulsaas, ed., ed. (2003–09). Mountaineering: The Freedom of the Hills (7 ed.). Seattle: The Mountaineers. ISBN 0-89886-828-9.
