= Rappel rack =

Climbing and caving equipment

Rappel racks, also known as abseil racks, are a type of descender. They are often used in caving, where they are valued for their versatility and excellent friction control. Though similar designs have been in use since at least 1876, the modern rack was developed independently by both John Cole and Warren Lewis, who both released their designs in 1969. The basic design used in modern racks remains much the same as the ones designed in 1969.

== Uses and operation ==
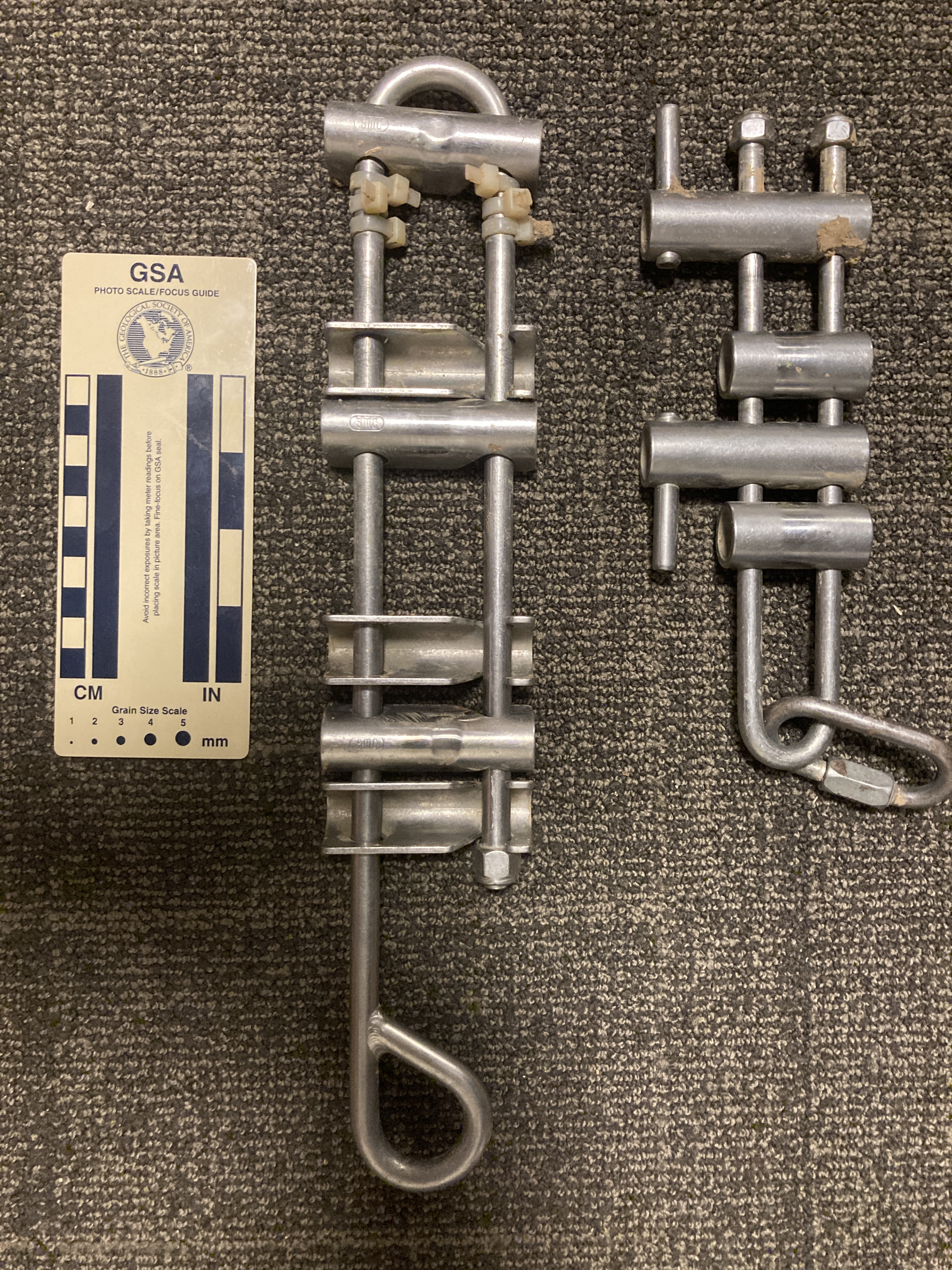
Comparison between two types of racks

Racks are favored by many American cavers for the excellent friction control and above average heat dissipation they offer. This heat dissipation is improved further if aluminum bars are used. They have other several advantages over bobbins including the ability to use them with more than one rope at a time, and over a larger distribution of pitch lengths. However, bobbin abseiling devices, being easier to lock off, easier to transfer mid-pitch, and lighter to carry, are more popular in Europe where Alpine rigging techniques are used.

Racks function by holding the rope in-between metal bars to create friction. A hand held on the rope beneath the device, in conjunction with control of the distance between bars, controls the rate of descent.

Racks carry a set of safety risks that are not associated with other styles of descender. The most dangerous of these is the "suicide rig", a configuration that will cause the bars to pop off of the rope, and potentially allow the user to fall. This occurs when the rope is threaded in such a way that the rope forces the bars open, instead of holding them closed.
