= Vrtiglavica =

Cave in Slovenia

- Location within Slovenia
- Location: Plužna, Bovec, Slovenia
- Coordinates: 46°20′12″N 13°28′2″E
- Depth: 643 m (2,110 ft)
- Length: 643 m (2,110 ft)
- Elevation: 1,900 m (6,200 ft)
- Discovery: 1996
- Entrances: 1
- Access: open cave with free entrance

Vrtiglavica, also Vrtoglavica (both from Slovene vrtoglavica 'vertigo'), is a karst shaft on the Kanin Plateau, part of the Kanin Mountains, Western Julian Alps, on the Slovene side of the border between Slovenia and Italy. It has the deepest known pitch in the world, at 603 metres (1,978 ft). The cave formed in a glaciokarst landscape; that is, a karst landscape that was subjected to Pleistocene glacial activity.

Plunging straight through the high-karst roof of the Kanin Plateau at 1,900 m above sea-level, Vrtiglavica is no labyrinth but a single, near-cylindrical shaft that falls the cave's entire surveyed depth of 643 m. Glacial scouring during the Pleistocene stripped away the plateau's soil cover and enlarged pre-existing fissures, allowing melt-water to dissolve the crystalline Dachstein limestone along a tight joint bundle and sculpt the current glaciokarst pipe. Because the lip of the entrance opens directly onto bare karst pavement, rain and seasonal snowmelt drop unhindered into the void, creating a mist-filled freefall that is audible for several hundred metres around the doline rim.

Rope work inside the shaft is dominated by a record-breaking 603 m-uninterrupted pitch—the longest underground abseil yet measured anywhere on Earth. A lone rebelay at 358 m perches on a chock-stone half-way down; otherwise cavers descend in one continuous hang to a breakdown chamber 71 × 37 m wide whose floor is usually strewn with ice pellets even in summer. The same vertical profile feeds one of Europe's most spectacular underground streams: surface run-off disappears at the entrance and re-emerges part-way down as spray and rivulets, then sinks again into rubble and is believed to resurge kilometres away at the Boka karst springs. Although its total length is identical to its depth, Vrtiglavica is part of a dense Kanin network that contains more than 300 catalogued caves within 8 km^{2} of terrain; field manuals of the Slovene Cave Rescue Service cite the shaft, alongside Patkov Gušt in Croatia, as a textbook example of high-mountain vertical karst hazards.

Access is technically unrestricted—there are no fixed ladders, gate, or permit system—but local guides stress that only well-equipped teams experienced in single-rope technique should attempt the descent. The Soča Valley outdoor portal labels Vrtiglavica "the cave with the world's deepest single vertical drop" and lists its surveyed dimensions (length = depth = 643 m), underscoring its draw for international big-drop specialists.
