= Petzl Stop =

Descender used in caving

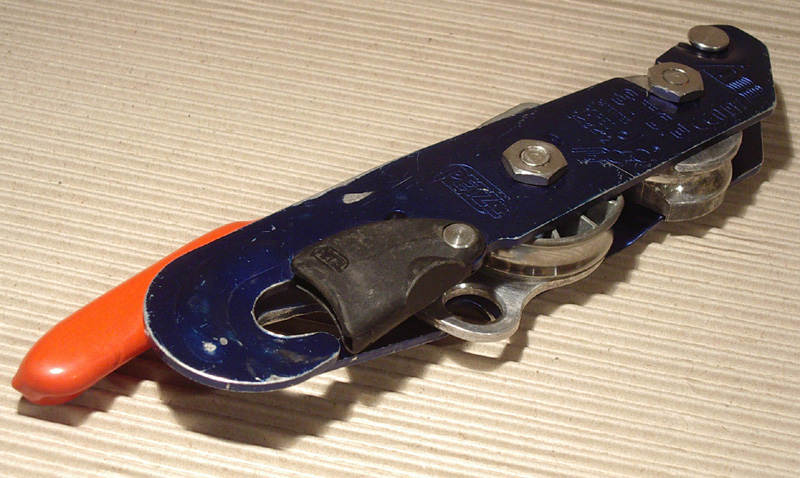
A Petzl Stop descender. The dead man's handle is visible in red.

A Petzl Stop is a bobbin descender used primarily in caving and formerly used for industrial rope access made by the French company Petzl.

== Usage ==
The Stop is for use with single low stretch kernmantle ropes and is usually attached to the harness via a carabiner. The rope is then threaded through the cam and bobbin by undoing the safety clip and moving the swinging side plate to the side. The swinging side plate facilitates insertion and removal of the rope without the need to disconnect it from the harness, making it less likely to be dropped while inserting and removing the rope from the Stop while at height. As the Stop is a self-braking descender, an unintentional release of the handle should stop the descent, due to the asymmetric lower cam crimping the rope. This functionality safeguards the user in the event of being knocked unconscious due to a rockfall or illness, though the fine control of rate of descent should be carried out by standard method of manually controlling friction with the hand on the rope below the descender.

A simpler version of the bobbin descender, without the stop handle, is also available.

== Versions ==
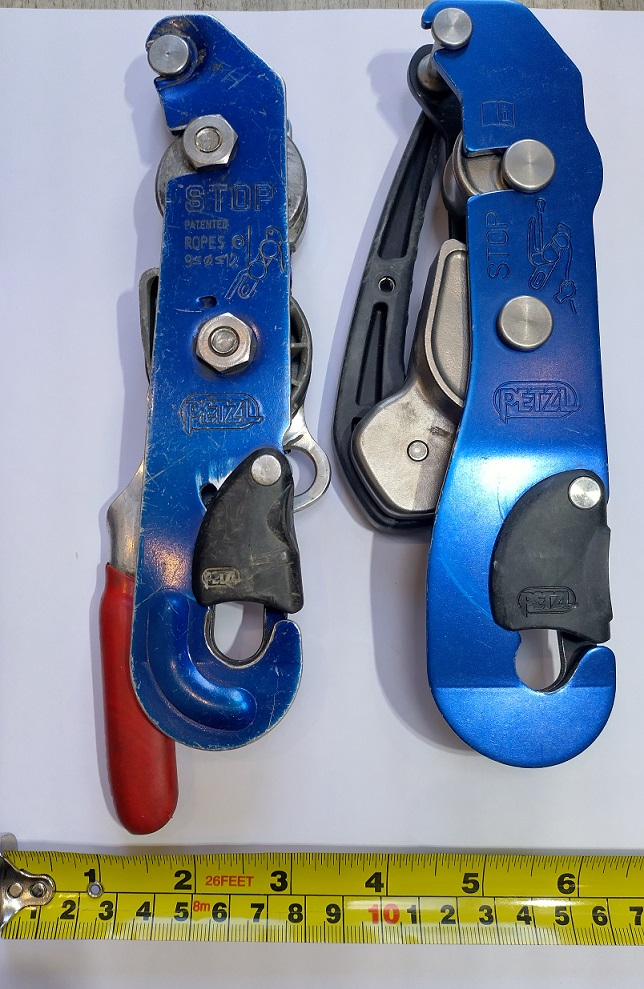
Original Left, 2019 Right

=== Original Version ===
- Rope compatibility: 9 to 12 mm low stretch kernmantle rope
- Replaceable aluminium bobbins (main bobbin with stainless insert)
- Carabiner slot that can accept normal carabiners and Petzl Freino braking carabiner
- Short squeeze handle made from metal with red plastic cover
- Ability to lock out the handle for one handed descents

=== 2019 Version ===
The Stop was updated for sale in 2019 replacing the original version. Changes to the design including updates to the handle, the bobbins and the carabiner slot. This version also saw Petzl shift the intended use of the Stop to recreational only use. The 2019 version of the Stop is no longer certified for Industrial use and Petzl now sell products such as the Petzl Rig and Petzl I'D S for Industrial use instead.

- Rope compatibility: 8.5 to 11 mm low stretch kernmantle rope
- Fixed stainless steel bobbins
- Wider carabiner slot to allow Petzl Freino Z braking carabiner to be rotated through it to reduce the chances of being drop when clipping between a gear loop and harness abseil point
- Redesigned pull handle using a black plastic folding handle that is longer than the original non folding one and providing leverage

== Standards ==
=== Original Version ===
- EN 341 class A
- CE 0197

=== 2019 Version ===
- CE EN 15151-1, UKCA
