= Rope access =

Form of industrial climbing

Forms of rope access

Window cleaning Portside Tower

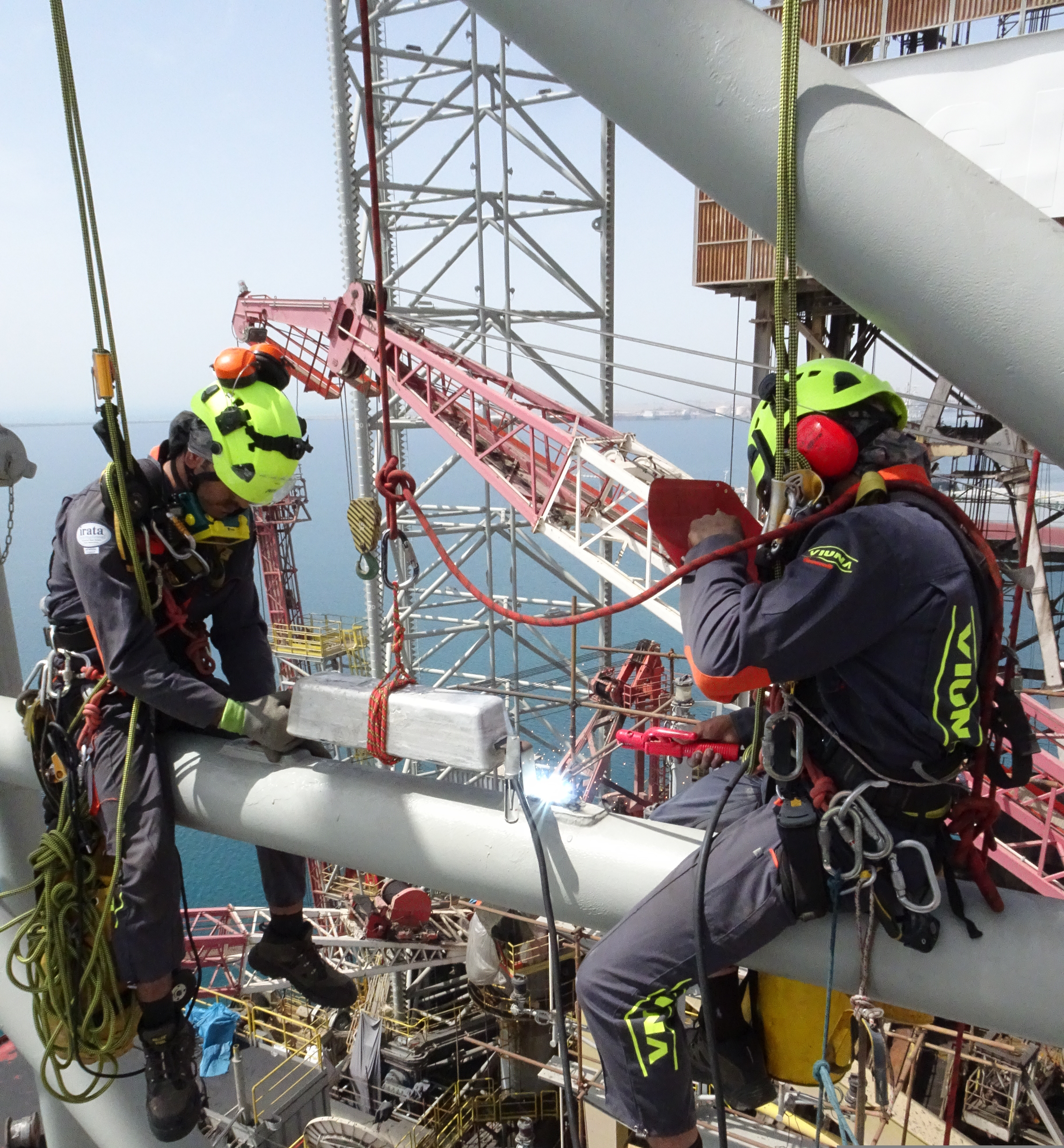
Repairing on oil platforms and rigs in Iran

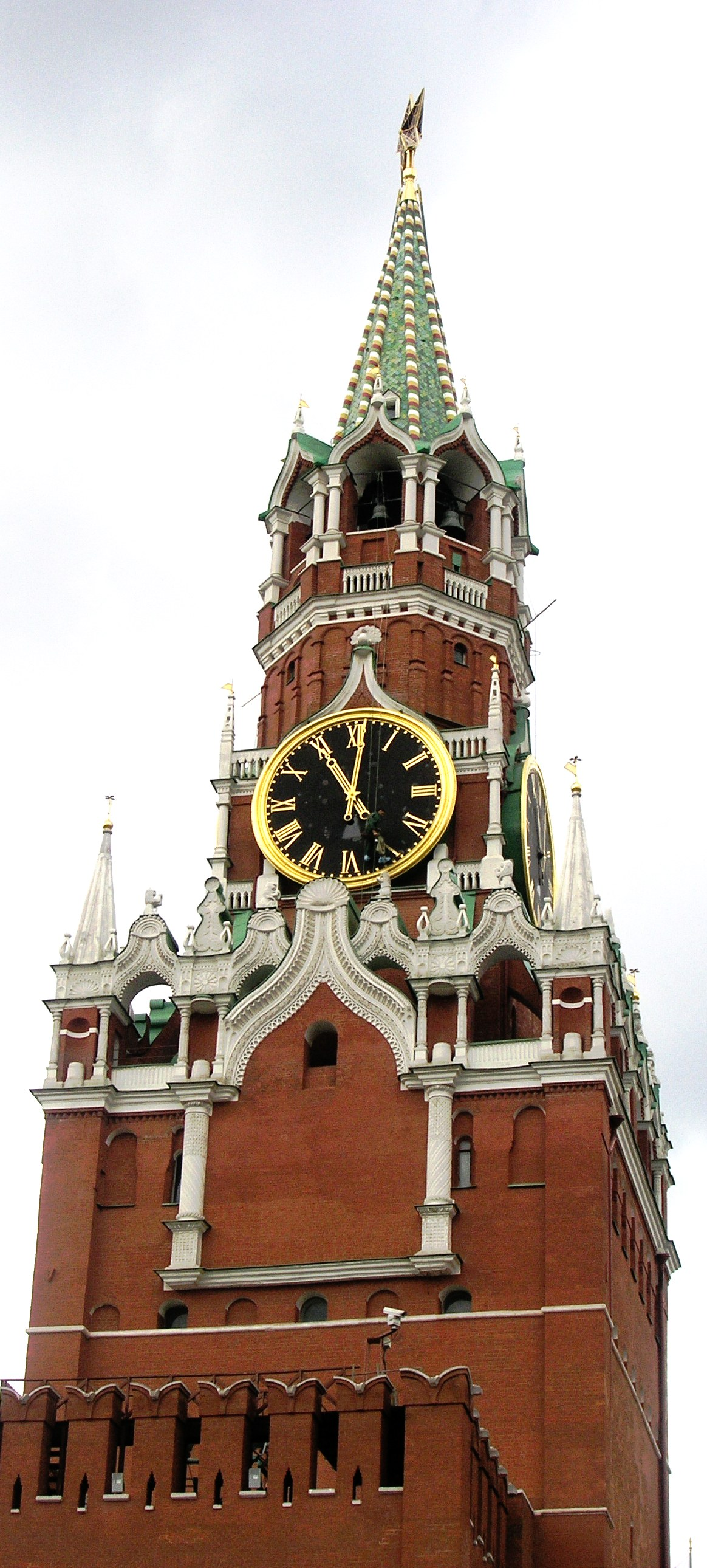
Cleaning a clock

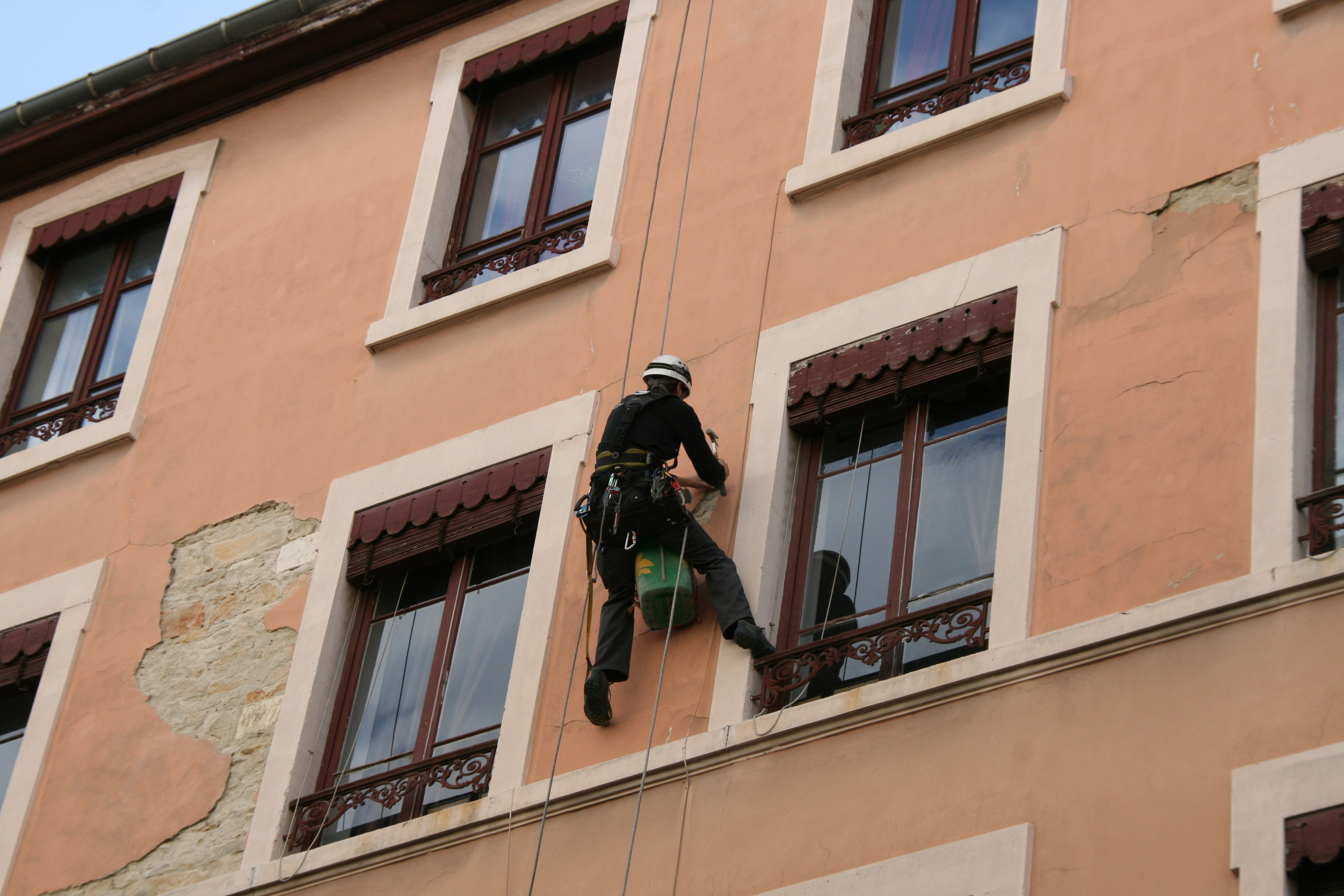
Carrying out maintenance work on the facade of a building

Rope access, also known as industrial climbing and commercial climbing, is a form of work positioning (a safety method used when working at height). Rope access originates from techniques found in climbing, big wall climbing in particular, and in caving, and includes abseiling, jumaring and building anchorpoints and platforms in exposed high places. These methods apply practical ropework techniques that allow a worker access to difficult to reach areas, with the use of scaffolding, cradles or an aerial work platform. Rope access makes working in vertical settings easier and more efficient.

Rope access training is regulated by the Industrial Rope Access Trade Association (IRATA) and the society of Professional Rope Access Technicians (SPRAT). Organizations such as the Rigging International Group, Quality Companies, RAM access, and others, offer in-house Rope Access courses. These courses are run by IRATA and SPRAT certified instructors and allow technicians to choose whether they want a certification in IRATA, SPRAT, or both.

Rope access technicians descend, ascend, and traverse fixed rope systems to access and work in a suspended state. Equipment includes a rope and harness, and in some situations a more elaborate 'work seat' is used. The rope and harness are used to support the worker by eliminating the risk of a fall, backup fall arrest systems (personal protective equipment) are used in case of a failure in the primary support system. The main rope and harness use a 'working line' and the secondary fall arrest system use a 'safety line'.

Industries where rope access is commonly used include the Oil & Gas, Wind, Aerospace, Power Generation, and Chemical. Rope access in the Oil & Gas industry speeds up the process of reaching elevated areas, by removing the need to build structures to work from; rope access is commonly used to do Non-Destructive Testing (NDT), Corrosion assessment and surface preparation, Weld inspections and structural repairs at height, and installation and maintenance of offshore safety systems. The Chemical industry uses rope access in similar applications, due to the vertical nature of refineries and plants. Rope access in used in these applications to reduce the time for set-up.

== See also ==
- Fixed rope
