= Double knot =

Double knot refers to a knot wound twice. See:

- Double anchorman knot
- Double coin knot
- Double constrictor knot
- Double fisherman's knot
- Double overhand knot
- Double torus knot
- Double windsor
- Karash double loop
