= Fisherman's knot =

Type of knot

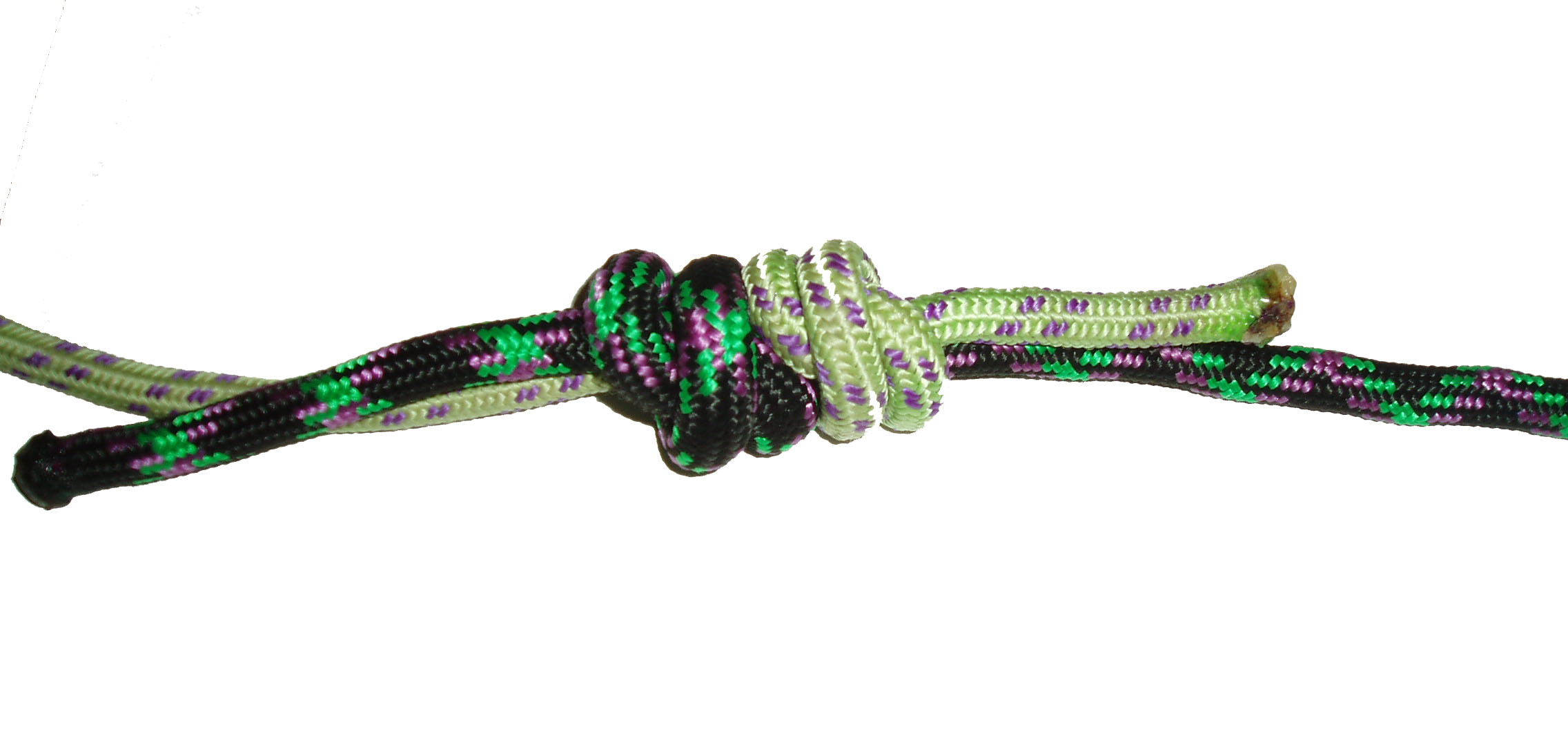
- A double fisherman's knot
- Names: Fisherman's knot, Waterman's knot, Angler's knot, (double) Englishman's knot, True lover's knot
- Category: Bend
- Origin: Ancient
- Related: Overhand knot, Double overhand knot
- Releasing: Jamming
- Typical use: Joining lines
- Caveat: Difficult or impossible to untie after loading
- ABoK: Single fisherman's: #293, #1414 & #1039; Double fisherman's: #294, #1415 & #498

The fisherman's knot is a knot—specifically a bend—that joins two lines. The double fisherman's knot and triple fisherman's knot are variations used in climbing, arboriculture, and search and rescue. The knot is also commonly used in fishing and medicine. The difference between the three variations is the number of turns in the overhand knots that form the completed bend.

The bend consists of two overhand knots in their strangle knot form, each tied around the standing end of the other. For the double fisherman's variation a double overhand knot is used, while the triple variation adds a third turn. The knot is generally known for its strength.

== History ==
The fisherman's knot and its variations developed independently in multiple distinct cultures. The knot was described by Heraklas in the first century as part of an essay on knots for surgical and orthopedic uses. Multiple turn variants of the fisherman's knot have been used by Inuit peoples fishing with lines made of baleen. These methods work because of the monofilament nature of the material, which could cause slippage in modern nylon materials. Triple fisherman's knots made in baleen found near Nuuk have been carbon dated to 1700. Single fisherman's knots have been identified among the knots found at the 4500 year old Qeqertasussuk site of the Saqqaq culture.

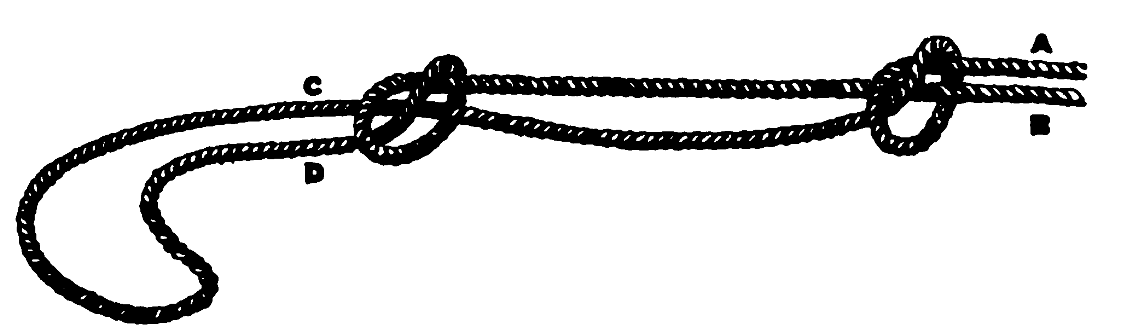
Diagram of a Fisherman's knot creating a loop

In 1865 the Alpine Club Journal reported on tests conducted on knots in a Manila rope. They found that while all knots weaken ropes, the fisherman's knot did so least of all the knots tested. The journal published details on the use of the knot in a loop as shown in the diagram. (Note: This form of the fisherman's knot in a loop knot is knot #1039 in Ashley's book of Knots, where it is called the "Improved Englishman's knot", on p. 189.) Hereford Brooke George wrote of the knot that he did not "wish to maintain the absolute superiority of this knot over all others, though I have never found one so generally useful."

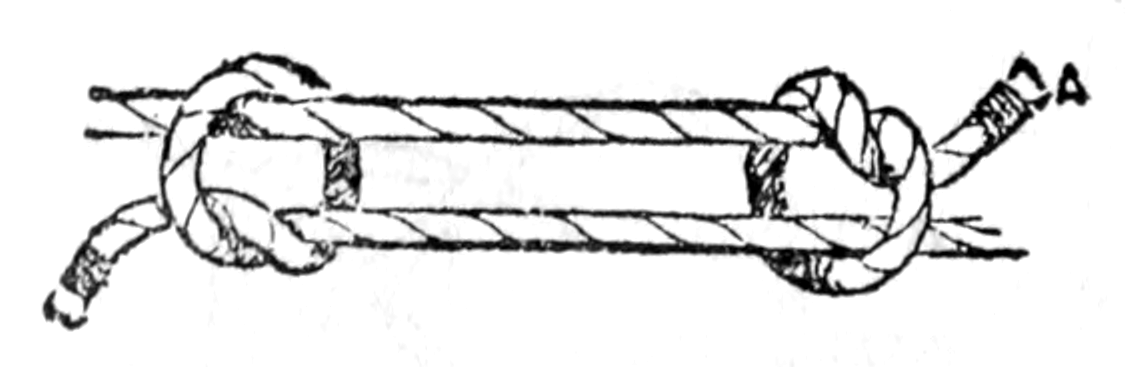
Diagram of a single fisherman's knot

The fisherman's knot and its variants have been known by various names. According to The Ashley Book of Knots, the fisherman's knot is known as the angler's knot, (double) English knot, halibut knot, waterman's knot, and true lover's knot. The double fisherman's knot is also known as a grapevine knot.

== Properties ==
All variations of the fisherman's knot jam when tightened. It can be difficult to untie especially after being well tightened or weighted. It is generally easier to untie a bend with fewer turns. The selection of the number of turns in the overhand knots needs to balance the security of the bend against the ease of untying it. While all knots weaken the material they are tied in, the fisherman's knot is commonly known for its strength. (Note: Most sources cite "strength" as the percentage of the full breaking strength of a material without knots in it that is maintained when knotted.)

The fisherman's knot can slip or come undone when using lines or ropes made of more slippery materials such as HMPE (also known as dyneema, or spectra) or nylon monofilament. In general, increasing the number of turns in the overhand knots increases the security of the completed bend.

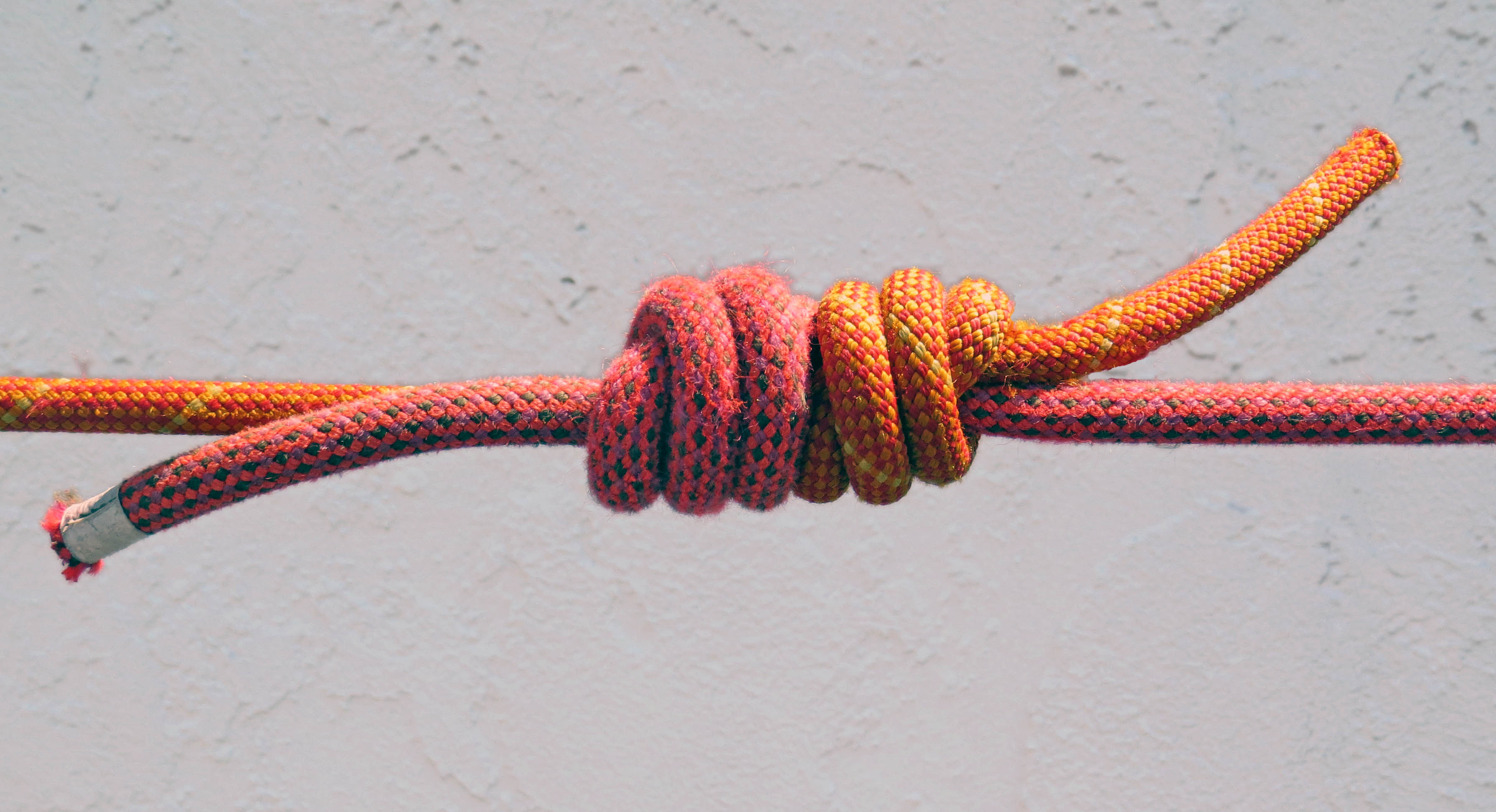
A triple fisherman's knot

In climbing, the triple fisherman's knot is recommended when using HMPE or aramid ropes. Testing has shown that a failure mode exists at high loads (generally higher than 15 kN) with the fisherman's knot in ropes using these materials in their core. The sheath of the rope separates at the knot, and the high-lubricity core slips through the fisherman's knot. This failure occurs at a slightly higher load in the triple fisherman's knot leading to the recommendation to use the triple fisherman's knot in these materials. It has also been shown that the knots hold in some types of webbing made of spectra or nylon and not just kernmantle ropes made of these materials.

The technique used in tying the knot is important to determining the behavior of the knot under load and its failure mode. The extent to which the overhand knots are tightened before use is crucial in determining the amount of friction in the system. When pulled until failure, the failure mode of the fisherman's knot either by the rope breaking or by a topological change (i.e., slipping), is dictated by a combination of the coefficient of friction between the rope strands, elastic stiffness, and the initial geometry. The balance of friction and elasticity determines how the knot tightens and whether it will slip or jam firmly.

Researchers have described loops tied with the knot as undergoing one of three processes when stretched depending on the properties of the material used. First, the overhand knots can slide along the standing ends of one another until they lock against each other, this is the common configuration for most uses. Second, the overhand knots can remain stationary and the system stretches, for example in very elastic materials with high coefficients of friction. Finally, the knotted structures can create elastic loads in the material and the knots untangle themselves, for example in stiff materials that resist knotting or very slippery materials with high elasticity.

== Uses ==
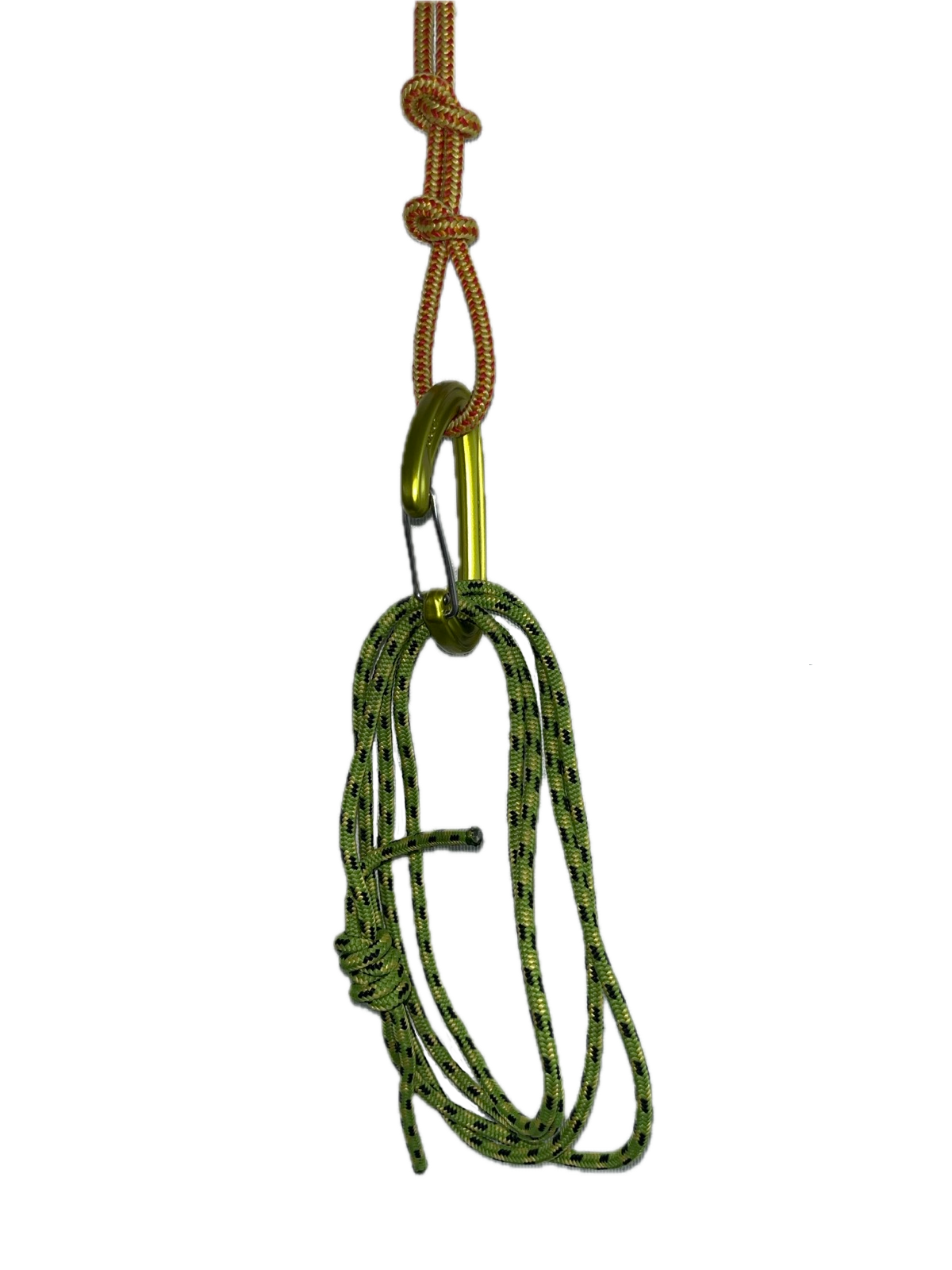
A cordelette tied into a loop with a double fisherman's knot hanging from a carabiner and a single fisherman's knot tied in a loop

The double and triple variants of the bend are common in climbing when tied using appropriate ropes or cord. A primary use of the knot in this context is creating closed loops (cordelettes) by connecting the ends of a piece of rope to each other. These cords can be used, for example, for tying a prusik hitch. These variants are also recommended by the International Commission for Alpine Rescue, either as primary bends or as backups, for extending ropes that are placed under rescue loads. The double fisherman's knot is not recommended for joining ropes where the ropes need to be pulled down and might get snagged in the terrain, such as canyoning.

All variations of the fisherman's knot are used in fishing, particularly the single overhand variant. Other knots sometimes provide superior performance for this application when using nylon lines, such as the blood knot.

In surgery, the fisherman's knot is used to repair broken sutures. Surgeons also use its loop form in laparoscopy as part of cinch knots.

The fisherman's knot is one of the true lover's knots that have been used in weddings as part of handfasting ceremonies. (Note: Ashley, 1993, p. 387, relates a story about the fisherman's knot with a loop as a true lovers knot, wherein a sailor waits for the knot to be returned to him by his lover with the overhand knots either apart, together, or capsized and undone.)

This knot can be used to join the ends of a necklace cord. The two strangle knots are left separated so that the length of the necklace can be adjusted without cutting or untying the cord.

== See also ==
- List of bends
- List of knots
