= Transom =

Transom may refer to:

- Transom (architecture), a bar of wood or stone across the top of a door or window, or the window above such a bar
- Transom (nautical), that part of the stern of a vessel where the two sides of its hull meet
- Operation Transom, a World War II bombing raid on Surabaya in Java
- Transom knot, a simple lashing knot
- Tug Transom, a British daily comic strip
