= Constrictor =

Constrictor may refer to:

== Biology ==
- Any snake that kills its prey by constriction
- A taxonomic synonym for Boa, also known as "boas", a genus of non-venomous boas found in Central and South America, Mexico and Madagascar
- A taxonomic synonym for Python, also known as "pythons", a genus of non-venomous pythons found in Africa and Asia

== Other uses ==
- Constrictor (album), a 1986 album by Alice Cooper
- Constrictor (character), a supervillain/hero in the Marvel Comics universe
- Constrictor knot, a binding knot
- Pharyngeal constrictor, one of the muscles that serves to constrict the pharynx
