= Strangle knot =

Simple binding knot

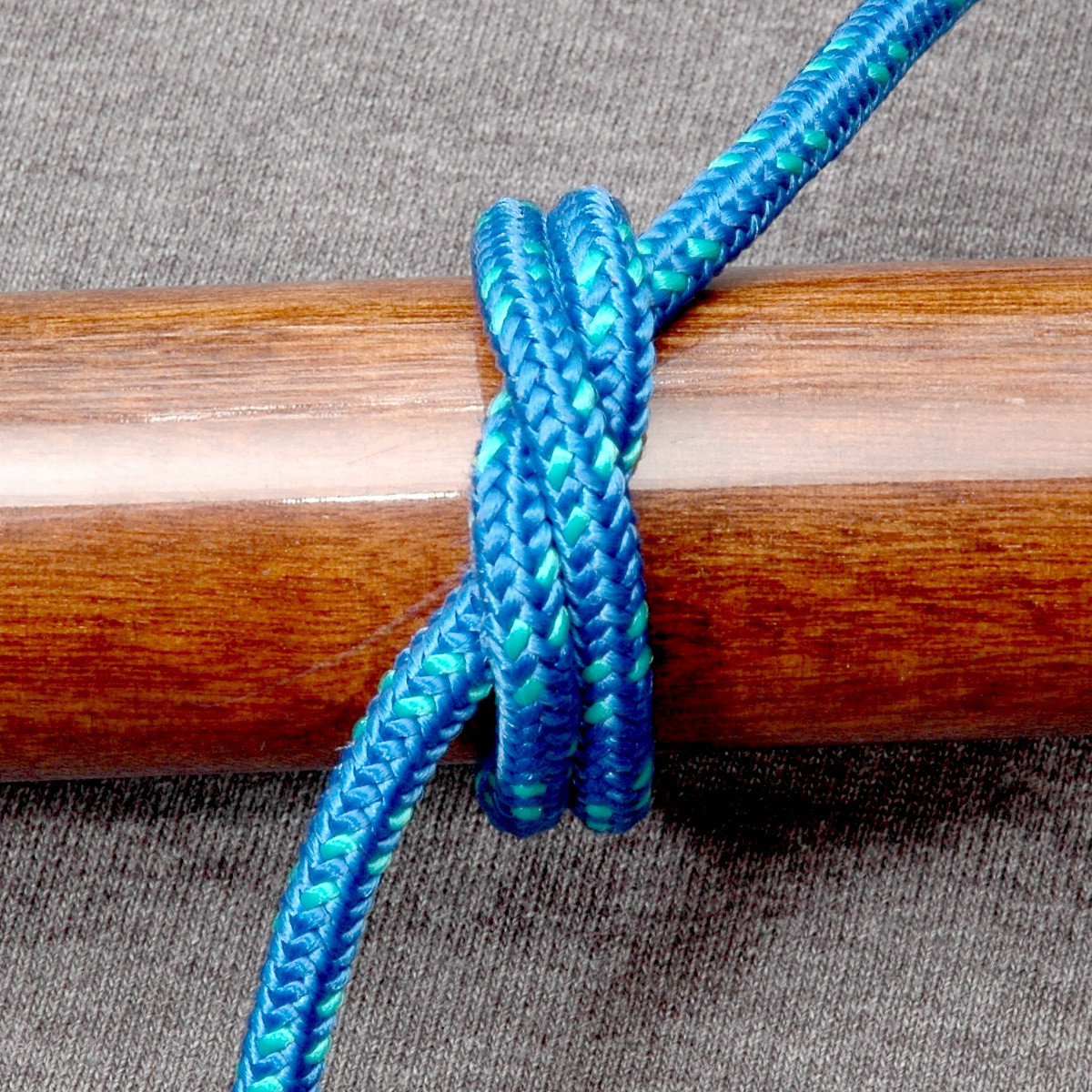
- Category: Binding
- Related: Double overhand knot, Constrictor knot, Double fisherman's knot, Transom knot
- ABoK: #1239

The strangle knot is a simple binding knot. Similar to the constrictor knot, it also features an overhand knot under a riding turn. A visible difference is that the ends emerge at the outside edges, rather than between the turns as for a constrictor. This knot is a rearranged double overhand knot and makes up each half of the double fisherman's knot.

The strangle knot starts with a round turn and the end is stuck under two parts. It may be used to tie up a roll. It can only be tied around a cylindrical shape. If required, a loop may be stuck instead of the end, which makes a slipped knot that is one of the best for tying up sacks and meal bags. With one or two additional turns the strangle knot makes an excellent temporary whipping for the end of a rope.

— The Ashley Book of Knots

== See also ==
- List of binding knots
- List of knots
- Clove hitch in comparison
- Transom knot
