= Turn (knot) =

Type of knot

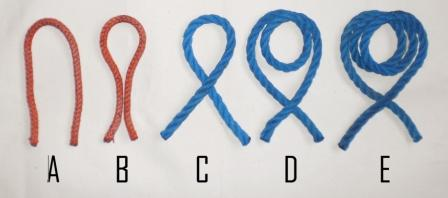
A: An open loop. B: A closed loop C: Turn or single turn D: Round turn E: Two round turns

A turn is one round of rope on a pin or cleat, or one round of a coil. Turns can be made around various objects, through rings, or around the standing part of the rope itself or another rope. A turn also denotes a component of a knot.

When the legs of a loop are brought together and crossed, the rope has taken a turn. One distinguishes between single turn, round turn, and two round turns depending on the number of revolutions around an object. The benefit of round turns is best understood from the capstan equation.

== Riding turn ==
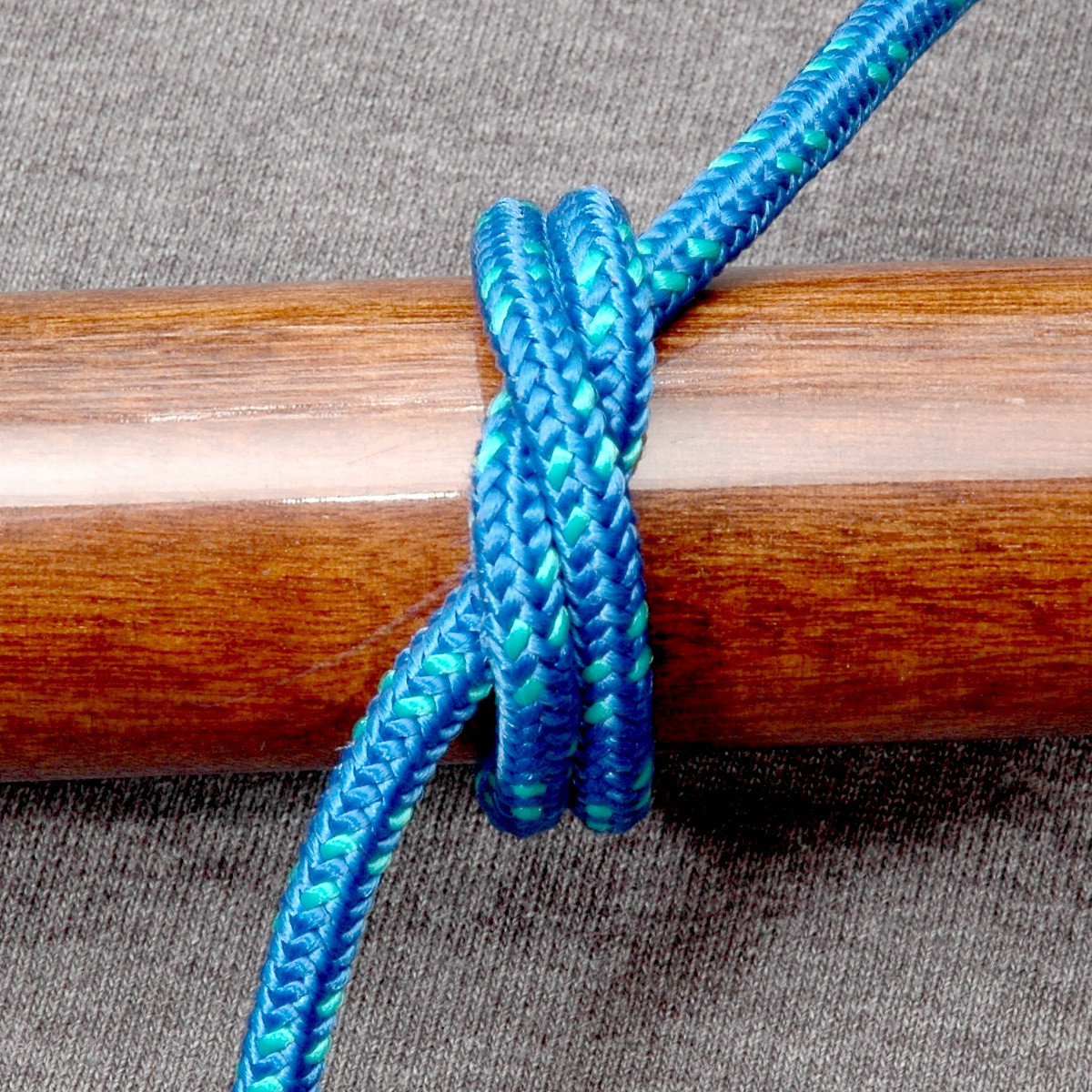
The riding turn of this strangle knot passes from the upper left to lower right

A riding turn is a section of rope that passes on top of another section of rope, often parallel or at only a slight angle to the section below. Examples of riding turns can be seen in both the constrictor knot and the strangle knot. The second course of wrappings in some seizing knots can be referred to as riding turns. The formation of an unintentional riding turn on a sailing winch can cause it to jam.

== Single hitch ==
Single hitch
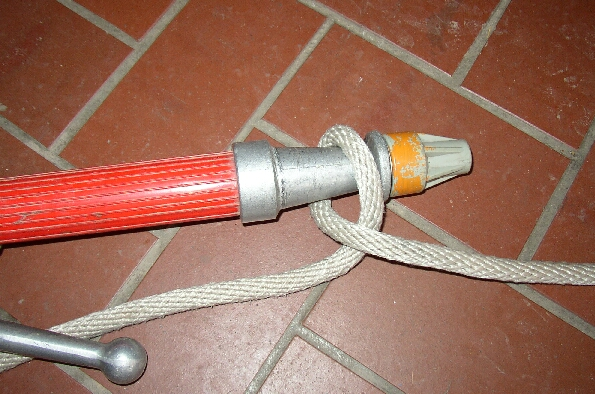
- Category: Hitch
- Origin: Ancient
- Related: half hitch
- Releasing: Non-jamming
- Typical use: Used effectively to form many other knots.
- Caveat: Spills, unreliable as a hitch used on its own.
- ABoK: #49

A single hitch is a type of knot. This hitch is actually a turn tied around an object where the end is secured by its own standing part.

== See also ==
- List of knots
