= Blood knot =

Type of bend knot

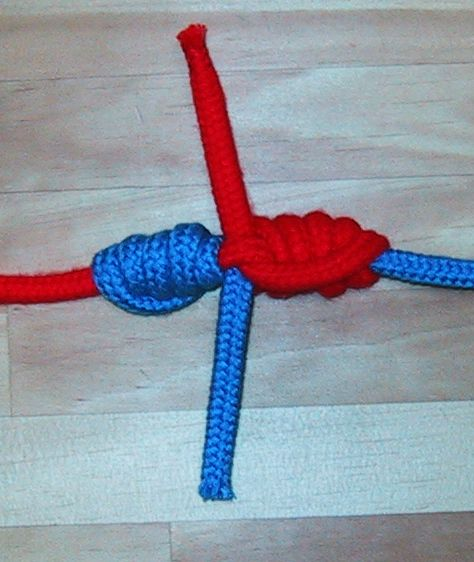
- Names: Blood knot, Barrel knot
- Category: Bend
- Efficiency: 80%
- Origin: Unknown
- Related: Improved clinch knot
- Releasing: Jamming
- Typical use: Tying fishing line, joining monofilament nylon line
- ABoK: #295, #345, #1413

A blood knot (barrel knot) is a bend knot most usefully employed for joining sections of monofilament nylon line while maintaining a high portion of the line's inherent strength. Other knots used for this purpose can cause a substantial loss of strength. In fly fishing, this serves to build a leader of gradually decreasing diameter with the castable fly line attached at the large diameter end and the fly or hook at the small diameter end. The principal drawback to the blood knot is the dexterity required to tie it. It is also likely to jam, which is not a concern in fishing line, which is no great loss to cut, but may pose a concern in normal rope. The term "blood knot" can also refer to "a double overhand knot tied in a cat-o'-nine-tails".

The barrel knot, called blood knot by Keith Rollo, is the best bend there is for small, stiff or slippery line. The ends may be trimmed short and the knot offers the least resistance possible when drawn through water.

— The Ashley Book of Knots

A half blood knot (also clinch knot) is a knot that is used for securing a fishing line to a fishing lure, snap or swivel. When two half blood knots are used to join two lines, they are considered as one knot and called a blood knot. A half blood knot is one of the strongest knots for tying a medium-size hook to a medium-size line such as hooksize 4 to 4/0 onto line size 6–30 lb (2.7–13.6 kg).

The half blood knot has found use in surgery for securing slippery monofilament sutures.

== Tying the knot ==
In tying the blood knot, the two lines to be joined are overlapped for 6–8 cm (2.4–3.1 in) with the short ends of the two lines in opposite directions. The short end of one line is then wrapped 4–6 times around the second line and the remaining portion of the first short end brought back and passed between the lines at the beginning of the wraps. The short end of the second line is then wrapped 4–6 times around the first line and the end of this line brought back and passed through what is now an oval space between the first wrap of each set.

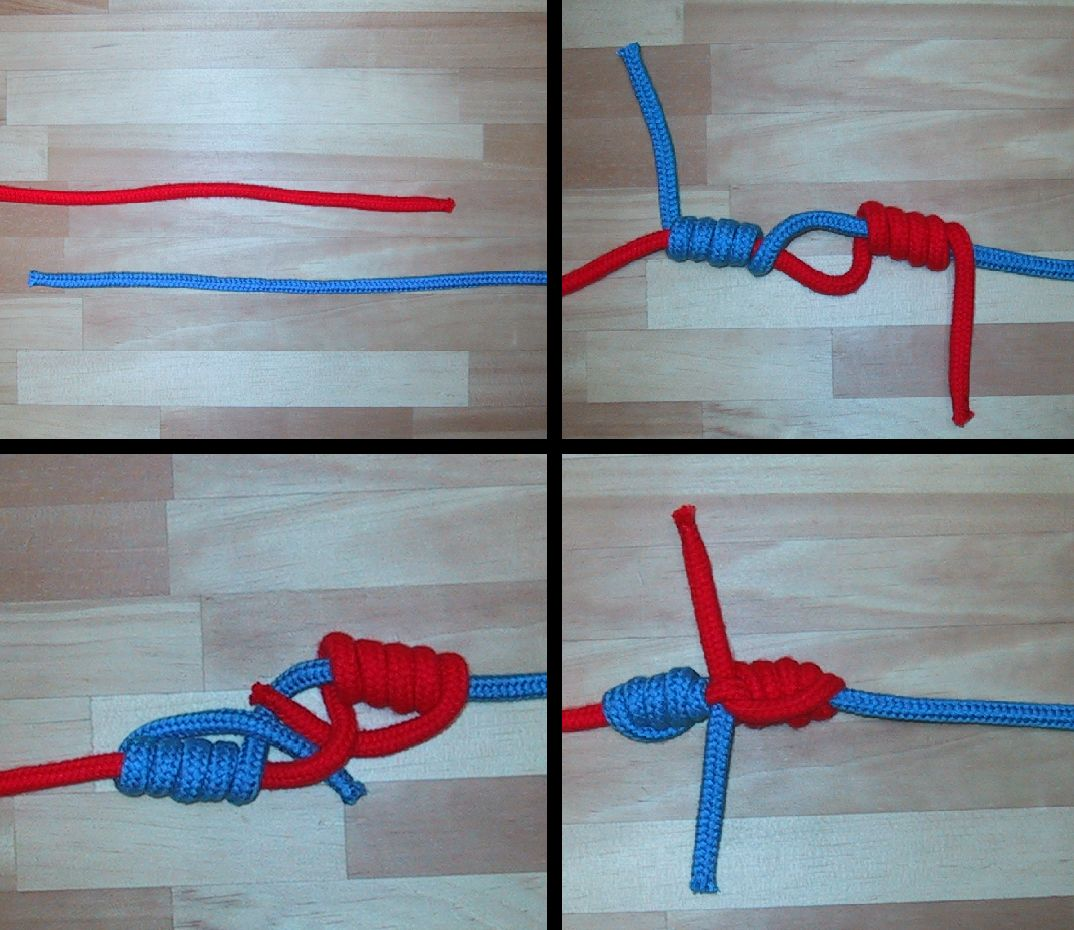
Blood knot step by step

The above method has been called by Stanley Barnes "outcoil", and is contrasted with the method that resembles the finished knot from the start, "incoil". In fishing line, and in other material if not deliberately set snug and maybe re-set after some initial tensioning, the outcoil form will transform into the incoil form.

The knot is tightened by moistening it and pulling on the long ends of the line. This causes the wraps to tighten and compress, creating two short sections of "barrel", which look much like a hangman's knot, that slide together. The short ends of the line are then trimmed close to the wraps, or one of the ends may be left intact to be used for a second fly or lure, called a "dropper".

== See also ==
- List of bend knots
- List of knots
