= Transom knot =

Simple lashing knot

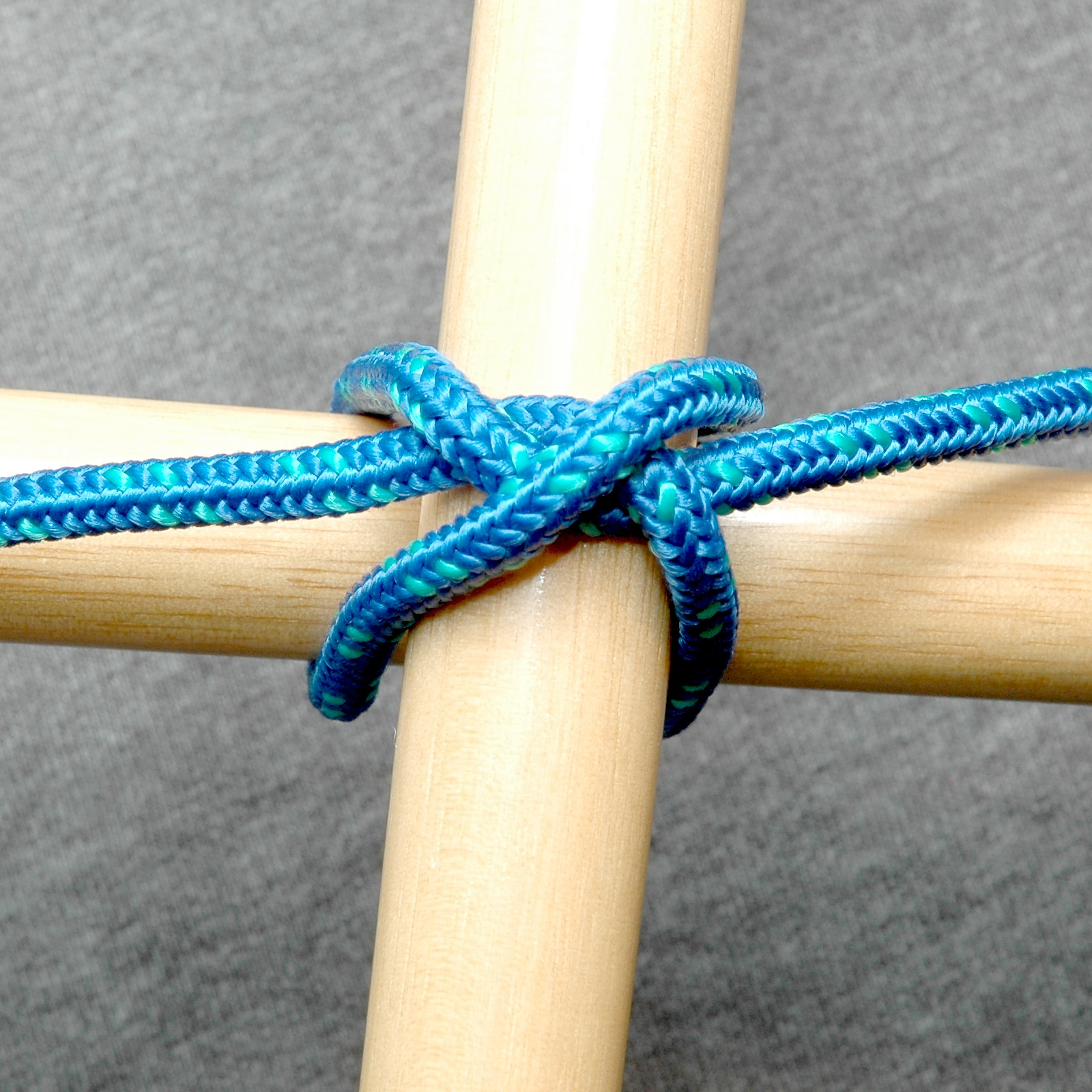
- Category: Lashing
- Related: Strangle knot, Constrictor knot, Square lashing
- Releasing: Jamming
- Typical use: Light-duty right-angle lashing
- ABoK: #385, #1182, #1255, #3372

The transom knot is a simple lashing knot used to secure two linear objects, such as spars, at right angles to each other.

== Relation to other knots ==
While often described in relation to the constrictor knot, the underlying structure of the transom knot is the strangle knot. The introduction of a second, perpendicular spar into a loose strangle knot tied around another spar will illustrate this point. In relation to the upper spar, the crossings of the knot come to very closely resemble those of a constrictor knot.

Perhaps because of this Clifford Ashley described the transom knot as both "a modification of" and "closely related to" the constrictor knot. Despite these descriptions the transom knot is consistently illustrated in The Ashley Book of Knots as being based on a strangle knot.

== Use ==
Suggested for binding kite sticks by Ashley, it is useful generally as a light-duty or temporary square lashing. To reinforce, a second transom knot can be made on the opposite side and at a right-angle to the first.
