= Double overhand knot =

Type of stopper knot

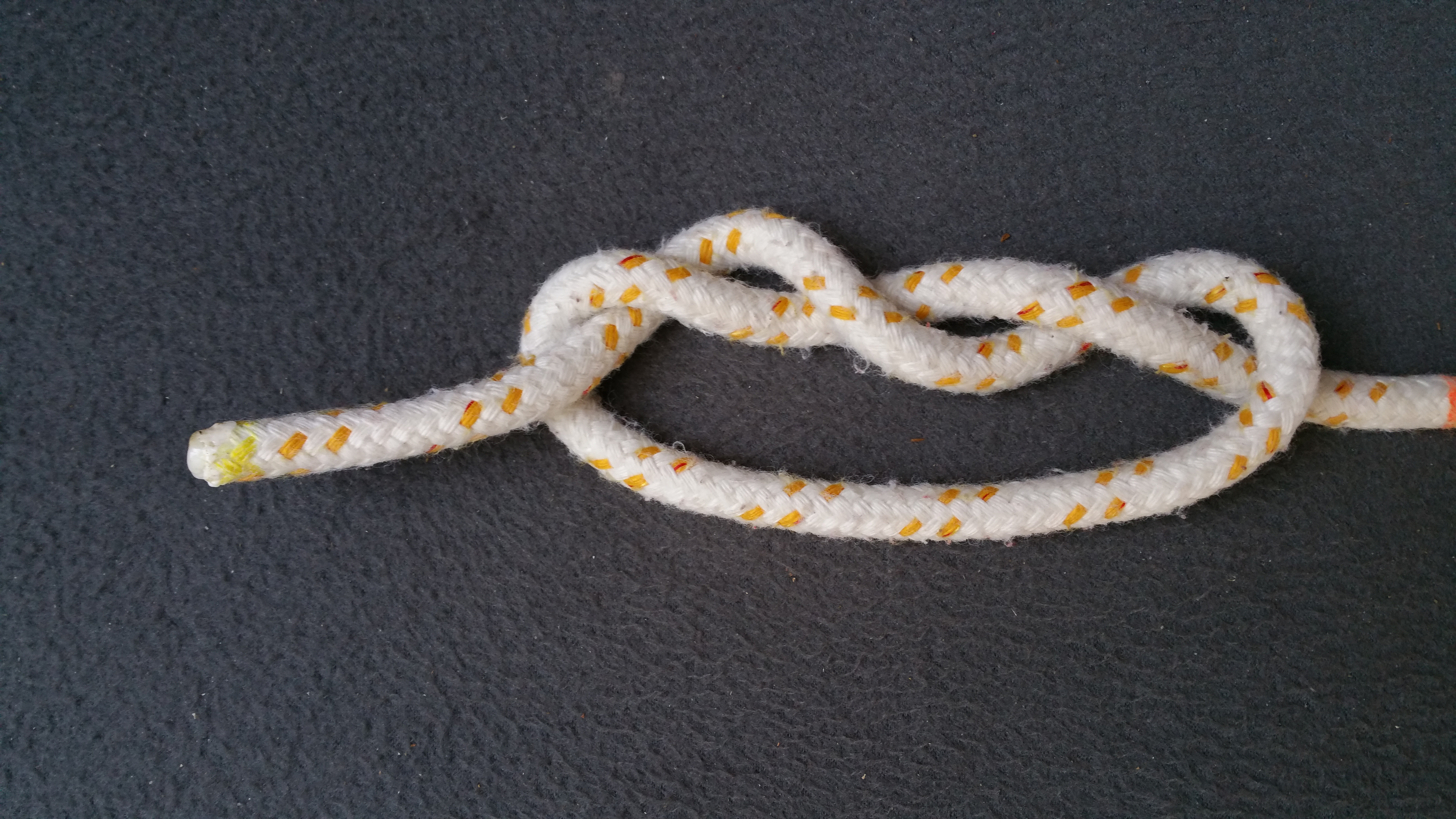
- Category: Stopper
- Efficiency: moderate
- Related: overhand knot, surgeon's knot, strangle knot, double fisherman's knot
- ABoK: #516
- A/B notation: 5_{1}

Tying the knot

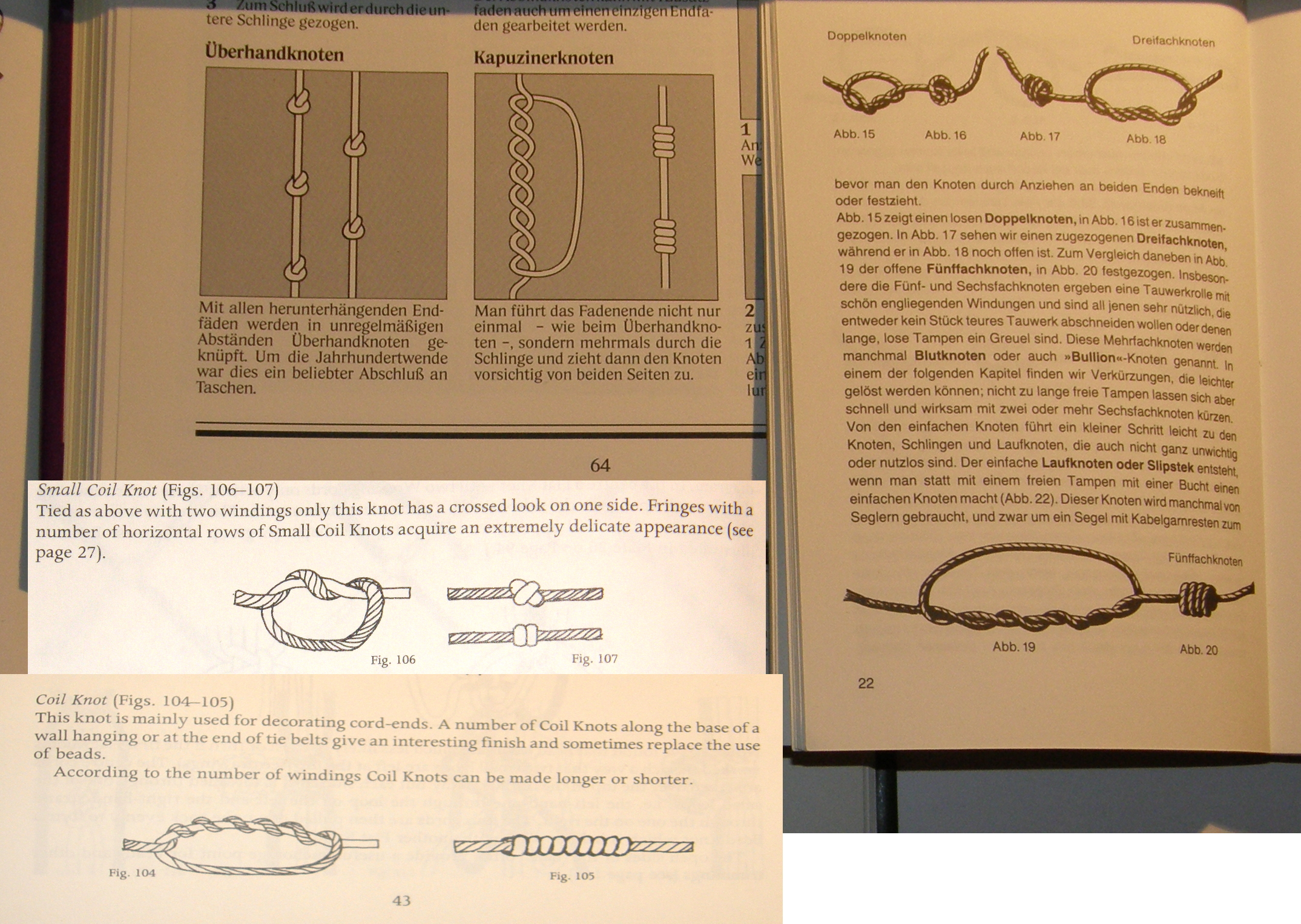
coil knot

The double overhand knot or barrel knot is simply an extension of the regular overhand knot, made with one additional pass. The result is slightly larger and more difficult to untie. It forms the first part of the surgeon's knot and both sides of a double fisherman's knot. According to The Ashley Book of Knots, "A double overhand knot tied in a cat-o'-nine-tails is termed a blood knot."

When weighted, it can be difficult to untie, especially when wet.

The strangle knot is a rearranged double overhand knot made around an object. It is sometimes used to secure items to posts.

== Instructions for tying ==
1. Tie an overhand knot at the end of a rope but do not tighten the knot down.
2. Pass the end of the line through the loop created by the first overhand knot.
3. Tighten the knot down while sliding it into place at the end of the line. Be sure to leave some tail sticking out from the end of the knot.

Alternatively, the working end of the rope can be wrapped around the standing end twice, and then passed through both resulting loops. Both methods result in the same knot, though the latter is easier to dress in the compact finished form.

With either method, more loops can be included to make a longer multiple overhand knot (which is also known as a barrel knot or blood knot).

== See also ==
- List of knots
