= Half knot =

Half knot may refer to the overhand knot, as it forms the first half of a reef knot, thief knot, granny knot, grief knot, or:

- Half-Windsor knot
- Half blood knot
- Half hitch (Two half-hitches)
