= Surgical knot =

Methods of tying medical sutures

Surgical knots (ligatures) are the knots used to bind suture materials together while binding tissue in surgery. They are used in medical and veterinary settings.

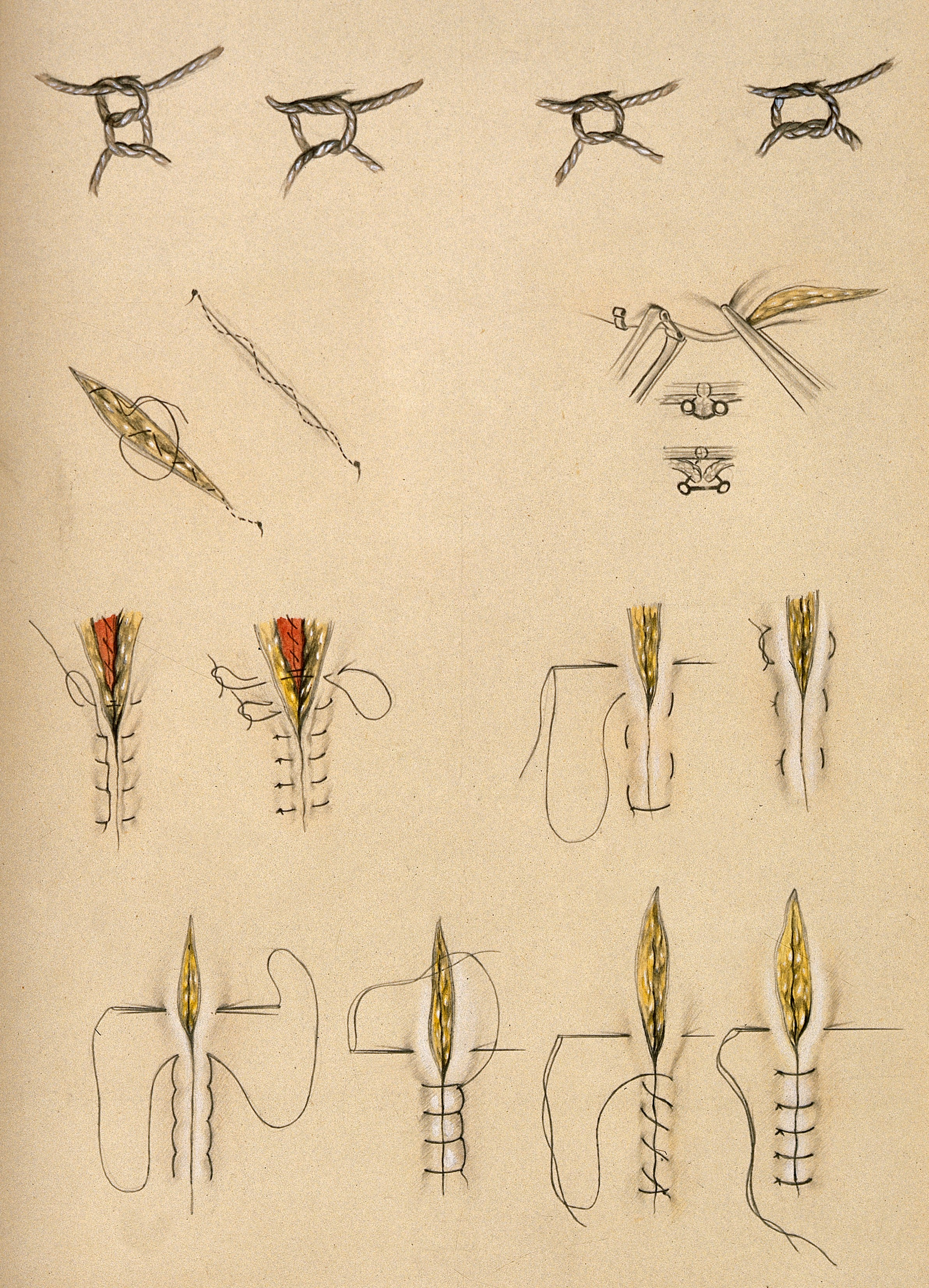
Historical diagrams illustrating various surgical stitches and knots

== History ==
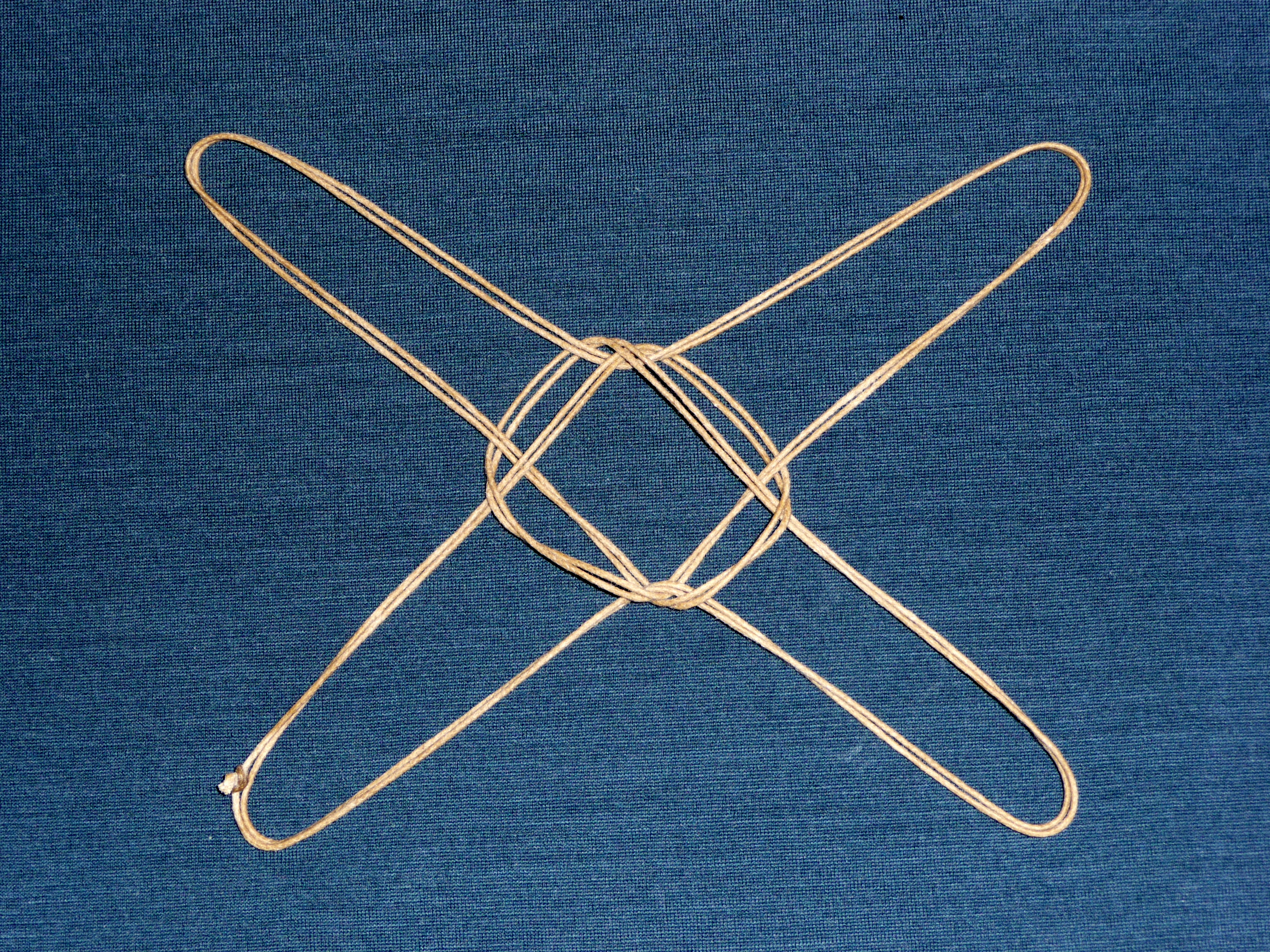
Heraklas' sling XIII, the plinthios brokhos is produced in the same manner as a string figure.

Surgical knots have been used since the first century when they were described by the Greek physician Heraklas in a monograph on surgical knots and slings. In the past, the training of astronauts has also included the tying of surgical knots.

== Application ==
The effective tying of surgical knots is a critical skill for surgeons, since if the knot does not stay intact, the consequences may be serious, especially in situations such as following a pulmonary resection, laparoscopic cholecystectomy, or hysterectomy. The primary goal of surgical knot tying is to allow the capacity of a knot (or ligature) to be tightened and remain tight. Ligatures are locked in place and finished with multiple overhand knots. Nevertheless, slipping occasionally occurs before the addition of the final knot, particularly during an instrument tie.

== Knots ==
The constrictor knot is the knot most commonly used for binding. The constrictor knot closely resembles the clove hitch, except the two ends form an overhand knot go under the overriding turn. New knots have also been described.

Other commonly employed knots include the surgeon's knot, modified surgeon's knot, single-double other side knot, strangle knot and modified miller's knot. The Surgeon's knot has been a standard ligature, however in one study, it demonstrated slippage.

While the suture is being put in place a knot is used to secure the suture. Tying the knot may be done inside the body or outside the body. Between these two options, knot tying inside the body requires more experience, as the surgeon is required to use laparoscopic instrumentation rather than their fingers to loop the suture. Tying the knot outside the body is far simpler for most surgeons, as the suture is looped with fingers similar to that of traditional tying. Each knot that is formed has to be guided through a laparoscopic cannula and made tight with a knot-pusher to create the knot.

In laparoscopic surgery, a stronger braided suture is often preferred if the knot pusher is used because suture fraying can be a possible side effect of this technique. A disadvantage of knot tying being done outside the body is that it often causes more tension and can cause tissue tearing while suturing delicate tissue.

Roeder knot

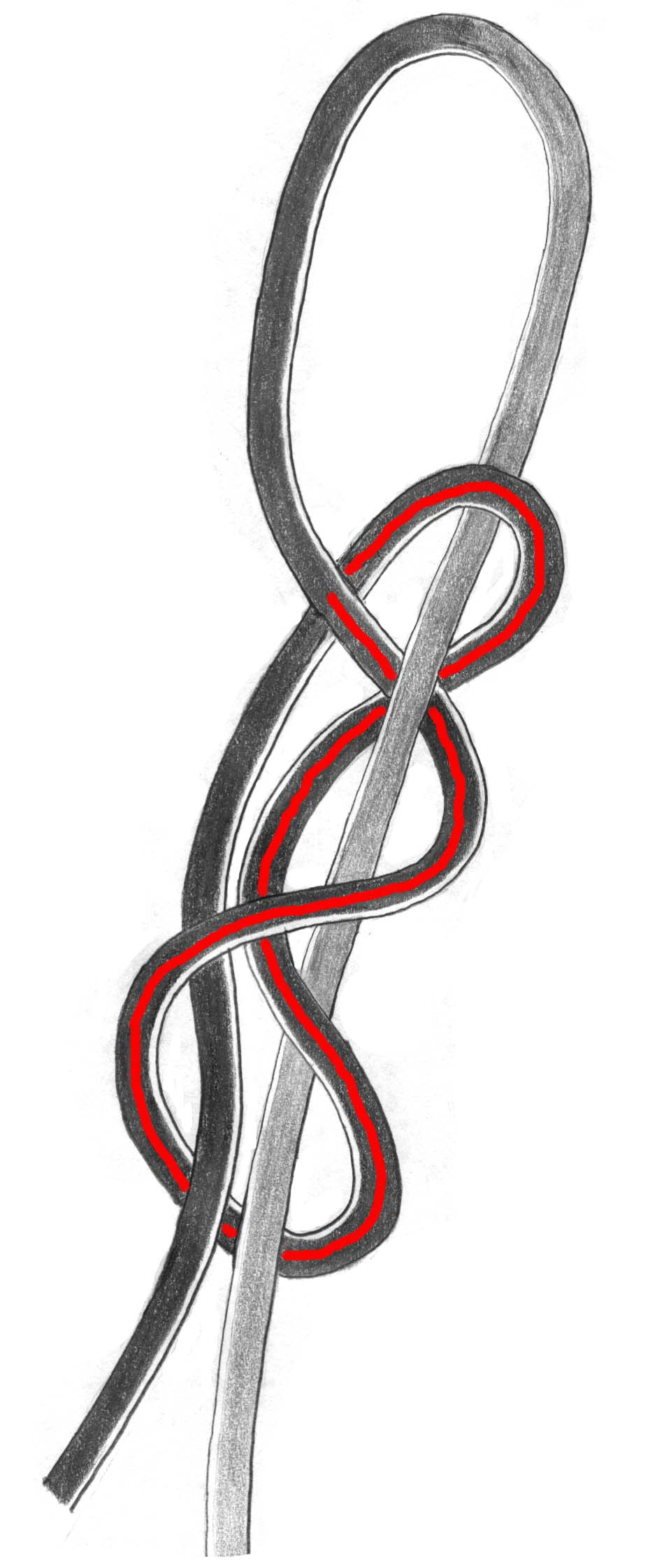
Von Leffern knot

== Alternatives and risks ==
An alternative to the surgical knot is a disposable clip that is placed at the end of the suture to keep stitches secure. A hemoclip is a titanium V-shaped clip with extensions that are squeezed together during application. The clips are available in various sizes and were originally designed to compress vessels for hemostasis.

Stronger braided suturing thread is preferred during this type of procedure, as the knot has a tendency to fray as it is slides down the cannula. At the end of the running suture line, clips can be placed across the suture tail. The barbed suture is a knotless surgical suture that has a pattern of barbs on its surface. These barbs lock the suture into the tissue, eliminating the tying of knots. Barbed sutures are typically used in cosmetic and reconstructive surgery. There are concerns that knot tying may be related to glove puncture but a current study demonstrated that instead friction from continuous suturing only left ‘marks’ on the little finger with no glove puncture.

== Training ==
Much effort goes into the training of medical students regarding the surgical skill of knot tying. One method, called the “Quiet Eye Training” has shown greater success than more traditional forms of instruction.

== See also ==
- List of bend knots
- List of binding knots
- List of knots
- List of surgeries by type
