= Grief knot =

Combined features of granny and thief

- Names: Grief knot, What knot, Whatnot, Grass bend, Reeving-line bend
- Category: Trick
- Category 2: Bend
- Related: Reef knot, Thief knot, Granny knot
- Releasing: Non-jamming
- Typical use: Used for jokes and tricks. It unrolls itself under a light load.
- Caveat: Highly insecure
- ABoK: #1208, #1406, #1407, #1459, #1490, #2579, #259

A grief knot (also what knot) is a knot which combines the features of a granny knot and a thief knot, producing a result which is not generally useful for working purposes. The word grief does not carry its usual meaning but is a portmanteau of granny and thief.

The grief knot resembles the granny knot, but tied so that the working ends come out diagonally from each other, whereas a granny knot's ends both come out on the same side. It unravels rather elegantly: as tension is applied, the ropes rotate like little cogs, each one twisting to feed the rope through the knot.

The whatnot. This is the same knot formation as the granny knot, but the ends are diagonally opposite each other. It is hardly a practical knot. But with the ends seized it is called the reeving line bend, and it also serves as an interesting trick.

— The Ashley Book of Knots

== Tying ==
To tie the grief knot, tie a single "overhand knot" (nb: this isn't the same as a single-strand "overhand knot" often used as a stopper or as a component of other knots, such as the fisherman's knot or ring water knot), as if starting a reef knot. Then thrust the two free ends together down through the center of the just-tied overhand knot. Twist the free ends to form half hitches to lock, twist the other way for the granny knot-like configuration that rolls apart when the standing parts are pulled. In short, if the standing parts (the "main lines" which bear force into the knot) nip/cross their own ends, the knot will lock; otherwise, it will probably slip.

== As a trick knot ==
The starkly differing behavior of the knot, depending on how it is arranged, has been exploited as the basis of a parlor trick. When pulling on the standing ends the knot starts slipping and the working ends become crossed. By twisting the working ends so that they uncross and then recross in reverse, the knot's structure is changed so that it will no longer slip. The twisting motion has been paralleled to the turning of a key, "locking" and "unlocking" the knot.

== Security ==
Because the grief knot is known to slip apart "with astonishing ease", it is considered one of the most insecure of knots.

However, in its locked opposing half-hitch arrangement, the grief knot has been used as a practical bend for tying together flat materials, such as straps, belts, blades of grass, and similar materials. This is because the flat shape helps to prevent the knot from accidentally "unlocking". When used in this manner, the knot is known as a grass bend.

== Related knots ==
Reef (square) knot

Thief knot

Granny knot

Grief knot

Surgeon's knot

== See also ==
- List of binding knots
- List of knots
