= Boa constrictor (disambiguation) =

Boa constrictor is a large South American constricting snake.

Boa constrictor may also refer to:

- "Boa Constrictor" (song), a 1962 song by Shel Silverstein later covered by Johnny Cash
- "Boa Constrictor", a song by The Magnetic Fields from their 1999 album 69 Love Songs
- Earl "Snakehips" Tucker (1905–1937), the "Human Boa Constrictor," creator of the Snakehips dance in the early 1930s
- "Boa Constrictor", a novel by Ivan Yakovych Franko
- Boa knot, a binding knot invented by Peter Collingwood in 1996
