= Bourchier knot =

Type of knot

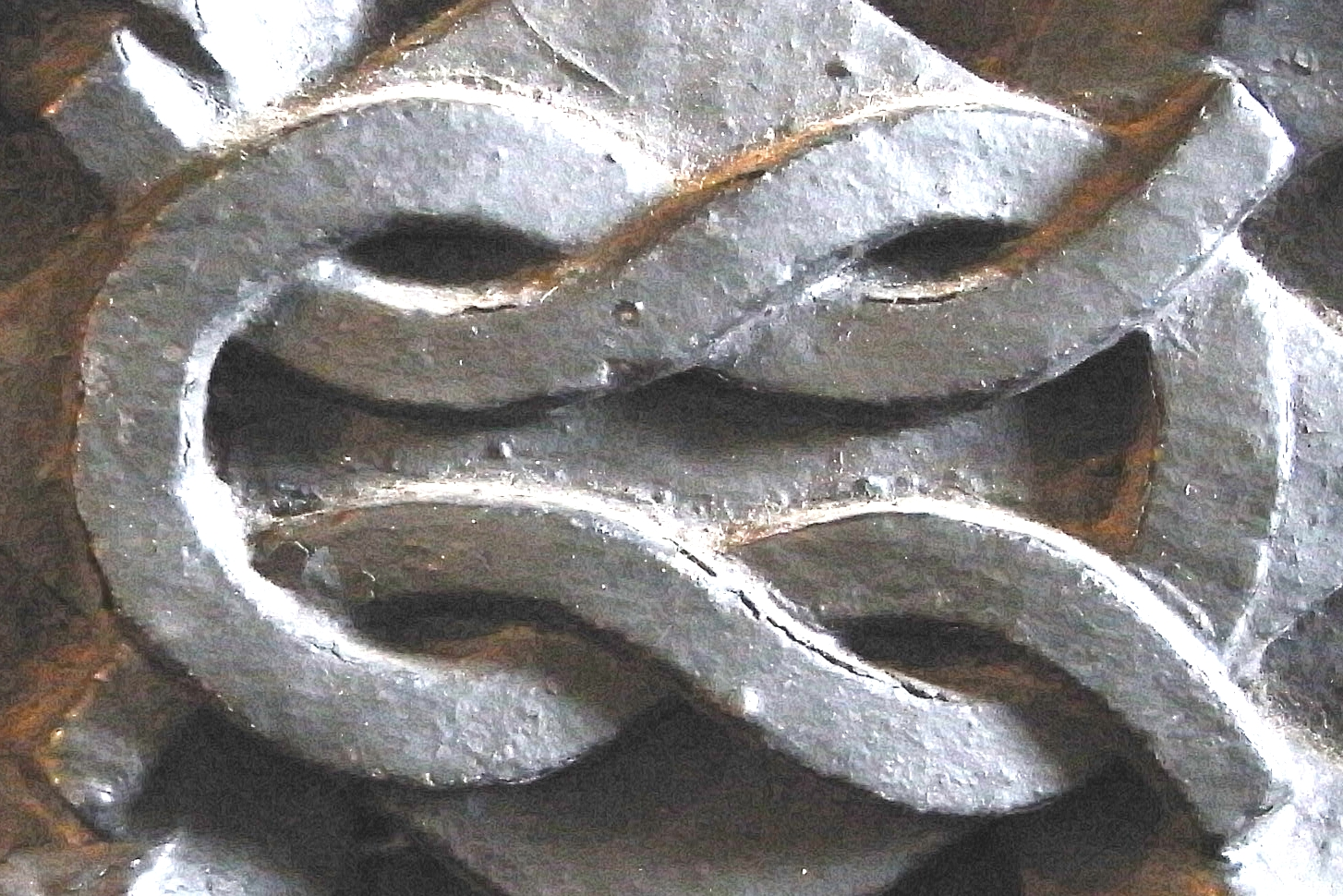
Relief sculpture of a Bourchier knot (of the reef knot variety) on the chest-tomb in Bampton Church, Devon, supposed to be that of Thomasine Hankford (d.1453), heiress of the feudal barony of Bampton, wife of William Bourchier, 9th Baron FitzWarin (1407-1470)

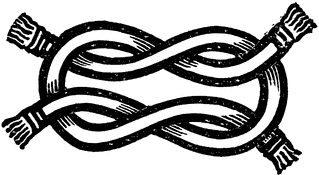
Bourchier knot (of granny knot variety), published in Aveling, S.T., Heraldry Ancient & Modern, New York, 1891

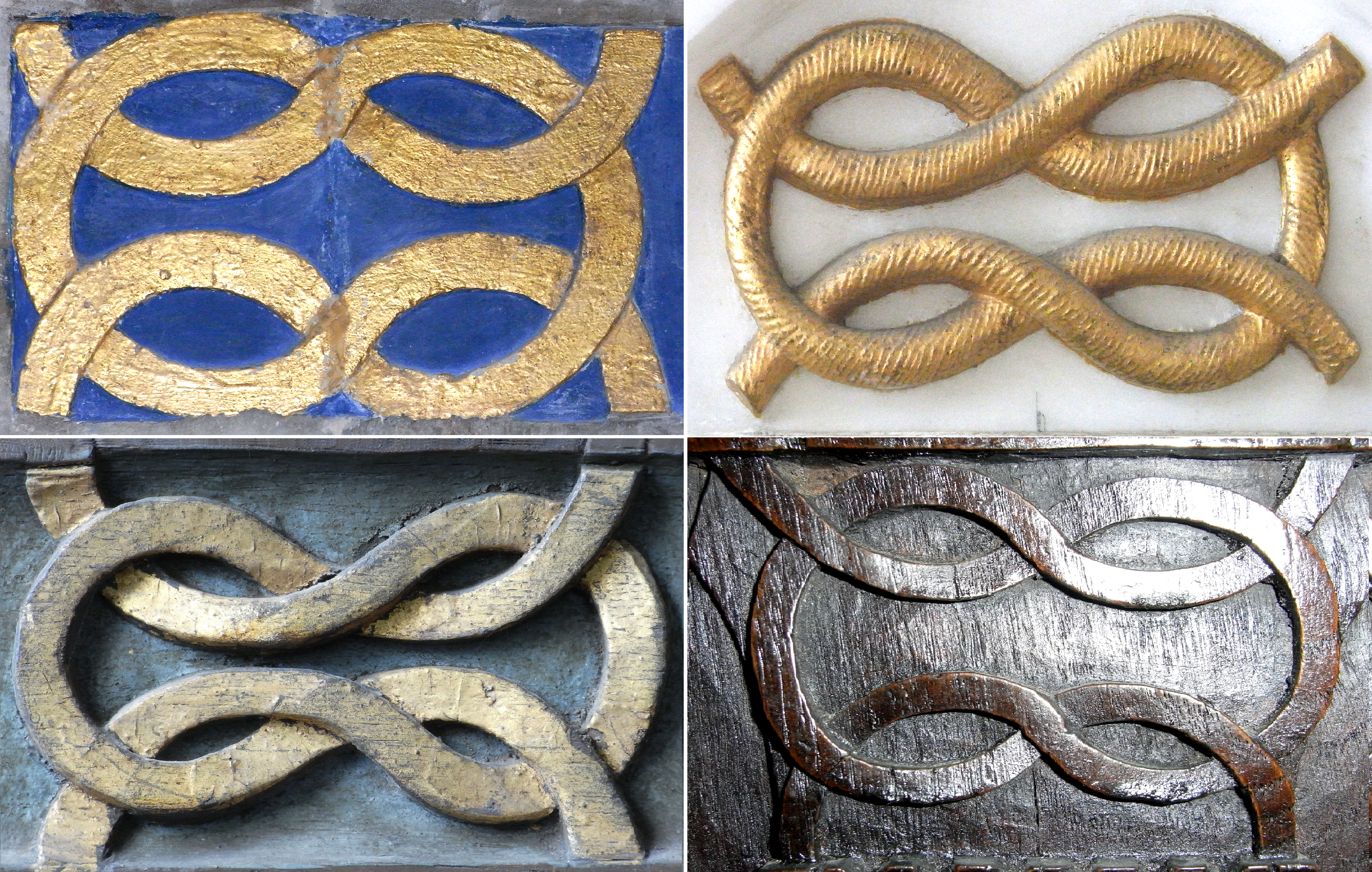
Examples of Bourchier knots visible in Tawstock Church, Devon, parish church of Tawstock Court, seat of the Bourchier Earls of Bath. Top left: detail from monument to William Bourchier, 3rd Earl of Bath (1557-1623); top right: detail from monument to Sir Henry Bourchier Toke Wrey, 10th Baronet (1829–1900); bottom left: detail from 16th century Bourchier Pew; bottom right: detail from 16th century bench-end

The Bourchier knot is a variety of heraldic knot. It was used as a heraldic badge by the Bourchier family, whose earliest prominent ancestor in England was John de Bourchier (alias Boucher, Boussier, etc., d. c. 1330), a Judge of the Common Pleas, seated at Stanstead Hall in the parish of Halstead, Essex. He was the father of Robert Bourchier, 1st Baron Bourchier (d.1349), Lord Chancellor of England. The various branches of his descendants held the titles Baron Bourchier, Count of Eu, Viscount Bourchier, Earl of Essex, Baron Berners, Baron FitzWarin and Earl of Bath. The knot should perhaps have been called the "FitzWarin knot" as according to Boutell (1864) the device was first used by the FitzWarin family, whose heir was the Bourchier family.

== Forms ==
The Bourchier knot is shown in two forms: as a reef knot and as a granny knot.

=== Examples of reef knot form ===
- Relief sculpture of a Bourchier knot (of the reef knot variety) on the chest-tomb in Bampton Church, Devon, supposed to be that of Thomasine Hankford (d.1453), heiress of the feudal barony of Bampton, wife of William Bourchier, 9th Baron FitzWarin (1407-1470), great-grandson of the 1st Baron Bourchier.

=== Examples of granny knot form ===
- Bourchier knots on the monument of William Bourchier, 3rd Earl of Bath (1557-1623) in St Peter's Church, Tawstock, Devon.

== Prominent examples ==
- Beningbrough Hall, North Yorkshire, owned at one time by a branch of the Bourchier family. A large Bourchier knot is cut into a lawn adjoining the house.
- On the tomb of Thomas Bourchier (c.1404-1486), Archbishop of Canterbury in Canterbury Cathedral
- Sculpted on the Tudor gatehouse of Tawstock Court in North Devon, seat of the Bourchier Earls of Bath.
- Tawstock Church in North Devon, visible on monuments to Bourchiers and Wrey baronets.

== Sources ==
- Aveling, S.T. Heraldry: Ancient and Modern, New York, 1891. (Illustration of granny-knot form)
- Mollett, J.W., Illustrated Dictionary of Art and Archeology by J W Mollett, 1883. (Fig.410, Illustration of reef-knot form)
- Arthur Charles Fox-Davies, Complete Guide to Heraldry, 1909, pp. 390, 469.
