= Granny knot =

Type of knot

- Names: Granny knot, false knot, lubber's knot, calf knot, booby knot
- Category: Binding
- Origin: Ancient
- Related: Reef knot, thief knot, grief knot
- Releasing: Often jams
- Caveat: Should not be used as a bend. Inferior to reef knot for binding purposes, it can release suddenly and unpredictably.
- ABoK: #3, #80, #186, #464, #1206, #1405, #2553

The granny knot is a binding knot, used to secure a rope or line around an object. It is considered inferior to the reef knot (square knot), which it superficially resembles. Neither of these knots should be used as a bend knot for attaching two ropes together.

The granny knot is also called the false, lubber's, calf, and booby knot. Patterson's Nautical Encyclopedia calls it "old granny knot" and Sir Edwin Arnold calls it the "common or garden knot." The name granny is given in Vocabulary of Sea Phrases (Anonymous, 1799) and Roding pictures the knot in 1795.

The granny consists of two identical half knots, one tied on top of the other. It has but one practical purpose that I know of and that is to serve as a surgeon's knot. Formerly it was employed for tying up parcels in five-and-ten-cent stores, but the practice was given up and paper bags substituted as they were found to be simpler.

— The Ashley Book of Knots

== Etymology ==
Called the "granny's knot" with references going back to at least 1849, the knot was so-called because it is "the natural knot tied by women or landsmen".

== Tying ==
When attempting to tie a reef knot (square knot), it is easy to produce a granny knot accidentally. This is dangerous because the granny knot can slip when heavily loaded. A tightened granny knot can also jam and is often more difficult to untie than the reef knot. It is better to tie a reef knot in nearly all circumstances. One way to distinguish them is that in the reef knot each loop passes completely over, or completely under (not through) the neck of the other.

The reef knot is commonly taught as left over right, tuck under then right over left, tuck under. The granny knot is the first step repeated twice, left over right, tuck under. This is a very common mistake made by people learning to tie a reef knot.

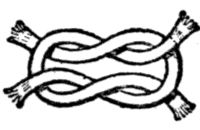
Bourchier knot of heraldry

== Heraldry ==
In heraldry, the granny knot is known as the Bourchier knot, due to being a heraldic badge of the Bourchier family.

== Related knots ==
Reef (square) knot

Thief knot

Granny knot

Grief knot

Surgeon's knot

== See also ==
- List of binding knots
- List of knots
