= Thief knot =

Type of knot

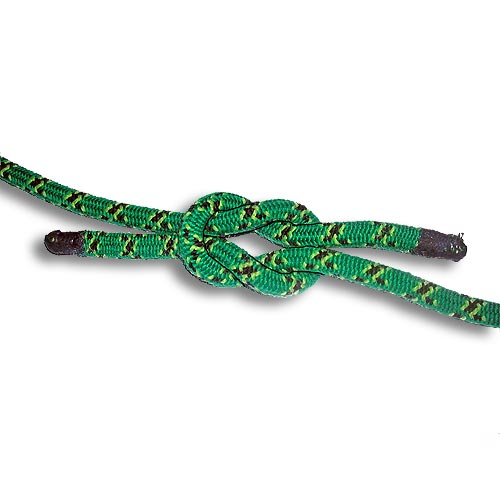
- Names: Thief knot, Bag knot, Bread bag knot
- Category: Binding
- Origin: Ancient
- Related: Reef knot, Granny knot, Grief knot
- Releasing: Jamming, but not always
- Caveat: spills
- ABoK: #1207

The thief knot resembles the reef knot (square knot) except that the free, or bitter ends are on opposite sides. It is said that sailors would secure their belongings in a ditty bag using the thief knot, often with the ends hidden. If another sailor went through the bag, the odds were high the thief would tie the bag back using the more common reef knot, revealing the tampering, hence the name. It is difficult to tie by mistake, unlike the granny knot, unless one attempts to tie a square knot in a similar manner to a sheet bend (which is the correct way to tie a thief knot), then it is possible to tie accidentally.

The thief knot is much less secure than the already insecure reef knot. It unties itself if the lines are pulled when the same action would seize a reef knot.

The thief or bag knot is also called bread bag knot. It appears very like the reef knot, but there is one real and scarcely evident difference. It does not consist of two half knots. There is a legend that sailors tie clothesbags, and bread bags with this knot and that thieves always retie them with reef knots and so are inevitably detected. It is a pleasing story that should encourage honesty. However, if I have ever met this knot in practical use, I have neither recognized it nor paid penalty for my failure to do so.

— The Ashley Book of Knots

== Tying ==
Tying the thief knot step-by-step

== Related knots ==
Reef (square) knot

Thief knot

Granny knot

Grief knot

Surgeon's knot

== See also ==
- List of binding knots
- List of knots
