= List of binding knots =

A binding knot is a knot that may be used to keep an object or multiple loose objects together, using a string or a rope that passes at least once around them. There are various binding knots, divided into two types. Friction knots are held in place by the friction between the windings of line. Knotted-ends knots are held in place by the two ends of the line being knotted together.

Stopping may be either a temporary whipping or seizing, the commonest variety consisting of a few round turns finished off with a reef knot. The purpose of a whipping is to prevent the end of a rope from fraying. A seizing holds several objects together.

— The Ashley Book of Knots

Whipping and seizing are binding knots, but are more complex since they contain many turns, like a lashing.

== List ==
- Boa knot
- Bottle sling
- Constrictor knot
- Corned beef knot
- Granny knot
- Grief knot
- Ground-line hitch
- Miller's knot
- Packer's knot
- Reef knot
- Strangle knot
- Surgeon's knot
- Thief knot
- Jamming knot
- Sheet bend
- Sheepshank
- Common whipping

== See also ==
- List of bend knots
- List of knots
- Rope splicing
