= Boa knot =

Binding knot

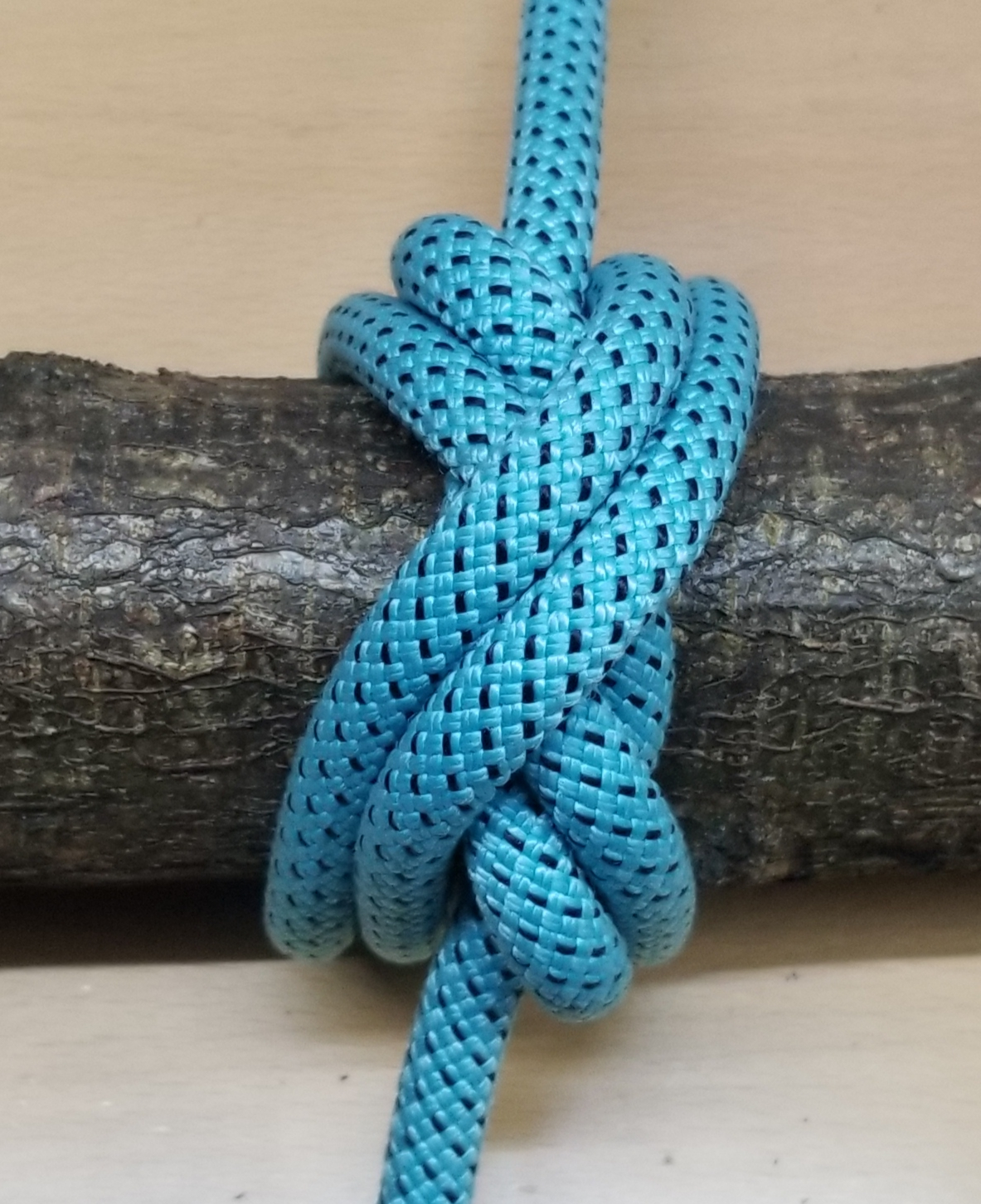
- Category: Binding
- Origin: Peter Collingwood in 1996
- Related: strangle knot, double constrictor knot
- Typical use: Best used for securing objects in cylindrical loads

The boa knot is a modern binding knot invented by weaver Peter Collingwood in 1996. His intention was to develop a knot that would hold well when the constricted object was cut close to the winds of the knot.

The boa knot is related to the strangle knot and the double constrictor knot. It combines both the structure and qualities of these other two knots. The boa knot can be very difficult to untie and is inappropriate when frequent or fast untying is needed. The knotted part needs to lie over a convex surface to hold.

The boa knot is best used for securing objects in cylindrical loads. Said knot is hard to move around.

== Tying ==
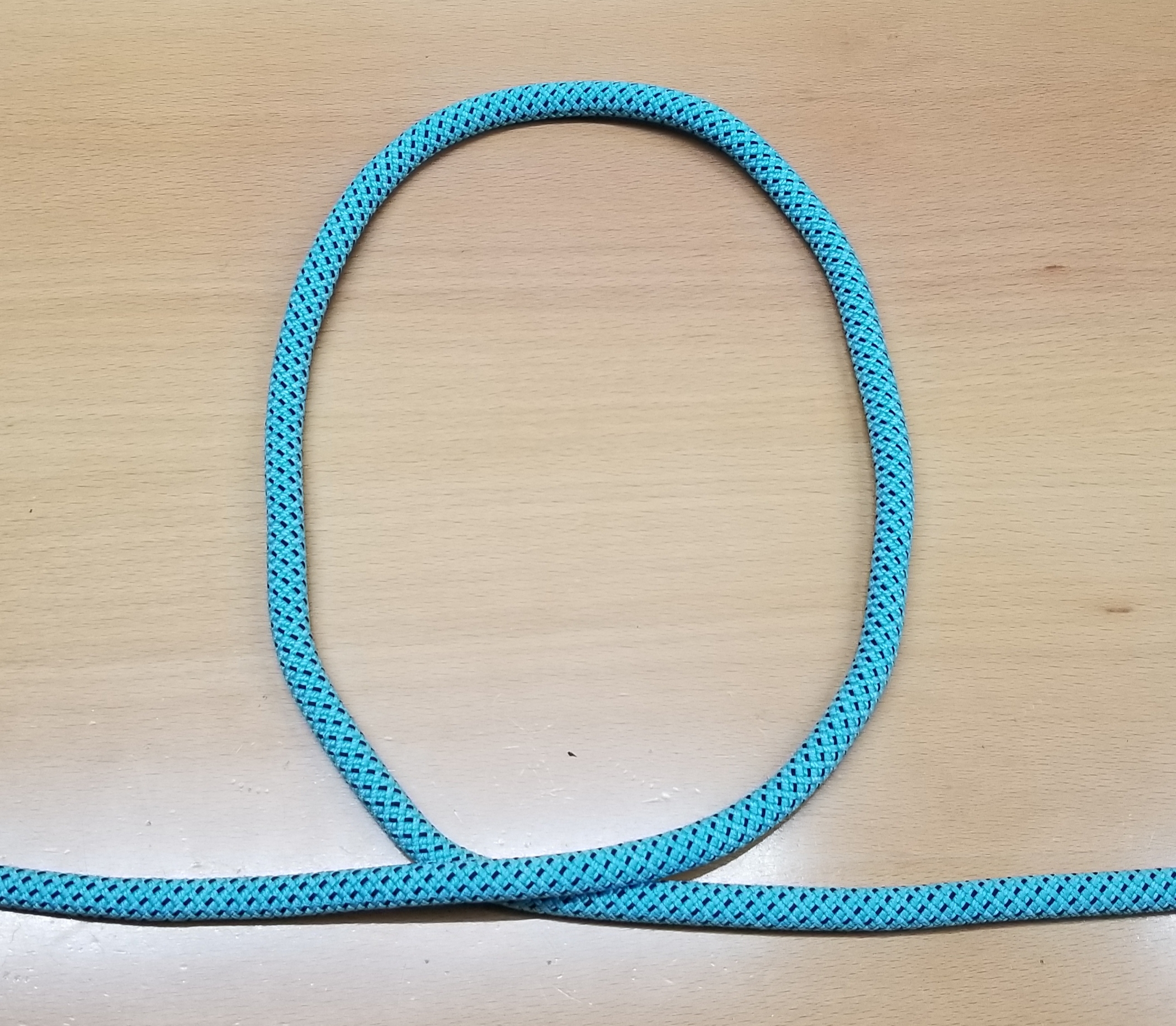
Start with making a loop counter-clockwise

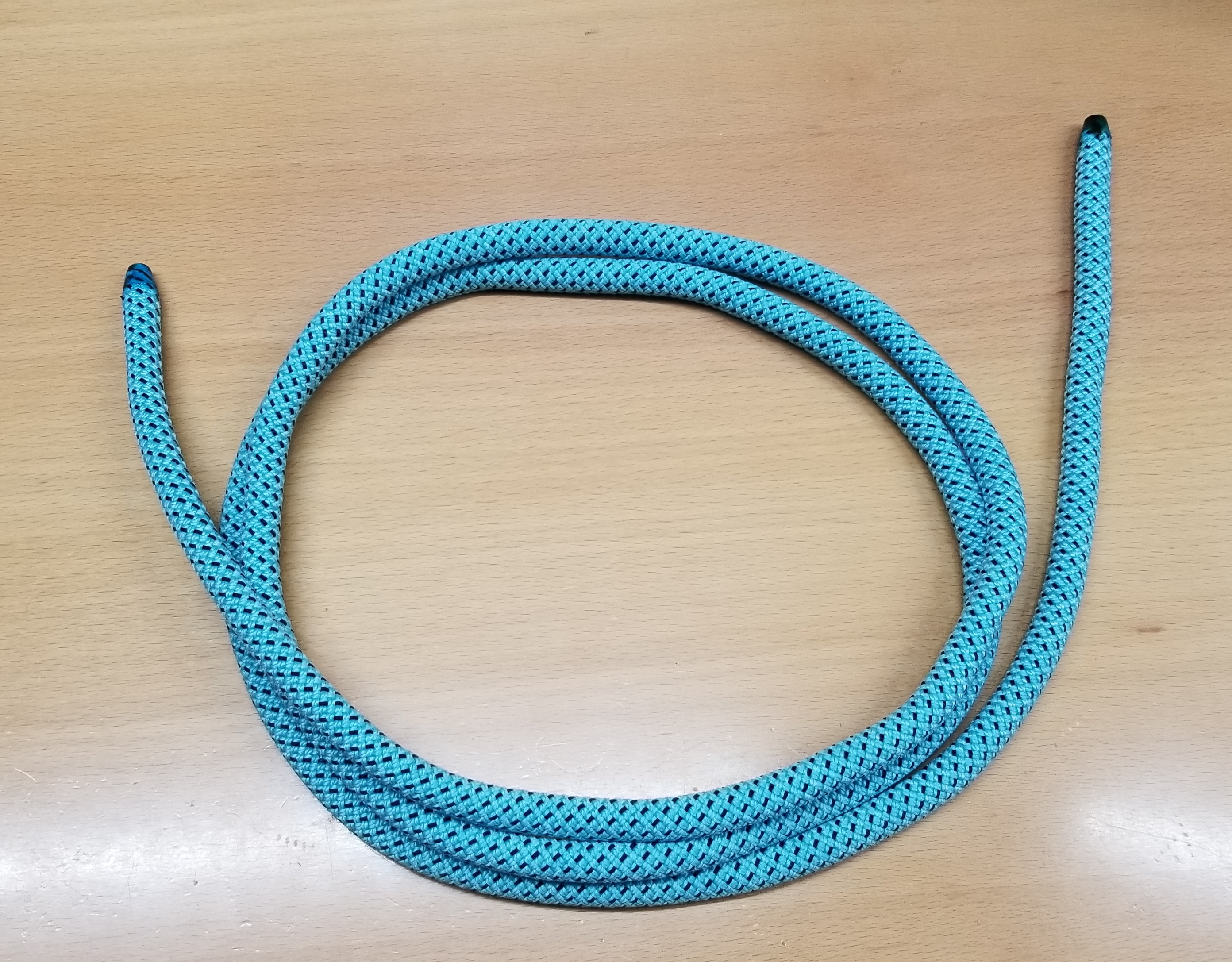
Place another loop in the same direction over the first loop

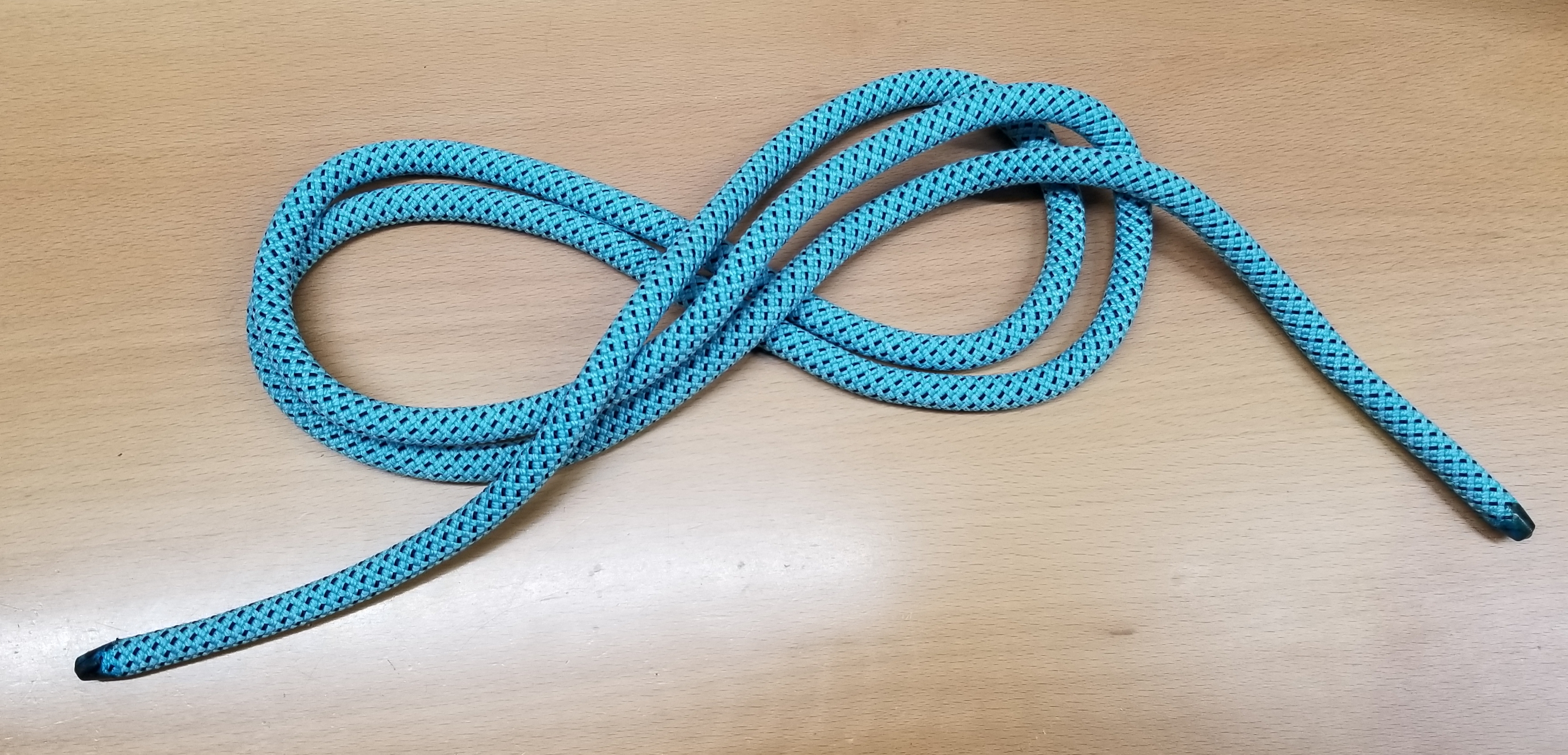
Twist these loops, by turning the right side in clockwise direction, so you get a figure-eight

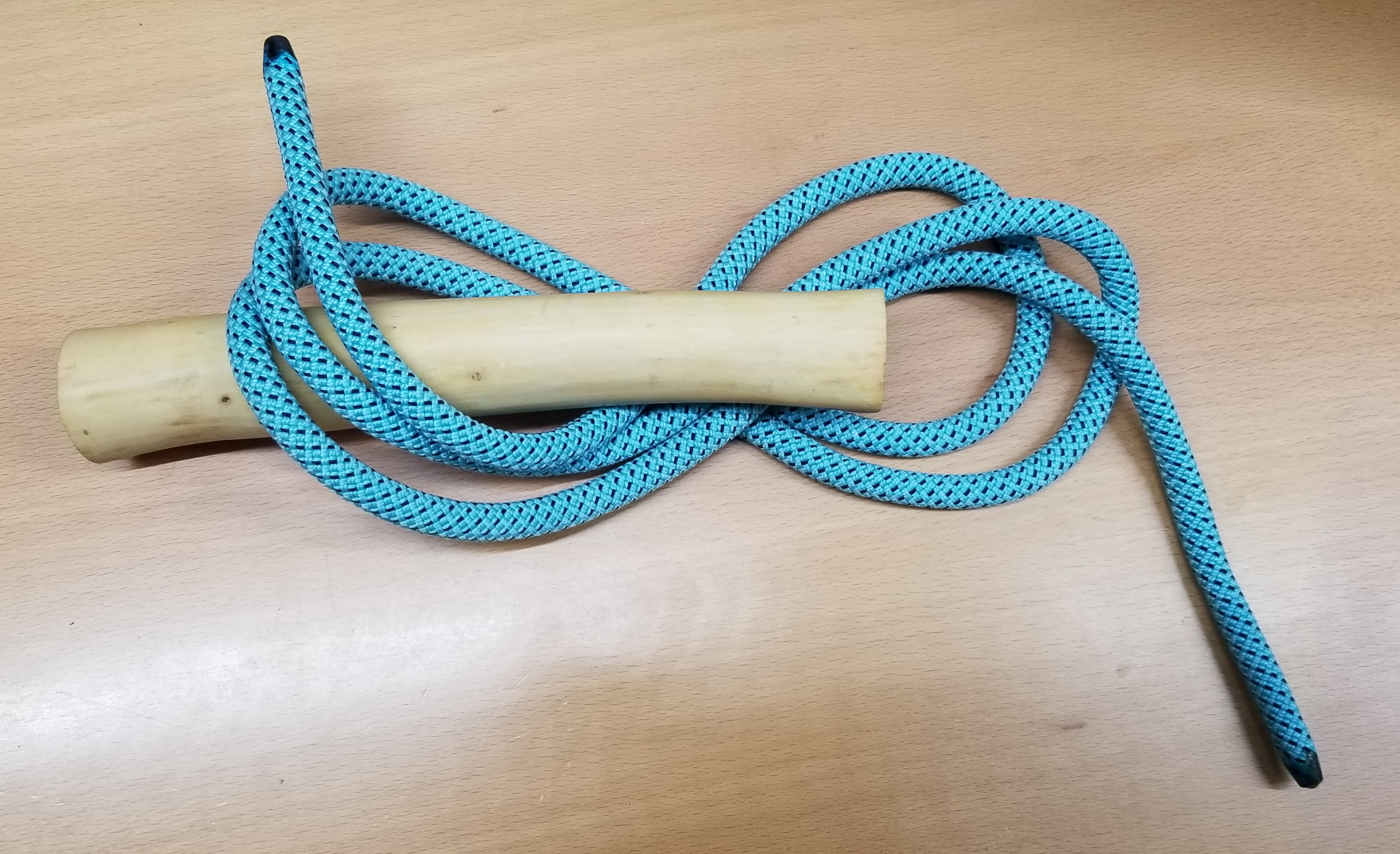
Take a cylindrical object and place it from under above in the first loops

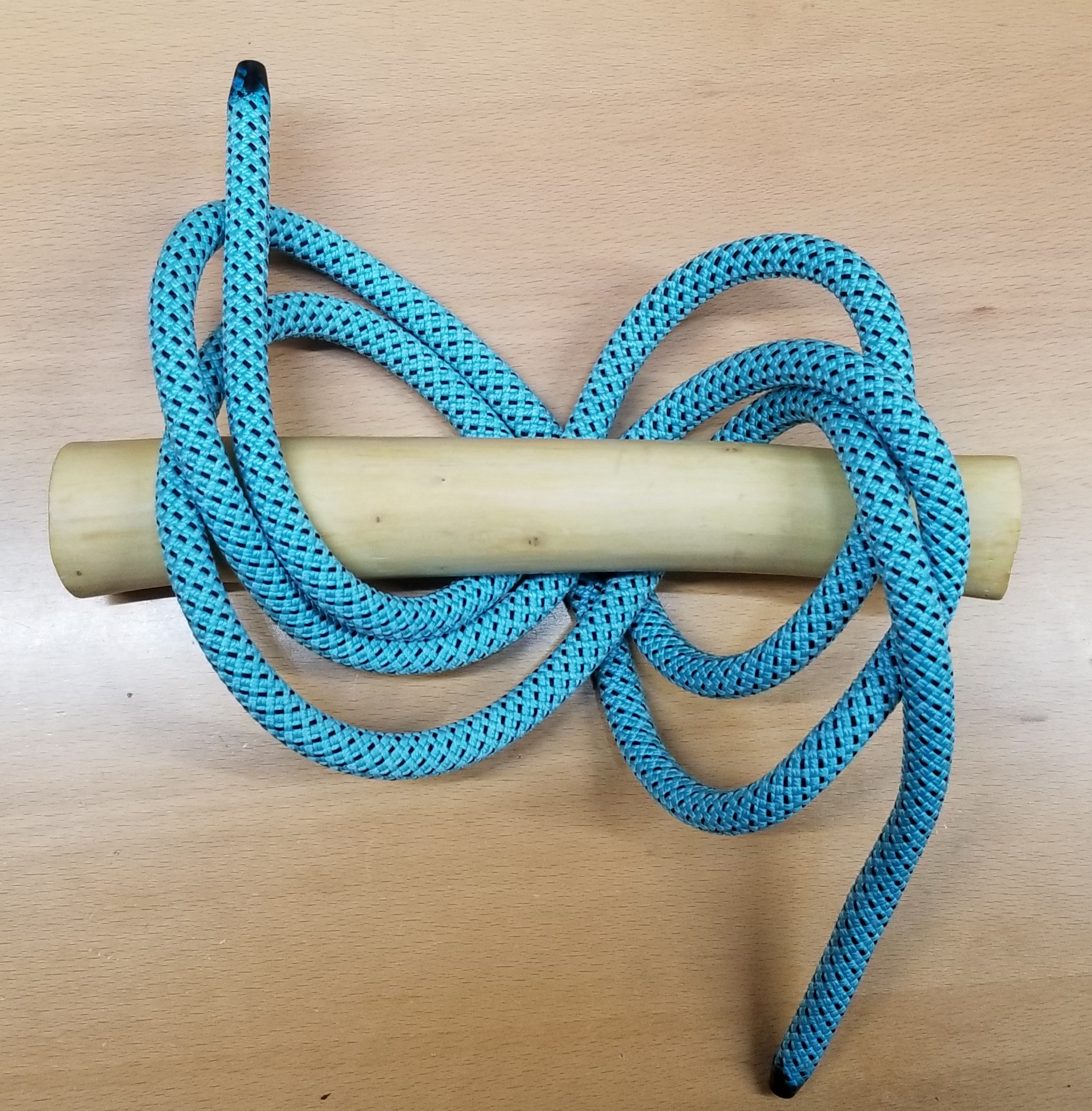
Then put the object through the other loops

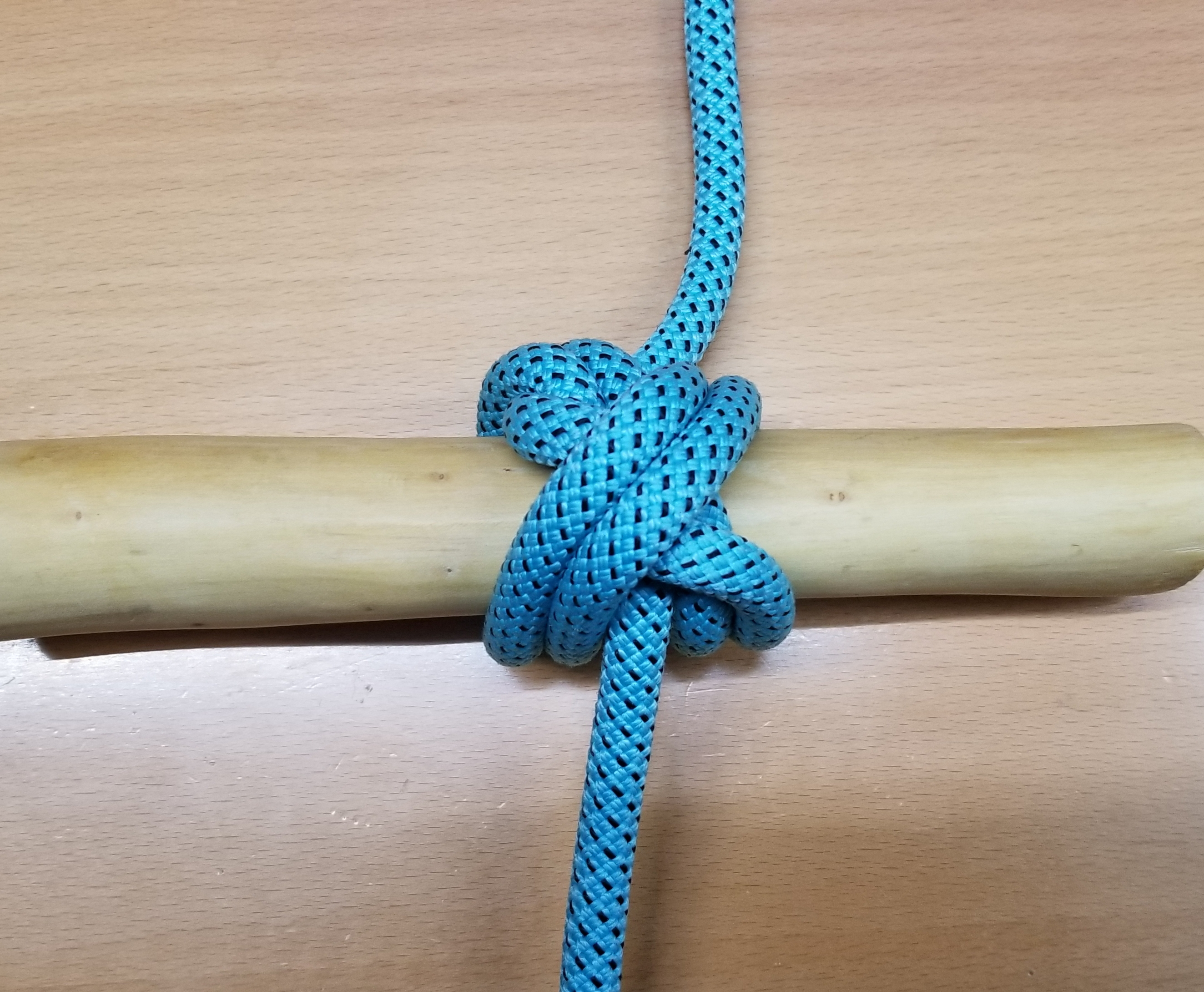
Pull the loose ends away from it, carefully shaping the knot. Make sure that the strands lined up as at the start. So they shouldn't slip out.

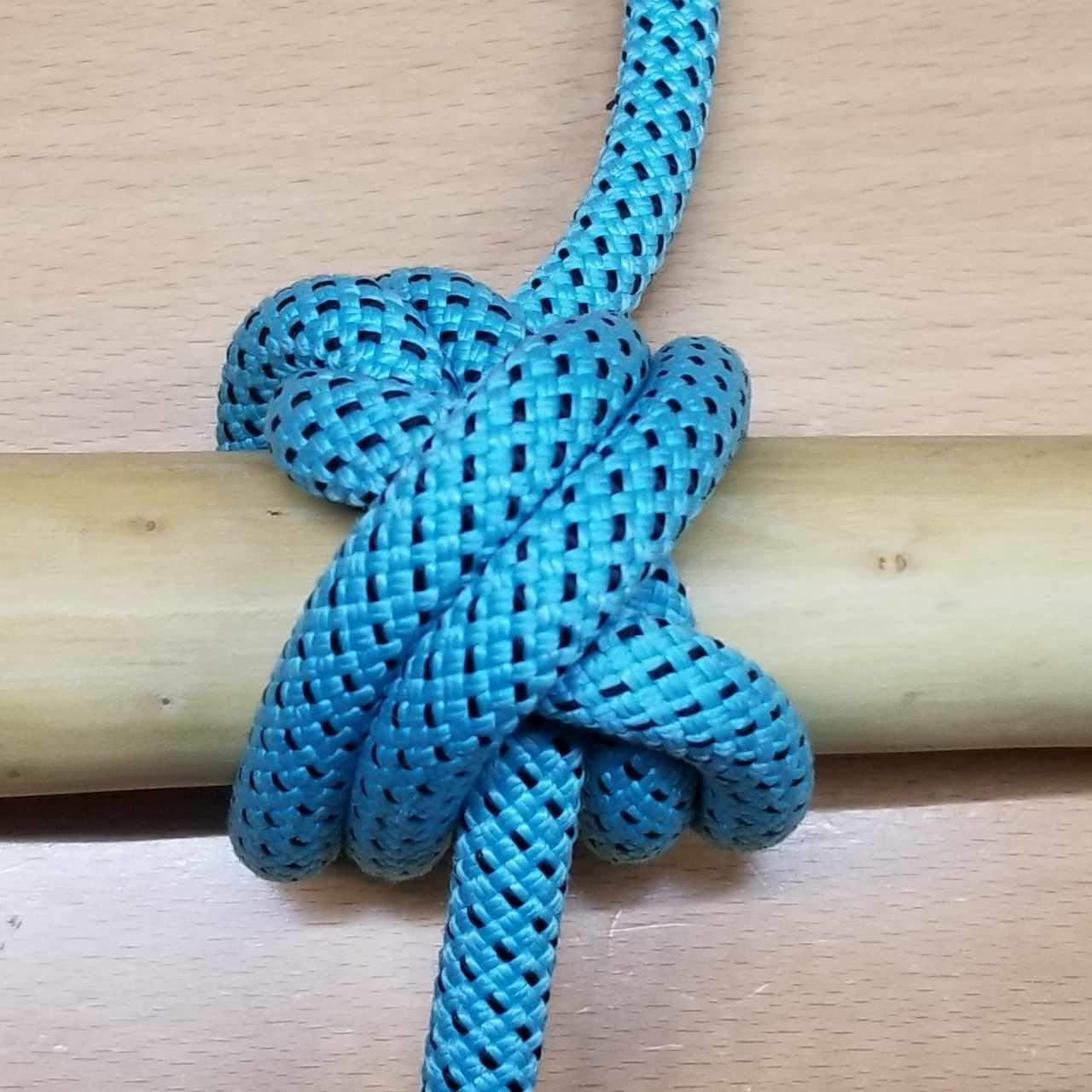
This should tighten the loops to the point where they cling firmly to the desired object, yielding the boa knot. (Frontside)

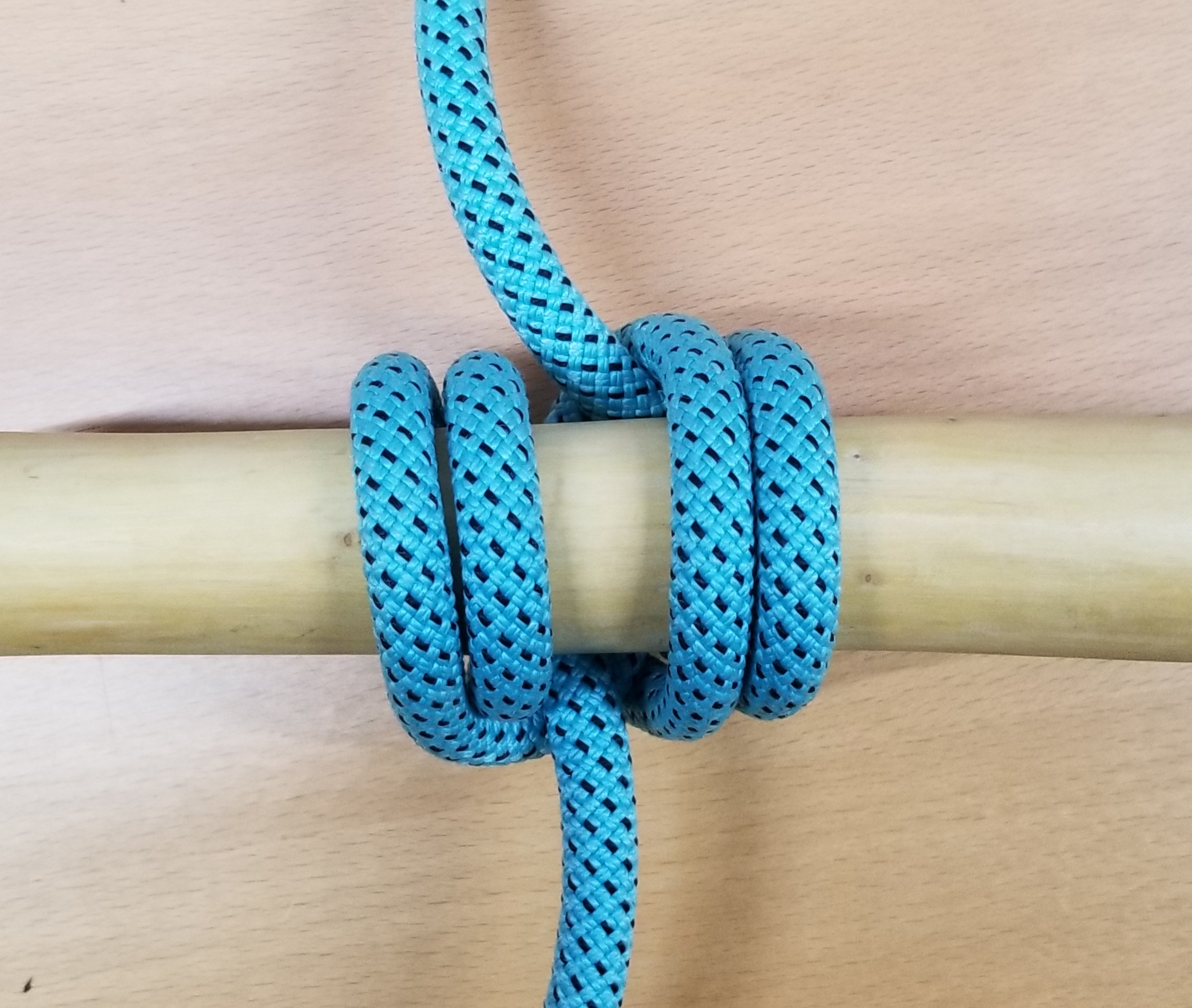
Boa-knot. (Backside)

== Alternative ==
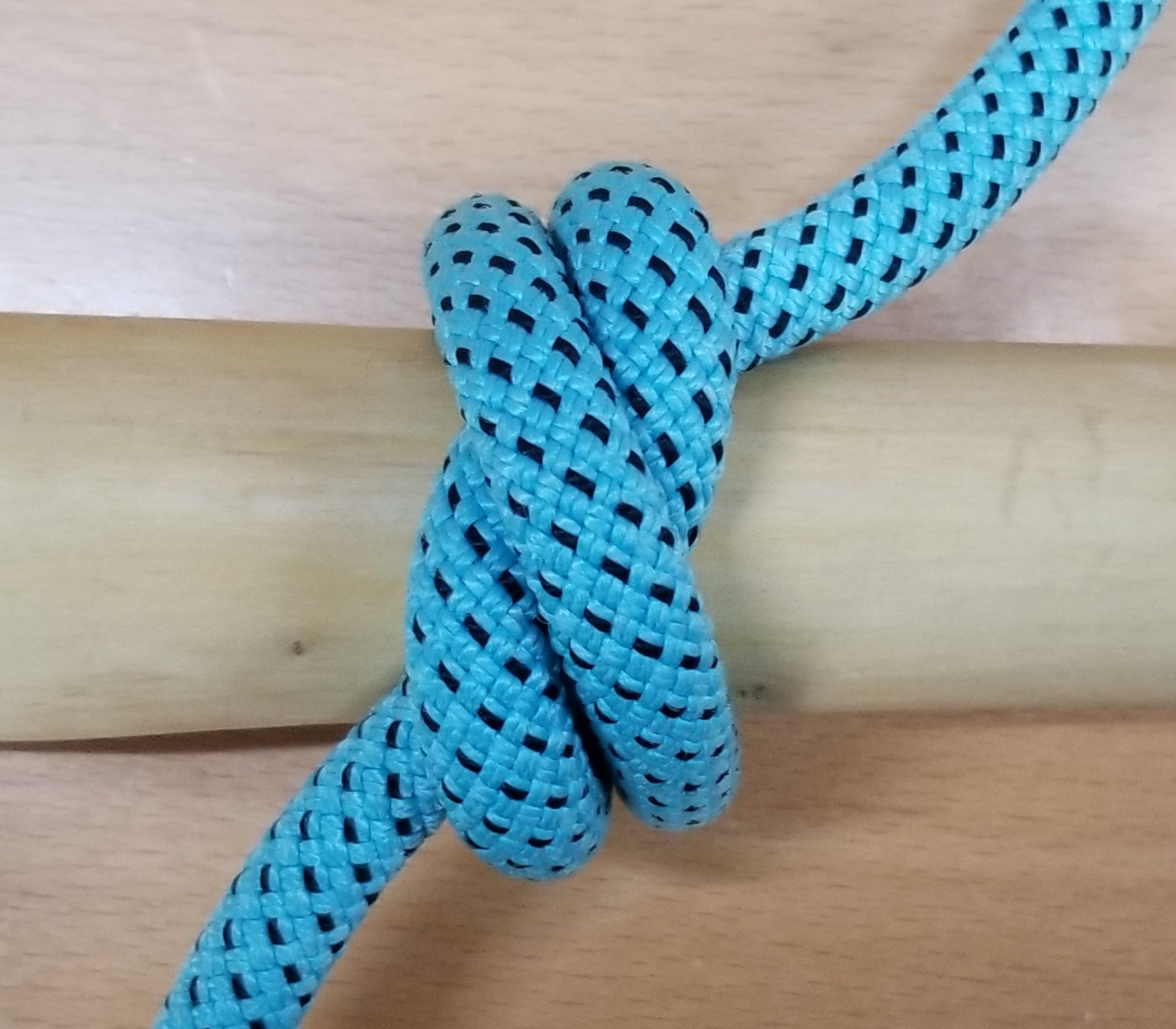
Strangle knot

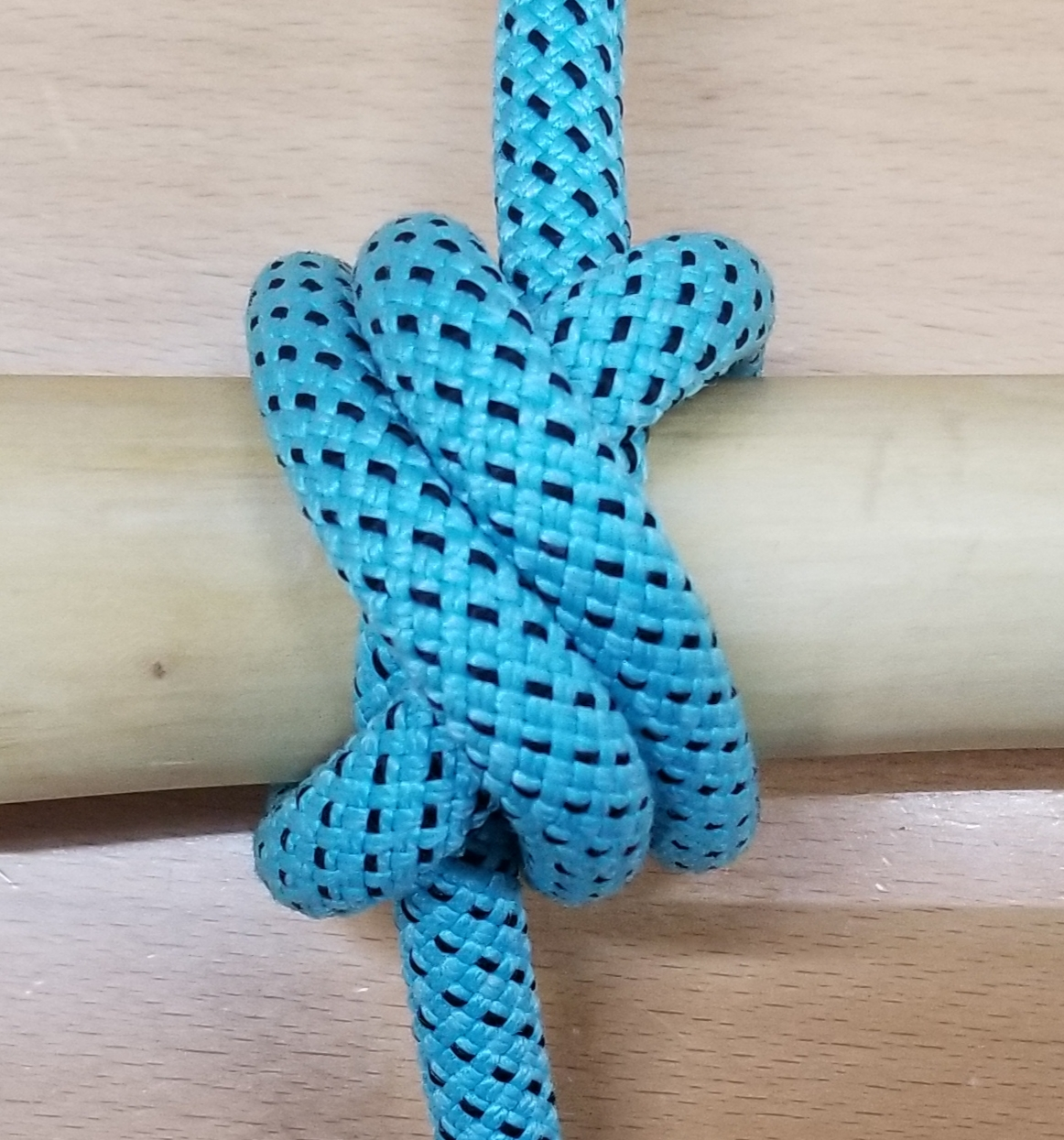
Double constrictor knot

== See also ==
- List of knots
