= Reef knot =

Common binding knot

- Names: Reef knot, Square knot, Hercules knot, Double knot, brotherhood knot
- Category: Binding
- Origin: Ancient
- Related: Thief knot, Granny knot, Grief knot, Surgeon's knot, Shoelace knot
- Releasing: Jamming
- Typical use: Joining two ends of a single line to bind around an object.
- Caveat: Not secure as a bend unless secured by additional knots(ex: overhand). Spills easily if one of the free ends is pulled outward. Does not hold well if the two lines are not the same thickness.
- ABoK: #74, #75, #460, #1204, #1402, #2096, #2573, #2574, #2577, #2580
- Instructions

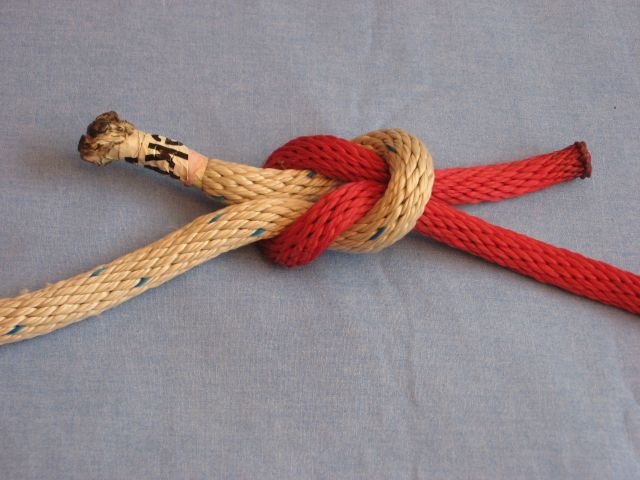
Photo of a tightened reef knot

The reef knot, or square knot, is an ancient and simple binding knot used to secure a rope or line around an object. It is sometimes also referred to as a Hercules knot or Heracles knot. The knot is formed by tying a left-handed overhand knot between two ends, instead of around one end, and then a right-handed overhand knot via the same procedure, or vice versa. A common mnemonic for this procedure is "right over left; left over right", which is often appended with the rhyming suffix "... makes a knot both tidy and tight". Two consecutive overhands tied as described above of the same handedness will make a weak granny knot. The working ends of the reef knot must emerge both at the top or both at the bottom, otherwise a very weak thief knot results.

The reef knot or square knot consists of two half knots, one left and one right, one being tied on top of the other, and either being tied first...The reef knot is unique in that it may be tied and tightened with both ends. It is universally used for parcels, rolls and bundles. At sea it is always employed in reefing and furling sails and stopping clothes for drying. But under no circumstances should it ever be tied as a bend, for if tied with two ends of unequal size, or if one end is stiffer or smoother than the other, the knot is almost bound to spill. Except for its true purpose of binding it is a knot to be shunned.

— The Ashley Book of Knots

The reef knot is not recommended for tying two ropes together, because of the potential instability of the knot when not stabilized; this has resulted in many accidental deaths (see Misuse as a bend).

== Naming ==
The reef knot is at least 4,000 years old. The name "reef knot" dates from at least 1794 and originates from its common use to reef sails, that is to tie part of the sail down to decrease its effective surface area in strong winds. The name "square knot" is found in Dana's 1841 maritime compendium A Seaman's Friend, which also gives "reef knot" as an alternative name.

The name square knot is often used for the unslipped version of reef knot. Reef knot itself then is understood as the single slipped version, while the name shoelace knot is to indicate double slipped version.

Sometimes the name bowtie also may be used to indicate a double slipped version, but tying a bowtie is usually performed on flat material, and involves a slip knot of one end holding a bight of the other end i.e. not really a double slipped reef knot.

The name "Square knot" is also used for completely different other knots such as the mathematical concept of square knot, or friendship knot; this last one earns the name by being flat and drawing a square on one face (and a cross on the other face).

== Uses ==
The reef knot is used to tie the two ends of a single rope together such that they will secure something, for example a bundle of objects, that is unlikely to move much.

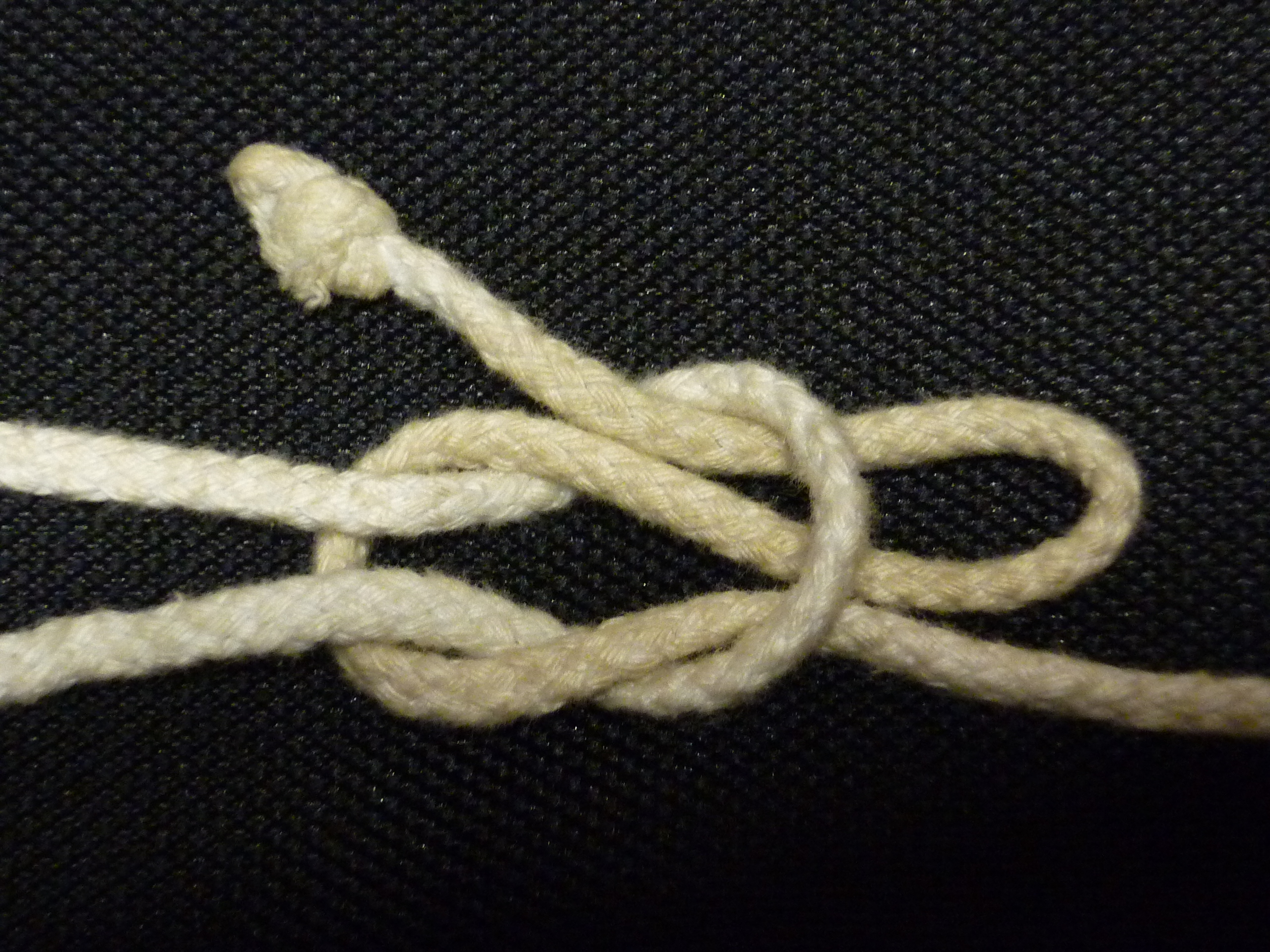
singly slipped reef knot

The single slipped version is used by sailors for reefing and furling sails. To release the knot a sailor could collapse it with a pull of one hand on the slipped end. The sail's weight would make the collapsed knot come apart. It is specifically this behavior which makes the knot unsafe for connecting two ropes together.

The reef knot is also one of the key knots of macrame textiles.

The knot lies flat when made with cloth and has been used for tying bandages for millennia. As a bandage knot it was known to the ancient Greeks as the Hercules knot (Herakleotikon hamma). and is still used extensively in medicine. In his Natural History, Pliny relates the belief that wounds heal more quickly when bound with a Hercules knot.

It has also been used since ancient times to tie belts and sashes. A modern use in this manner includes tying the obi (or belt) of a martial arts keikogi.

shoelace bow knot

With both ends slipped it becomes a good way to tie shoelaces, whilst the non-slipped version is useful for shoelaces that are excessively short. It is appropriate for tying plastic garbage or trash bags, as the knot forms a handle when tied in two twisted edges of the bag.

A surgeon's variation, used where a third hand is unavailable, is made with two or three twists of the ropes on bottom, and sometimes on top, instead of just one.

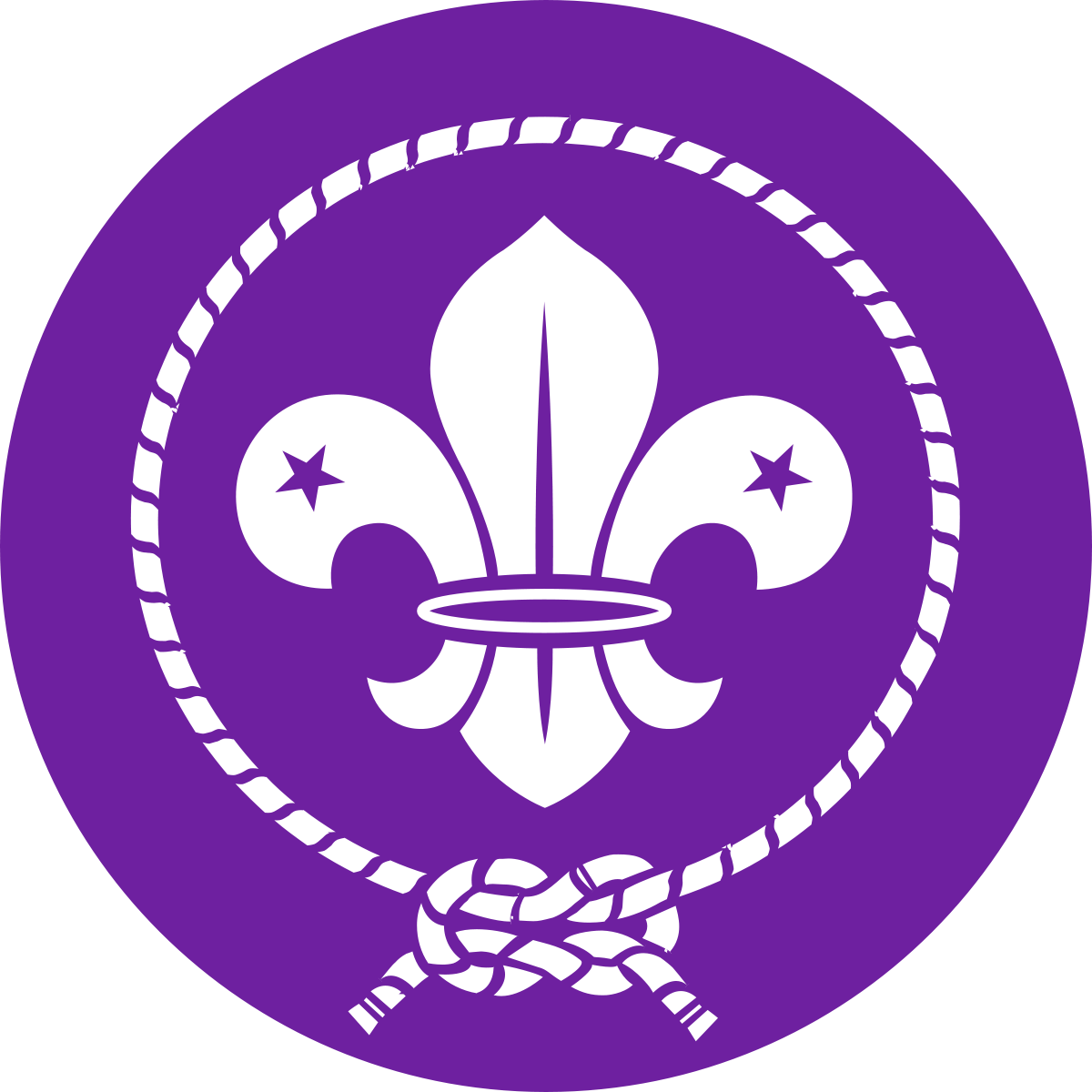
World Scout Emblem

The reef knot figures prominently in Scouting worldwide. It is included in the international membership badge and many scouting awards. In Pioneering (Scouting), it is commonly used as a binding knot to finish off specialized lashing (ropework) and whipping knots. However, it is an insecure knot, unstable when jiggled, and is not suitable for supporting weight.

== Gallery ==
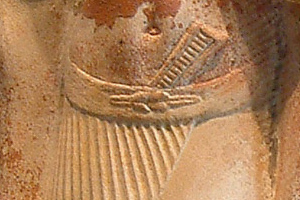
Detail of Egyptian statue dating from 2350 BC depicting a reef knot securing a belt

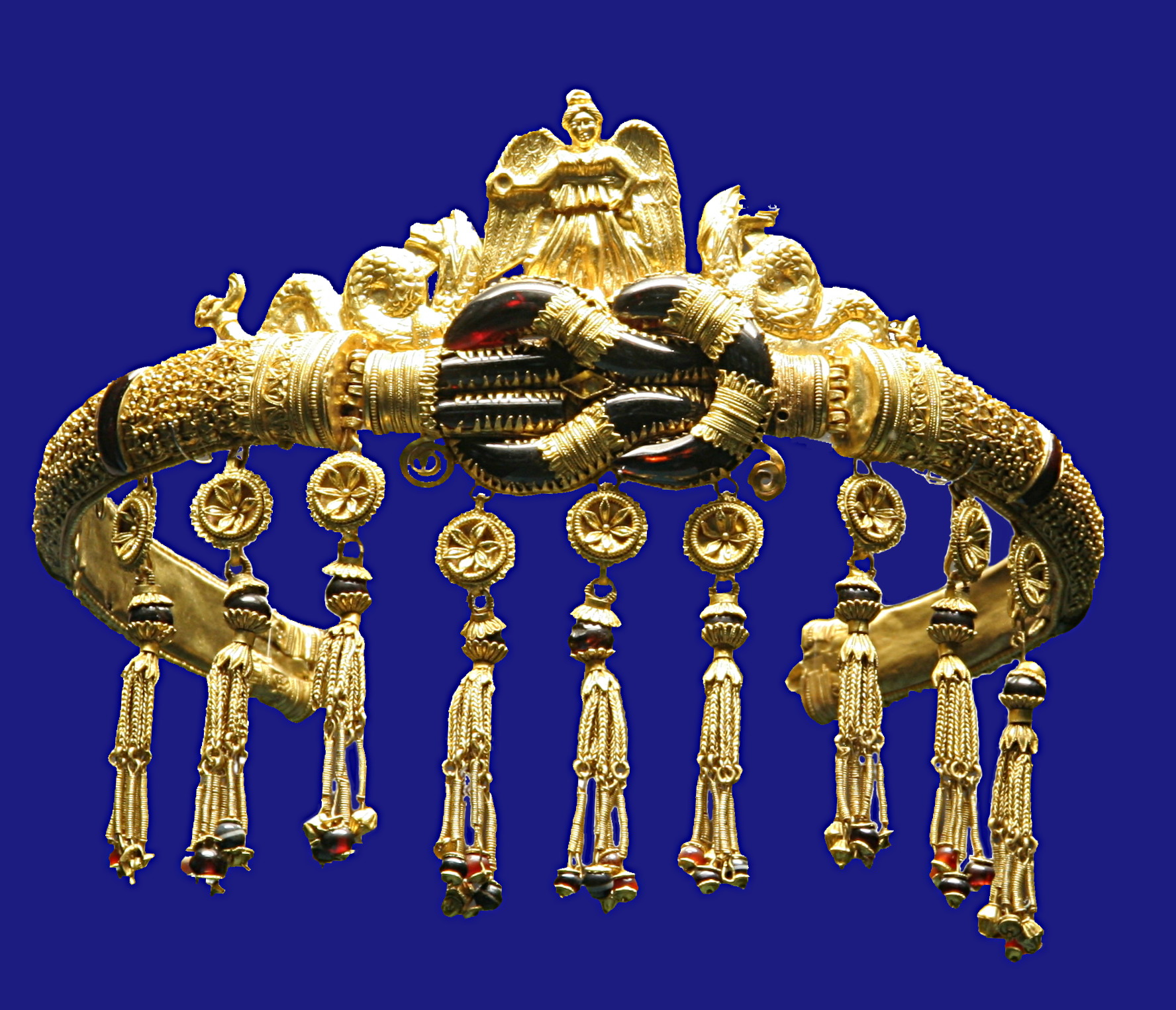
Ancient Greek jewelry from Pontika (Ukraine), 300 BC, in the form of a reef knot

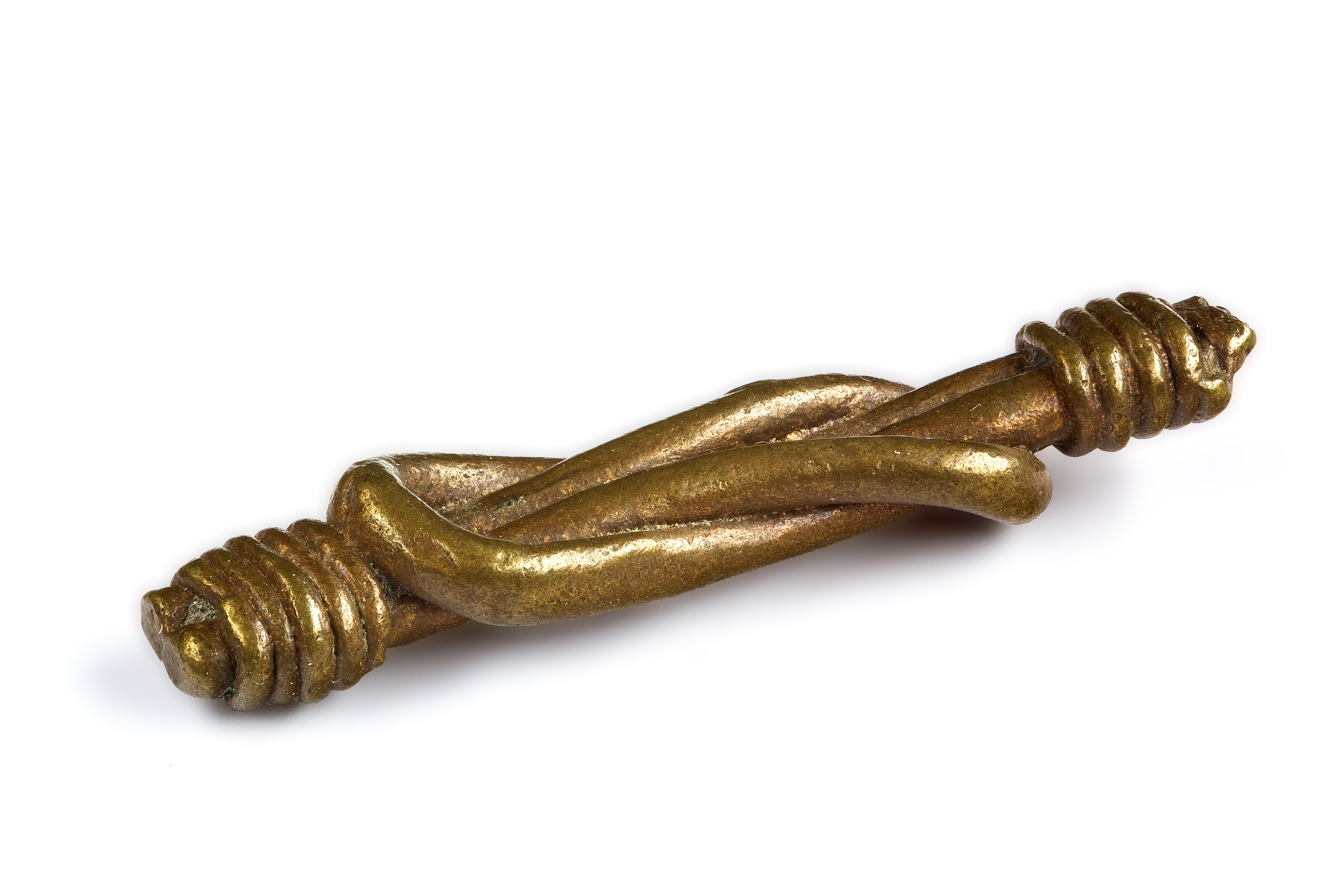
Weight for weighing gold dust - Knot – MHNT

== Misuse as a bend ==
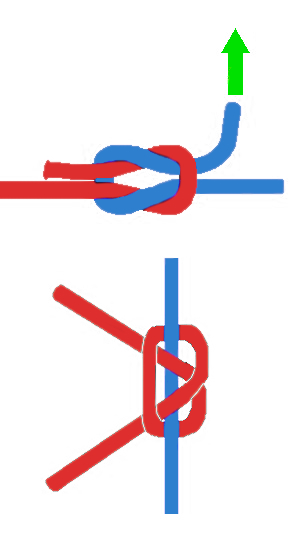
The reef knot can capsize (spill) when one of the free ends is pulled outward.

The reef knot's familiarity, ease of tying, and visually appealing symmetry conceal its weakness. The International Guild of Knot Tyers warns that this knot should never be used to bend two ropes together. However, modern instruction teaches that it is fine for noncritical applications, especially if stabilized. A proper bend knot, for instance a sheet bend or double fisherman's knot, should be used instead. Knotting authority Clifford Ashley claimed that failures of misused reef knots have caused more deaths and injuries than failures of all other knots combined. Further, it is easily confused with the granny knot, which is a very poor knot.

== Physical analysis ==
An approximate physical analysis predicts that a reef knot will hold if $2\mu e^{\mu\pi} \ge 1$, where μ is the relevant coefficient of friction. This inequality holds if $\mu \gtrsim 0.24$. Experiments show that the critical value of μ is actually somewhat lower.

== Related knots ==
Reef (square) knot

Thief knot

Granny knot

Grief knot

Surgeon's knot

== See also ==
- Aberdeen knot (German Wikipedia)
- Shoelace knot
- Granny knot
- Thief knot
- Surgeon's knot
- List of binding knots
- List of knots
- Square knot (emblem or insignia)
- Reefing
