= Seizing =

Type of stopping knot

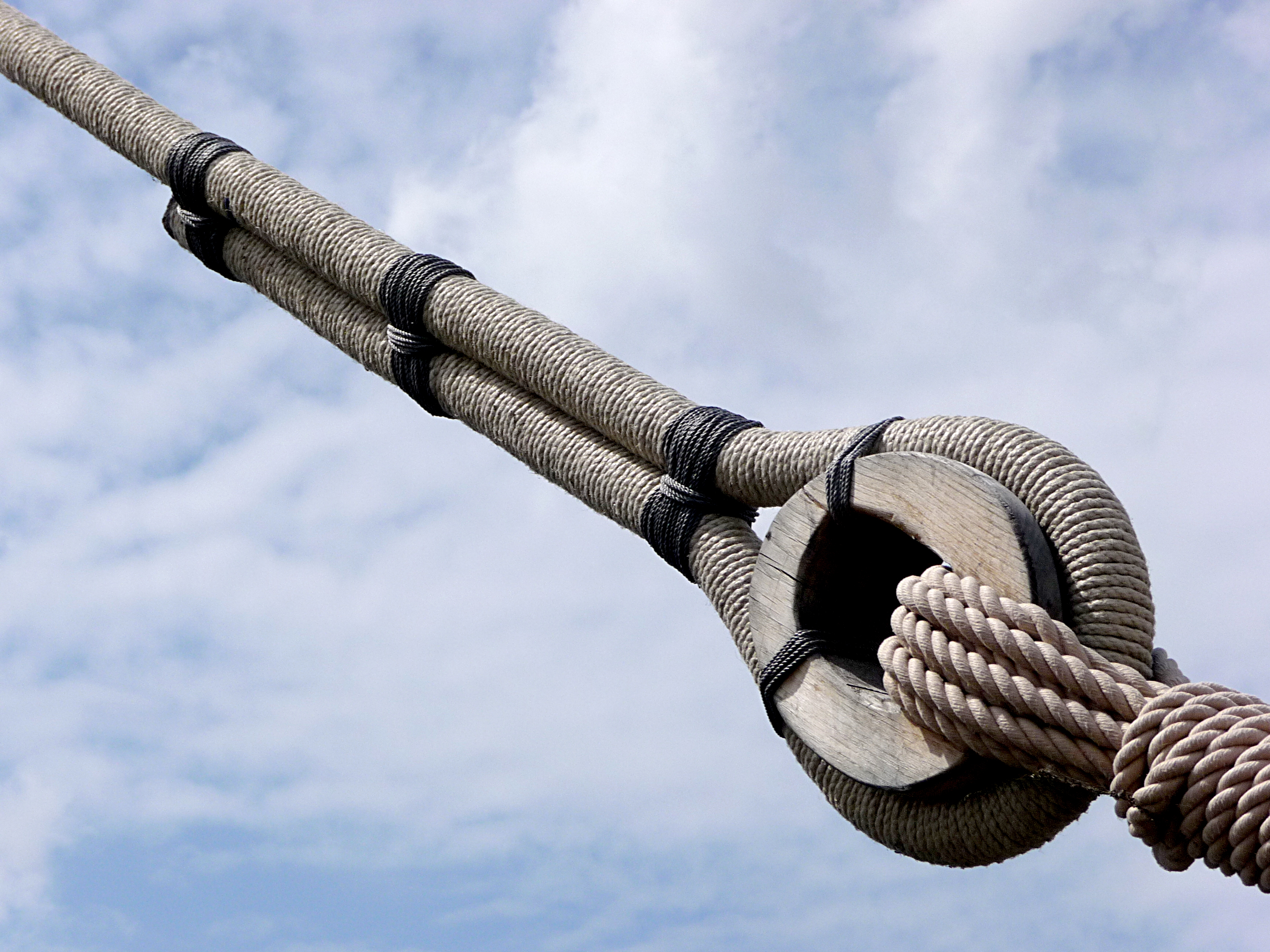
The eye of a forestay secured with three round seizings

Seizings are a class of stopping knots used to semi-permanently bind together two ropes, two parts of the same rope, or rope and another object. Akin to lashings, they use string or small-stuff to produce friction and leverage to immobilize larger ropes. Seizings are not recommended for heavy loads for critical use as strain reduces the diameter of the main rope and can permit slippage even with proper construction. According to The Ashley Book of Knots, "A seizing holds several objects together." The other type of stopping knots are whipping knots.

A throat seizing is a seized round turn. It is used when turning in deadeyes, and has riding turns but no crossing turns. The end of the stay or shroud should first be stopped around the deadeye. -- The Ashley Book of Knots

== See also ==
- Ropework
