= Surgeon's knot =

Type of knot

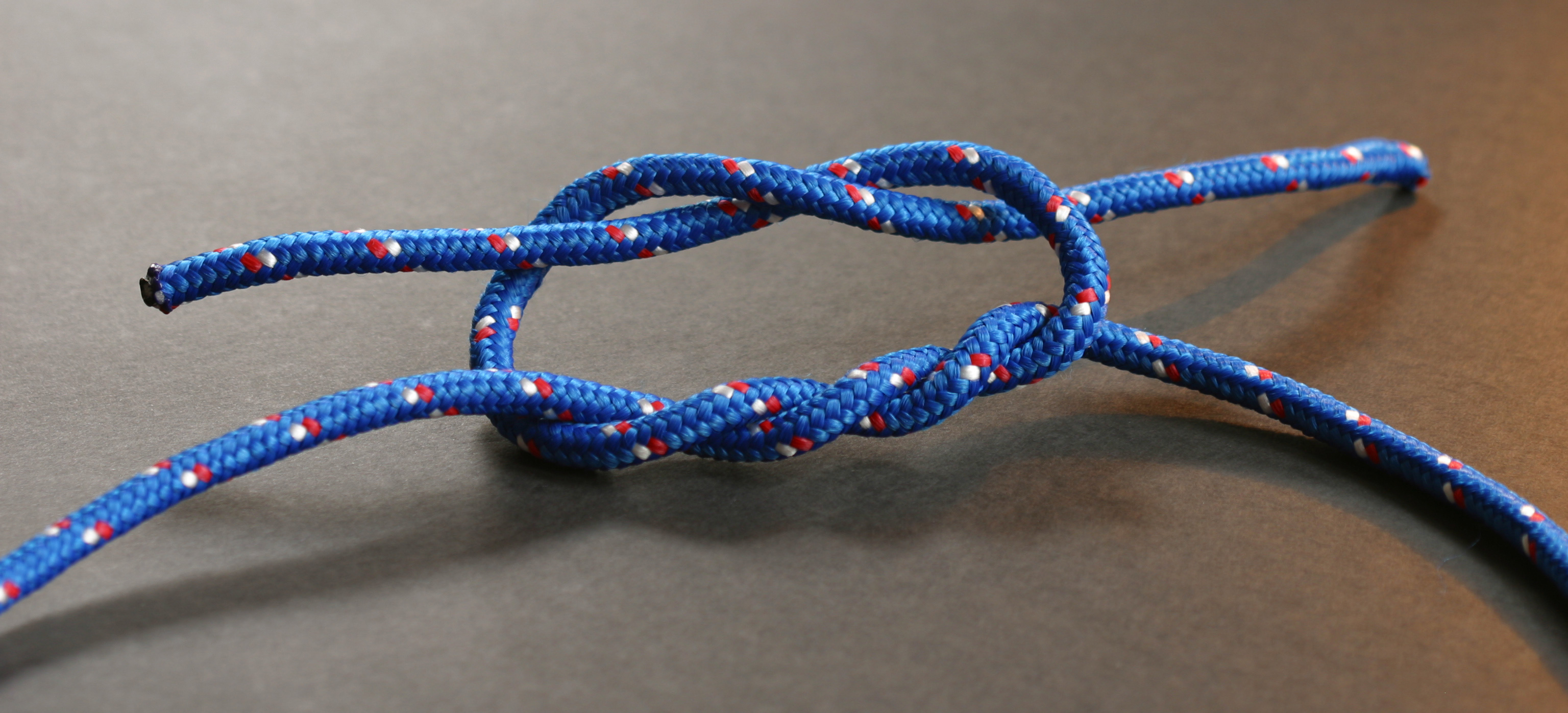
- The surgeon's knot before tightening showing the two twists in the bottom and the one on top
- Names: Surgeon's knot, Ligature knot
- Category: Binding
- Category 2: Bend
- Related: reef knot, Double overhand knot
- ABoK: #461, #463, #1209

The surgeon's knot is a surgical knot and is a simple modification to the reef knot. It adds an extra twist when tying the first throw, forming a double overhand knot. The additional turn provides more friction and can reduce loosening while the second half of the knot is tied. This knot is commonly used by surgeons in situations where it is important to maintain tension on a suture, giving it its name.

Surgeon's knots are also used in fly fishing, in tying quilts, and for tying knots with twine; it is particularly useful in tying raw meat with butcher's twine, as the wet meat creates similar risks of loosening as with surgery. Some sources categorize the surgeon's knot as a bend, since it can be effective as such.

Like the reef knot, the surgeon's knot capsizes and fails if one of the working ends is pulled away from the standing end closest to it.

== Additional image ==
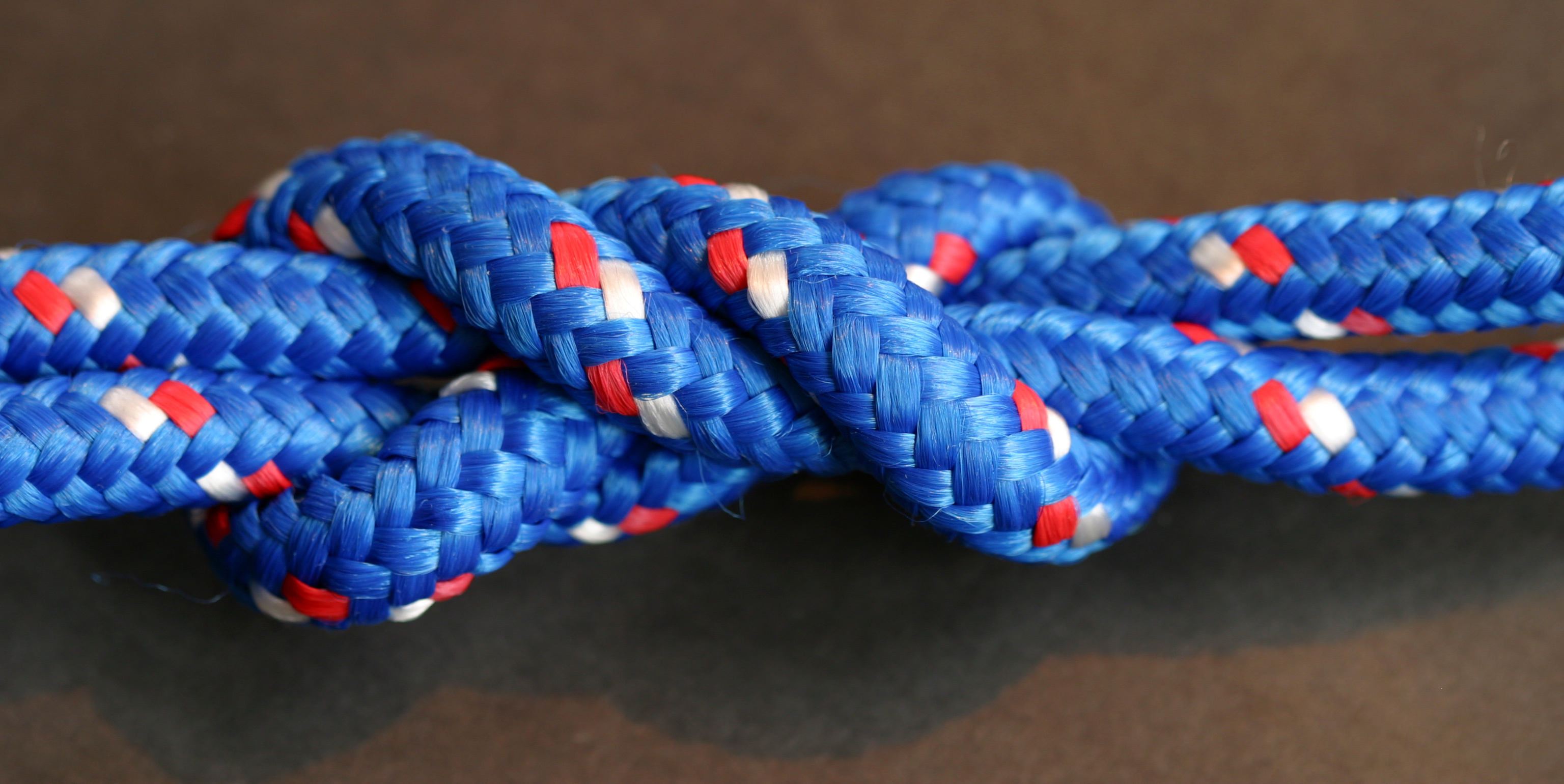
A surgeon's knot tied in nylon rope and tightened

Diagram of a surgeon's knot

Diagram of a reef knot

== See also ==
- List of bend knots
- List of binding knots
- List of knots
