= Ashley's bend =

Type of knot

Ashley's Bend
- Names: Ashley's Bend, Ashley bend
- Category: Bend
- Origin: The Ashley Book of Knots
- Related: Alpine butterfly bend, Hunter's bend, Zeppelin bend, Butterfly loop, Trident loop
- Releasing: Jamming possible
- Typical use: temporary joining of similar-sized cords & ropes
- ABoK: #1452, #1408

Ashley's bend is a knot used to securely join the ends of two ropes together. It is similar to several related bend knots which consist of two interlocking overhand knots, and in particular the alpine butterfly bend. These related bends differ by the way the two constituent overhand knots are interlocked.

== History ==
The name "Ashley's bend" is now associated with the knot described in entry #1452 of The Ashley Book of Knots. Clifford Ashley developed this bend and believed it to be original, along with several similar ones. Rather than giving it a name he simply noted the date when he first tied it: "(2/3/34.)". Cyrus L. Day, a contemporary of Ashley's, called the knot by the name "Ashley's Bend" in his 1947 book The Art of Knotting & Splicing just a few years after the publication of Ashley's book. Later authors have continued to use this name.

== Security ==
In the 1930s, Ashley performed security tests on a number of bends for the Collins and Aikman company. The manufacturer wanted a bend that would not slip when tied in mohair, a stiff slippery material. The jerk testing Ashley performed placed his bend, #1452, equal to the barrel knot in exhibiting no slippage at all. All other bends he tested slipped to some extent, and most failed completely in less than 100 loading cycles.

== Jamming behavior ==
Most references fail to distinguish the distinct ways in which the two ends of the knot can be dressed. As the two working ends emerge from the knot, they make a sort of vortex that twists the tails in one direction; the tails can be oriented such that they are twisted ever tighter together, or put on the other side of each other in which case the setting of the knot can lead to a jamming state.

== Uses ==
This knot belongs to a group of knots formed by interlocking overhand knots. Its purpose is to securely join two ropes of similar thickness. Ashley's testing confirmed its reliability with minimal slipping tendencies. One needs to dress the knot correctly for easy loosening when expecting a heavy load.

== See also ==
- List of bend knots
- List of knots
- Knot theory
