= Trident loop =

Fixed loop knot which can jam when heavily loaded

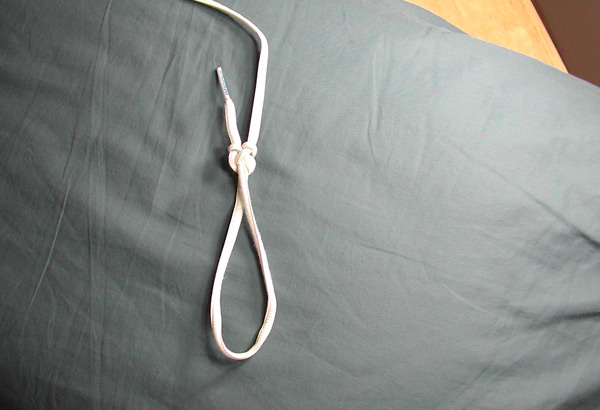
- Category: Loop
- Related: Ashley's bend, Figure-eight knot, Zeppelin loop
- Typical use: Forming fixed loop in end of a line

The trident loop is a fixed loop knot which can jam when heavily loaded. It was proposed as a replacement for the figure-of-eight loop for use in climbing by Robert M. Wolfe, MD, who developed it as a loop form of Ashley's bend. While some tests indicate its strength lies somewhere between the weaker Bowline and stronger figure-of-eight loop, the trident loop shows exceptional resistance to slipping in shock-loading tests.

== Tying ==
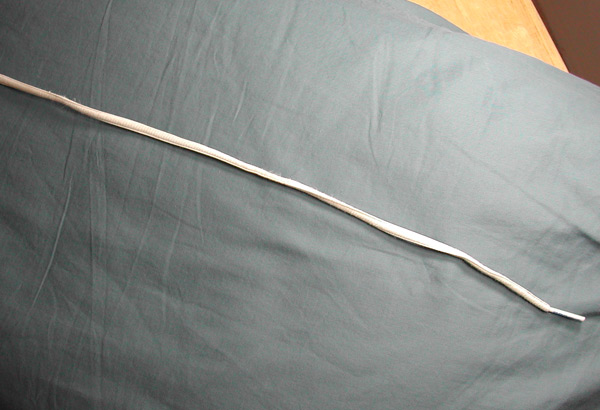
1. Start with a rope end.

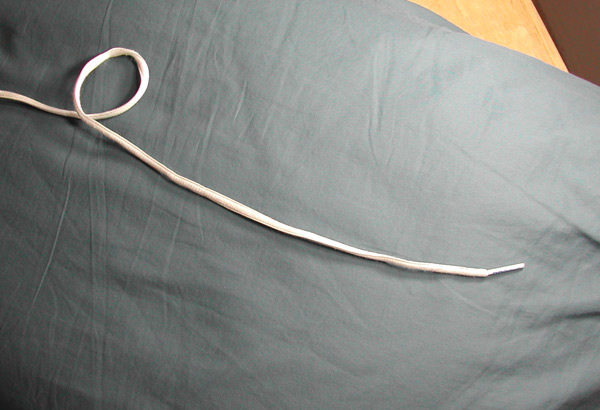
2. Start an overhand knot, leaving enough rope for the loop and the rest of the knot.

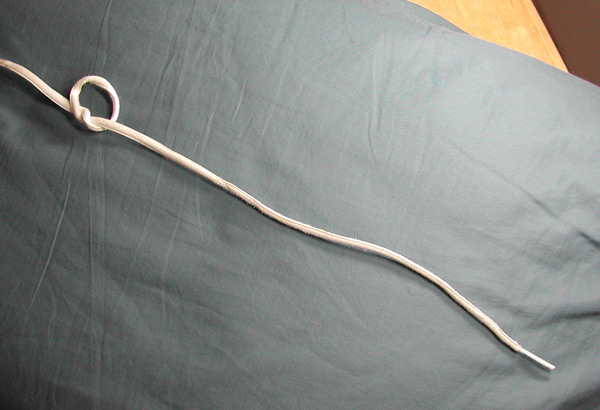
3. Complete the overhand knot.

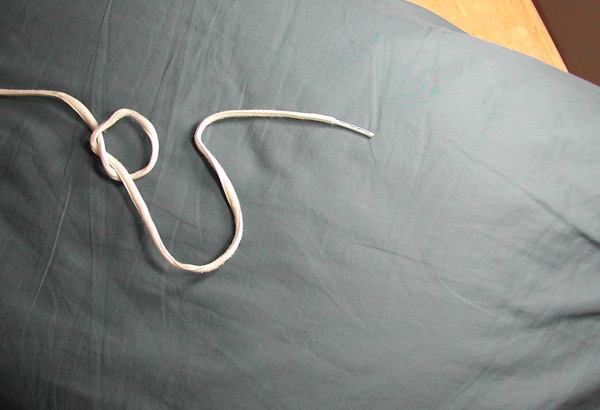
4. Form the loop by wrapping the working end around, and then form a bight in the working end.

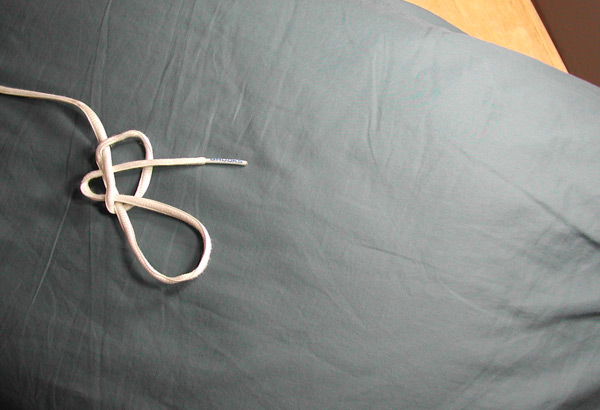
5. Feed the bight through the overhand knot.

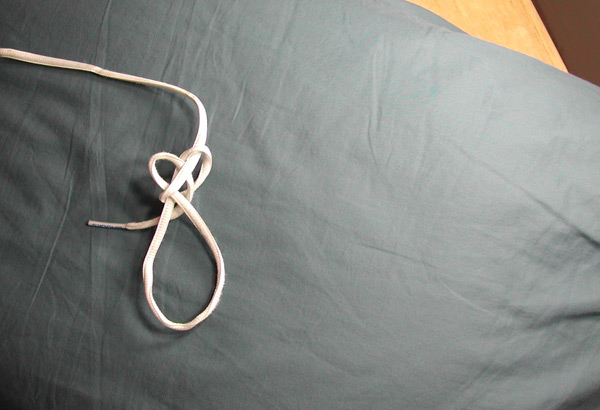
6. Wrap the remaining working end around the back of the knot.

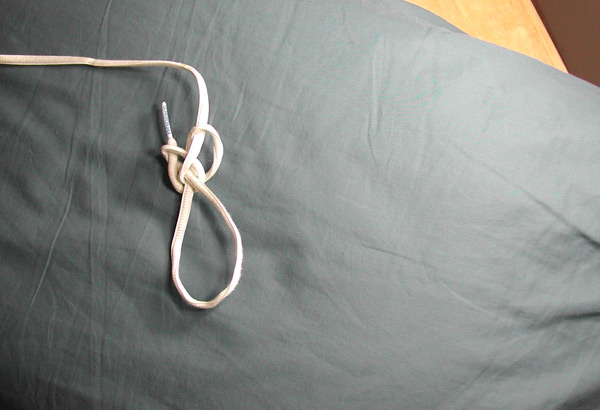
7. Feed the working end up through the bight.

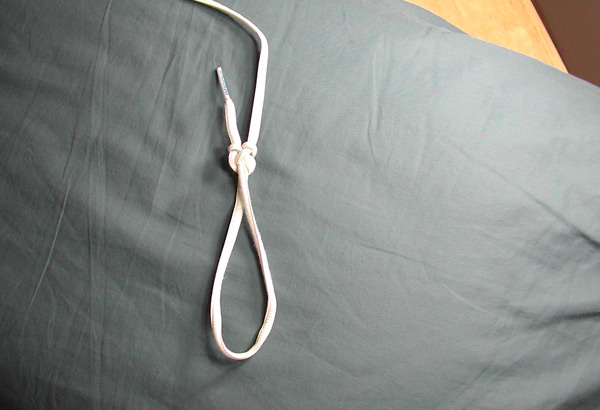
8. Tighten. This is the completed loop.

== See also ==
- List of knots
