= Hunter's bend =

Type of knot

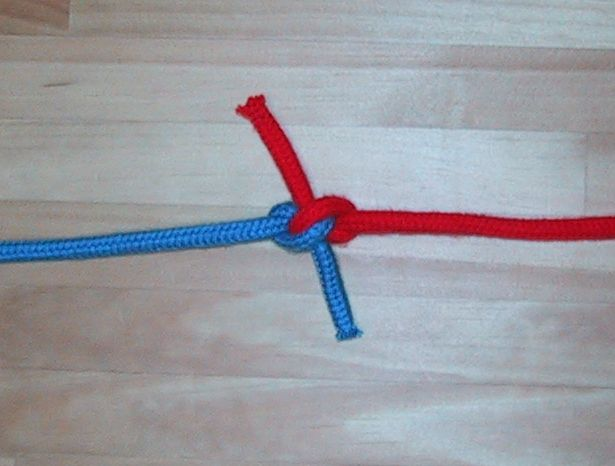
- Names: Hunter's bend, Rigger's bend
- Category: Bend
- Related: Alpine butterfly bend, Zeppelin bend, Zeppelin loop, Ashley's bend
- Typical use: easily-untied bend for rigging and mooring
- ABoK: #1425A

Hunter's bend (or rigger's bend) is a knot used to join two lines. It consists of interlocking overhand knots, and can jam under moderate strain. It is similar to the Zeppelin bend.

When assessed against other bends in stress tests using paracord, it was found to be "not as strong as the blood knot, similar to the reverse figure of eight and stronger than the fisherman's bend, sheet bend or reef knot".

== History ==
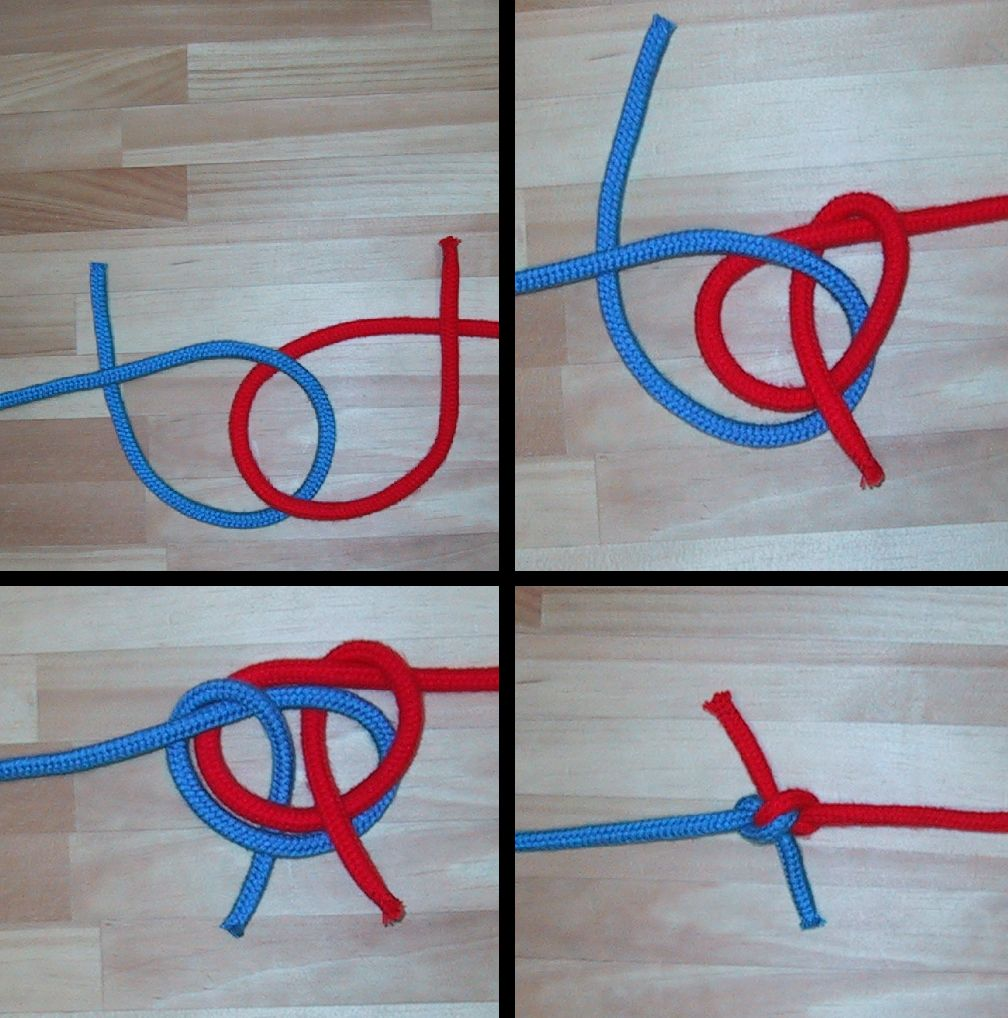

In October 1978, an article in The Times presented it as a newly invented knot credited to Dr. Edward Hunter. He had used it for years to tie broken shoelaces before discovering its originality through a friend in the 1970s. When it appeared on the front page, it led to much publicity for the knot and also to the formation of the International Guild of Knot Tyers.

It was later pointed out by Amory Bloch Lovins that the knot had already been presented in Knots for Mountaineering by Phil D. Smith in the 1950s. The tying of the bend was described as a modification to the alpine butterfly bend. Smith had devised the knot in 1943 while working on the San Francisco waterfront and had called it simply a "rigger's bend".

Although not documented in the original 1944 print of The Ashley Book of Knots, it was later added in 1979 as entry #1425A.

== See also ==
- List of knots
- Zeppelin bend
- List of bend knots
