= Clifford Warren Ashley =

American artist, author, sailor, and knot expert

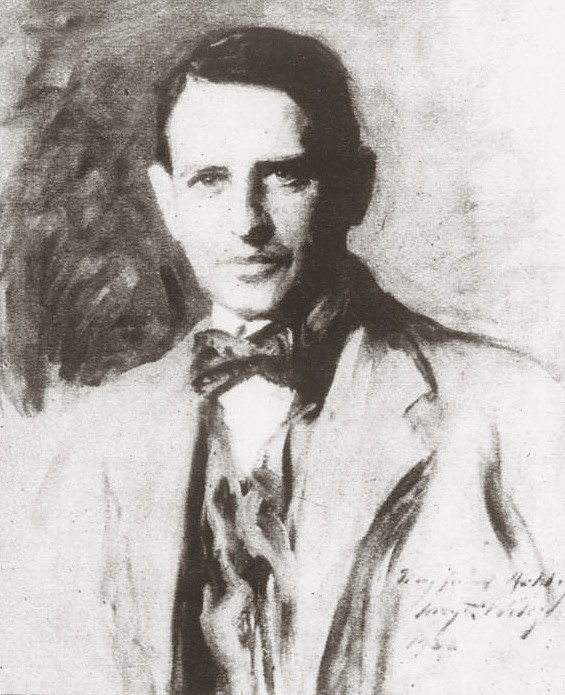
- Portrait sketch of Clifford Warren Ashley, c. 1927
- Born: December 18, 1881; New Bedford, Massachusetts
- Died: September 18, 1947 (aged 65); Westport Point, Massachusetts
- Burial place: Oak Grove Cemetery, New Bedford, Massachusetts; 41.6442°N 70.9425°W
- Occupations: Author, artist, sailor
- Years active: 1901-1944
- Notable work: The Ashley Book of Knots
- Children: 3 (1 adopted)
- Parents: Abiel Davis Ashley (father); Caroline Morse (mother)

Clifford Warren Ashley (December 18, 1881 – September 18, 1947) was an American artist, author, sailor, and knot expert.

== Life ==
Ashley was born in New Bedford, Massachusetts, son of Abiel Davis Ashley and Caroline Morse Ashley. He married Sarah Scudder Clark in 1932, with whom he had two daughters, one of whom is practicing painter Jane Ashley. He also adopted his wife's daughter from a previous marriage. He died in Westport Point, Massachusetts in 1947, two years after having a debilitating stroke.

== Education and early work ==
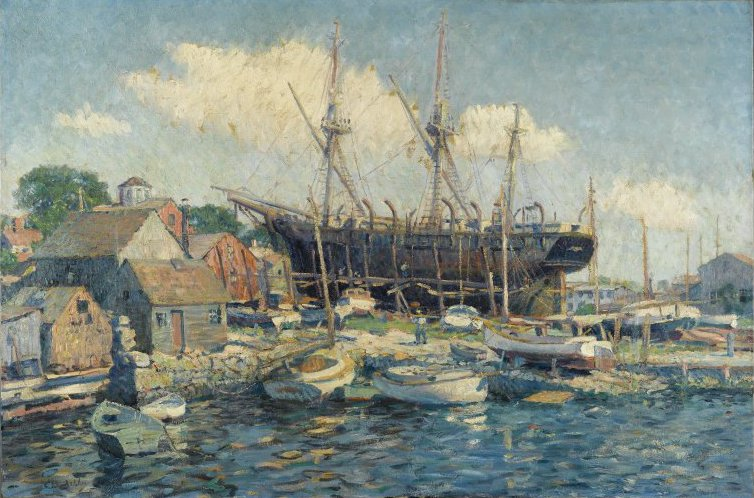
A Whaleship on the Marine Railway at Fairhaven (c. 1916)

Taking an interest in art while still in high school, he went on to attend the Eric Pape Art School in Boston. In the summer of 1901 Ashley, along with friends N.C. Wyeth and Henry J. Peck, studied under George Noyes in Annisquam, Massachusetts. In the fall, he went on to become a student of Howard Pyle's school in Wilmington, Delaware. Pyle helped secure commissions for his students, and Ashley's early work included book frontispieces and illustrations for magazines such as The Delineator, Leslies, McClure's, and Success.

Ashley had both a knowledge of and interest in sperm whaling due to his upbringing in New Bedford. In 1904 he was commissioned by Harper's Monthly Magazine to write and illustrate a two-part article on whaling. This project necessitated him becoming even more familiar with the topic. To this end he set sail aboard the bark Sunbeam for six weeks, beginning in August of that year. During the voyage he witnessed the hunt and killing of three whales. Upon publication, the master of the Sunbeam praised the articles, stating, "I think it is the best whale story I ever read ... The illustrations are so true to life that even the Old Barnacles here cannot find fault with them."

== Writings ==
Ashley is perhaps most famous for The Ashley Book of Knots (1944), an encyclopedic reference manual with directions and descriptions for and illustrations of 3,857 knots. He was the first author to publish several knots, including what are now called Ashley's stopper knot and Ashley's bend.

Ashley's initial foray as a knot author occurred with the 1925 publication of a series of articles in a Street & Smith pulp called Sea Stories Magazine. While far less expansive than his later magnum opus, the articles have stylistic elements that Ashley would use again. This includes symbols adjacent to some illustrations to indicate the characteristics or shortcomings of particular knots. In 1935 Cyrus Day, a knot author and correspondent of Ashley's, cited the series of six articles in his own work as, "...the best discussion of knots available in English, but out of print, and difficult to obtain." The Sea Stories articles were collected, reset and published by the International Guild of Knot Tyers as The Sailor and His Knots in 2012.

In 1922, Ashley was granted Patent US1433868A for "A novel method whereby sennits of any desired cross-sectional shape may be plaited without the necessity for a core." The explanation given in the Ashley Book of Knots is, "...when my attention was called to the fact that Matthew Walker alone of all past knot tiers still holds credit for his invention, I went to the trouble of patenting my sinnet."

Ashley also wrote The Yankee Whaler (1926) and The Whaleships of New Bedford (1929), studies of sperm whaling in New England in the late 18th century and early 19th century.

== Memoria ==
Mount Ashley, standing south of the Bay of Isles on South Georgia Island, is named after Ashley.
