= Butterfly bend =

Knot to join the ends of two ropes together

Butterfly Bend
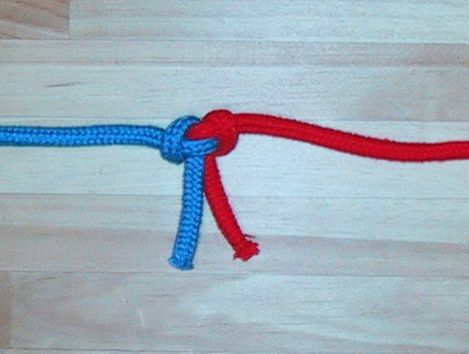
- Names: Butterfly Bend, Strait bend
- Category: Bend
- Related: butterfly loop, Hunter's bend, Zeppelin bend, Ashley's bend
- Releasing: Non-jamming
- Caveat: Errors in tying can result in a similar looking but insecure bend
- Instructions

The butterfly bend is a knot used to join the ends of two ropes together. It is the analogous bend form of the butterfly loop, in that it is the butterfly loop with the loop cut. The observation that the butterfly loop is secure enough to isolate a worn or damaged section of rope within the loop indicated that the bend form of the knot would be similarly secure.

== History ==
When Phil D. Smith made the first known presentation of the Hunter's bend in 1953 (under the name "rigger's bend"), he described it as a modification to the butterfly bend. While the bend form had been known to mountaineers, nautical rigger Brion Toss brought the knot to a wider audience when he published it in 1975. Unaware of the earlier publication, Toss called the butterfly bend the strait bend after the Strait of Juan de Fuca.

== Tying ==
The butterfly bend can be tied using a subset of the methods used for tying the loop form by holding the two rope ends together and treating them as if they were a single bight. However, specific methods have been developed for tying the bend form directly, including the one shown below and characterizable using the mnemonic device "A d through a b; 'twixt the two and toward me":

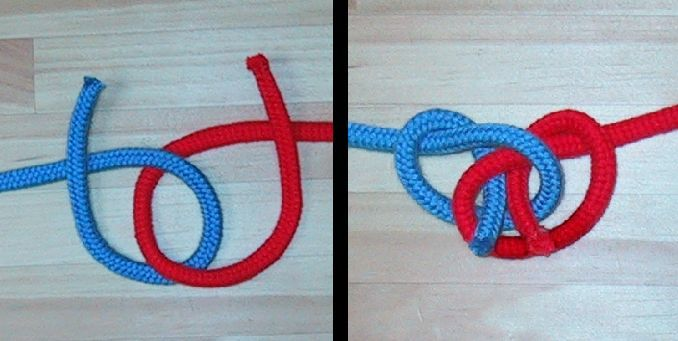
butterfly bend step by step

== Security ==
A properly tied butterfly bend should be as secure as the equivalent loop form. However, subtle positioning errors during the above shown tying method can result in a similar looking but insecure bend knot.

== See also ==
- Knot
- List of bend knots
- List of knots
