= International Guild of Knot Tyers =

Organization

- Founded: 17 April 1982; 44 years ago
- Founder: 25 Founding Members
- Type: Educational non-profit
- Purpose: Knots and knotting techniques
- Location: International
- Region served: Global
- Key people: Founders; Des Pawson and Geoffrey Budworth
- Website: http://www.igkt.net/

The International Guild of Knot Tyers (or IGKT) is a worldwide association for people with an interest in knots and knot tying.

== Formation and beginning ==
Officially established in 1982, the founding members were initially drawn together by the 1978 publication in The Times of an allegedly new knot, the Hunter's bend. The idea for a knotting association of some kind grew from the contact between two people. Des Pawson was a retail manager for a large stationery firm based in Ipswich and a knot craftsman. Geoffrey Budworth was a Metropolitan Police Inspector and knotting consultant. Des first wrote to Geoff on 8 October 1978. They met before the month was over, and if it was not mentioned then the idea of contacting other knotting enthusiasts was raised by Des in a letter dated July, 1980, when he pressed for a suitable venue and suggested The Maritime Trust. Even then, 1981 went by without further development; and this is a source of regret to them both as it was the centenary of Clifford W. Ashley's birth.

== Aims ==
=== 2013 Constitution ===
The object of the Guild shall be the advancement of education by the study of and practice of the art, craft and science of knotting, past and present. In furtherance of this object but not otherwise the Guild shall have the following powers:

- (a) To undertake research into all aspects of knotting and to publish the useful results.
- (b) To establish an authoritative body for consultation purposes
- (c) To publish a periodical or periodicals and other papers and books about knotcrafts and related subjects.
- (d) To form and maintain a library of books, papers, films, photographs and other materials about knotcrafts and related subjects, with a view to making information available to Members of the Guild, and to the general public.
- (e) To form a collection of knots and knotting and work related crafts.
- (f) To encourage the employment of knotcrafts as a manual activity in schools, and as a therapy among the physically handicapped
- (g) Research and development of innovative shoe-lace tying methods

The goals of the organization are to promote research and act as a source of reference and consultation on knots and knotting, preserve traditional techniques and promote an interest in the public, among others. Unlike a traditional guild no level of expertise is required for membership, only an interest in knotting.

Members of the Guild assisted with revisions and corrections to The Ashley Book of Knots in 1991.

== Knotting Matters ==
Knotting Matters is the quarterly news letter of the IGKT and is sent by post to all subscribed members. The first issue was published in autumn 1982 and was 17 pages long and in black and white, edited by Geoffrey Budworth. The centennial was produced in September 2008, edited by Lindsey Philpott, and was professionally printed with colour covers and was 50 pages in length. Knotting Matters is made from Guild members' submissions and other news from the guild.

== Founding members ==
The Guild dates from an inaugural meeting of 25 individuals aboard the Maritime Trust's vessel RRS Discovery berthed in St. Katharine Docks in the lee of Tower Bridge on April, 17th. 1982. Those in attendance were Dr. Harry Asher, Roy E. Bail, C.G. Bellingham, Geoffrey Budworth, John Constable, Bernard J. Cutbush, Anne Devine, Ron W. Evans, Sid Evans, Eric Franklin, Frank Harris, John Hawes, Paul Herbert, Edward Hunter, Jill Jenner, Albert Kirby, Allan McDowall, Desmond Mandeville, Graham Mott, Des Pawson, Liz Pawson, Douglas Probert, W. Ettrick Thomson, Don Woods, and Quinton Winch.

Percy Blandford sent apologies for being unable to attend. Fred Browne of Boston, Massachusetts (MIT), Robert Chisnall of Kingston, Ontario, Canada, and Charles H. S. Thomason of Queensland, Australia all expressed a wish to be involved from the outset but due to distance were unable to attend the opening meeting.

== International and local branches ==
- Alaskan Branch
- East Anglian Branch (UK)
- French Branch
- German Branch
- Midlands Branch (UK)
- Northwest Branch (UK)
- Netherlands
- New Zealand
- NAB Mid-Atlantic Region
- NAB Knot In the Middle
- Pacific Americas Branch
- Solent Branch
- Surrey Branch
- Southern Ontario Knot Tyers
- Sweden
- West Country Knotters (UK)
- West Yorkshire Branch (UK)

== Recognition ==
In 2001, archaeological historian Mike Loades attempted a reconstruction of a British Iron Age chariot. He called upon IGKT member Richard Hopkins for his knowledge and experience of how to use the binding and lashing materials available at that time – rawhide, hemp, and flax – and described his contribution to the project as "invaluable".

== Six knot challenge ==
This involves tying six basic knots – reef knot, sheet bend, sheepshank, clove hitch, round turn and two half-hitches and bowline – against the clock. The authenticated world record is 8.1 seconds, set by Clinton R. Bailey, Sr. in 1977. IGKT members have discussed proposals for formal rules to govern future attempts on this record.

== World Knot Tying Day ==
In 2018, the IGKT-Solent Branch promoted the idea of making the 18th of December World Knot Tying Day to celebrate and remember the author Clifford W. Ashley, who wrote and illustrated The Ashley Book of Knots. The date was selected to coincide with Ashley's birthday (1881). Participants were asked to tie their favorite knot and also learn a new knot. They were also encouraged to teach someone how to tie a knot. Even teaching someone to tie their shoelaces was sufficient. When the knots were tied, participants were encouraged to post a photo of their knot on their favorite social media site with the hashtag #WorldKnotTyingDay. In 2020, the IGKT shifted the day of the celebration to September 18. This date coincides with the day Ashley died (1947).

== See also ==
- List of knots
- Category:Knots
