= The Ashley Book of Knots =

1944 encyclopedia of knots by Clifford W. Ashley

- Cover illustration by George Giguere shows a sailor displaying a Tom fool's knot
- Author: Clifford W. Ashley
- Illustrator: Clifford W. Ashley
- Cover artist: George Giguere
- Language: English
- Subject: Knots
- Genre: Reference work
- Publisher: Doubleday
- Publication date: 1944
- Publication place: United States
- Pages: 638
- ISBN: 0-385-04025-3

The Ashley Book of Knots (ABoK) is an encyclopedia of knots written and illustrated by the American sailor and artist Clifford W. Ashley. First published in 1944, it was the culmination of over 11 years of work. The book contains 3,857 numbered entries and approximately 7,000 illustrations. The entries include knot instructions, uses, and some histories, categorized by type or function. It remains one of the most important and comprehensive books on knots.

== Use as a reference ==
Due to its scope and wide availability, The Ashley Book of Knots has become a significant reference work in the field of knotting. The numbers Ashley assigned to each knot can be used to unambiguously identify them. This helps to identify knots despite local colloquialisms or identification changes. Citations to Ashley numbers are usually in the form: "The Constrictor Knot (ABoK #1249)", "ABoK #1249", or even simply "#1249" if the context of the reference is clear or already established.

Some knots have more than one Ashley number due to having multiple uses or forms. For example, the main entry for #1249 is in the chapter on binding knots but it is also listed as #176 in a chapter on occupational knot usage.

The Ashley Book of Knots was compiled and first published before the introduction of synthetic fiber ropes, during a time when natural fiber cordage – typically twisted, laid, or braided rope – was most commonly used. The commentary on some knots may fail to address their behavior when tied with modern synthetic fiber or kernmantle style ropes.

== Corrections and additions ==
In the first edition, three entries have non-integer numbers: 794.5, 1034.5, 2585.5. Also, entry number 2545 contains no knot, reading only "This knot was mislaid".

Ashley suffered a debilitating stroke the year after the book was published. He was not able to produce an erratum nor oversee a corrected edition.

In 1979, at least one knot was added, the Hunter's bend (#1425A).

In 1991, corrections submitted by the International Guild of Knot Tyers were incorporated. The original list of revisions submitted to the publisher is believed to have been lost, but many had been collected from a series of articles in Knotting Matters, the Guild's quarterly publication. Additional errors have been identified since the 1991 corrections.

== Cultural references ==
The Ashley Book of Knots is quoted extensively in the novel The Shipping News (1993) by E. Annie Proulx, with its descriptions and illustrations of various knots providing the chapter headings. In the novel's acknowledgements, Proulx writes that "without the inspiration of Clifford W. Ashley's wonderful 1944 work, The Ashley Book of Knots, which I had the good fortune to find at a yard sale for a quarter, this book would have remained just a thread of an idea."
