= Zeppelin loop =

Form of loop knot

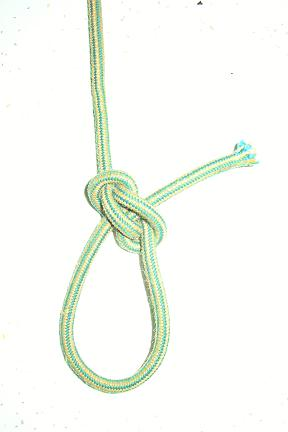
- Names: Zeppelin loop, Rosendahl loop
- Category: Loop
- Related: Zeppelin bend

A zeppelin eye knot, is a secure, jam resistant fixed size loop knot based on the zeppelin bend. It is one of the few eye knots suitable for bungee. It is also special in its ease of untying.

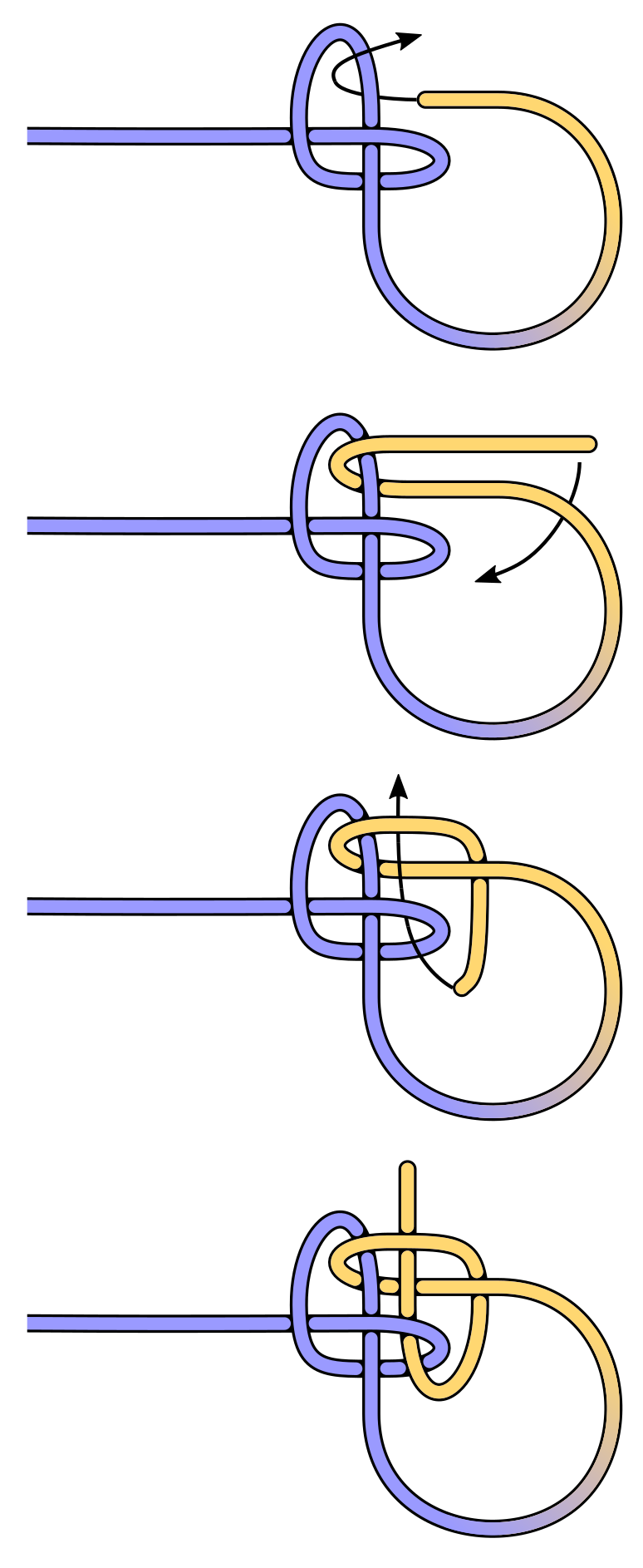
Tying the Zeppelin loop

== Tying ==
Virtually all bends (i.e. end-to-end joining knots) have a corresponding 'eye knot'. For example, the Sheet bend (ABoK #1431) has a corresponding eye knot which is none other than the common (#1010) Bowline. The Zeppelin bend is formed from 2 superposed loops of opposite chirality.

There are two versions of the zeppelin eye knot depending on how it is tied.

- The first version where the end seems to be vertical to the main part, and one of the loop sides seems to be the continuation of the main part, while the other loop side seems to continue as the working end out of the loop knot. This version is tied using the clover method, starting with an overhand knot, then letting the working end pass in the following order through
  1. first the eye of the clover (overhand knot) on the main part side along with the main part (thus forming the loop)
  2. then the loop itself opposite the direction of the main part
  3. and last the other eye of the clover knot in the opposite direction of the exiting working end (loop side)
- The other version where the end seems to be the continuation of the main part, and both ends of the loop seems to be vertical to the main part. This version is tied using the clover method, starting with an underhand knot, then letting the working end pass in the following order through
  1. - the same eye to form a simple noose thus forming the loop
  2. - around the edge of the underhand knot, and through the loop of the noose
  3. - around and through the knot along with the main part ( thus passing simultaneously through all 3 of the original underhand knot, the noose and the last round of itself).
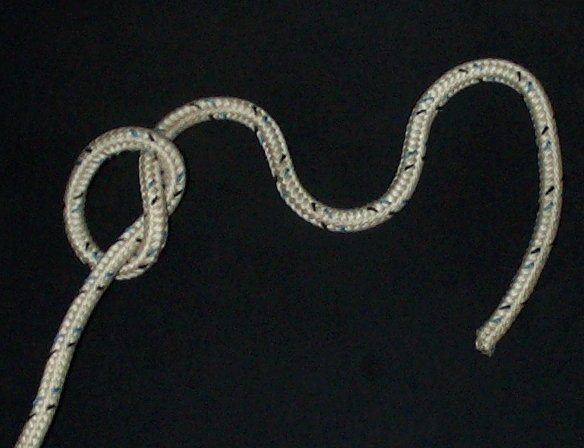
Tying a jamming false Zeppelin loop using the noose method: One starts with an underhand knot

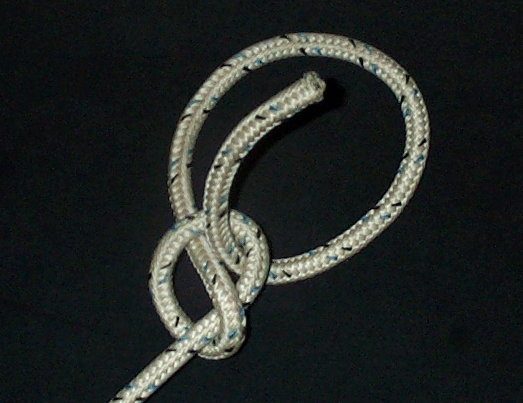
The working end is brought back in through the same eye to form a simple noose thus forming the loop

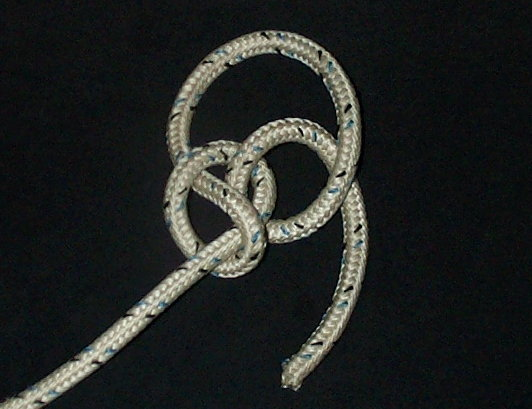
The working end is led around the edge of the underhand knot, and through the loop of the noose

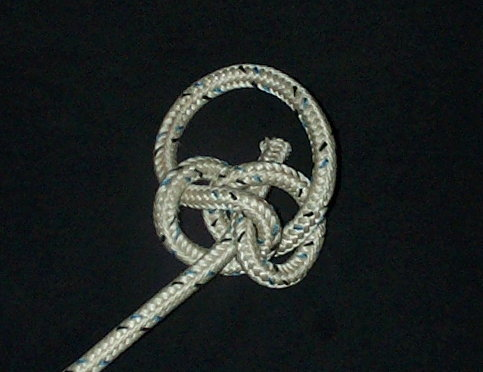
The working end is led around the knot to reenter and cross it alongside the main part ( thus passing through all 3 loops of underhand knot, noose and its own).

== See also ==
- List of knots
