= Top (tool) =

Tool used in the manufacture of laid rope

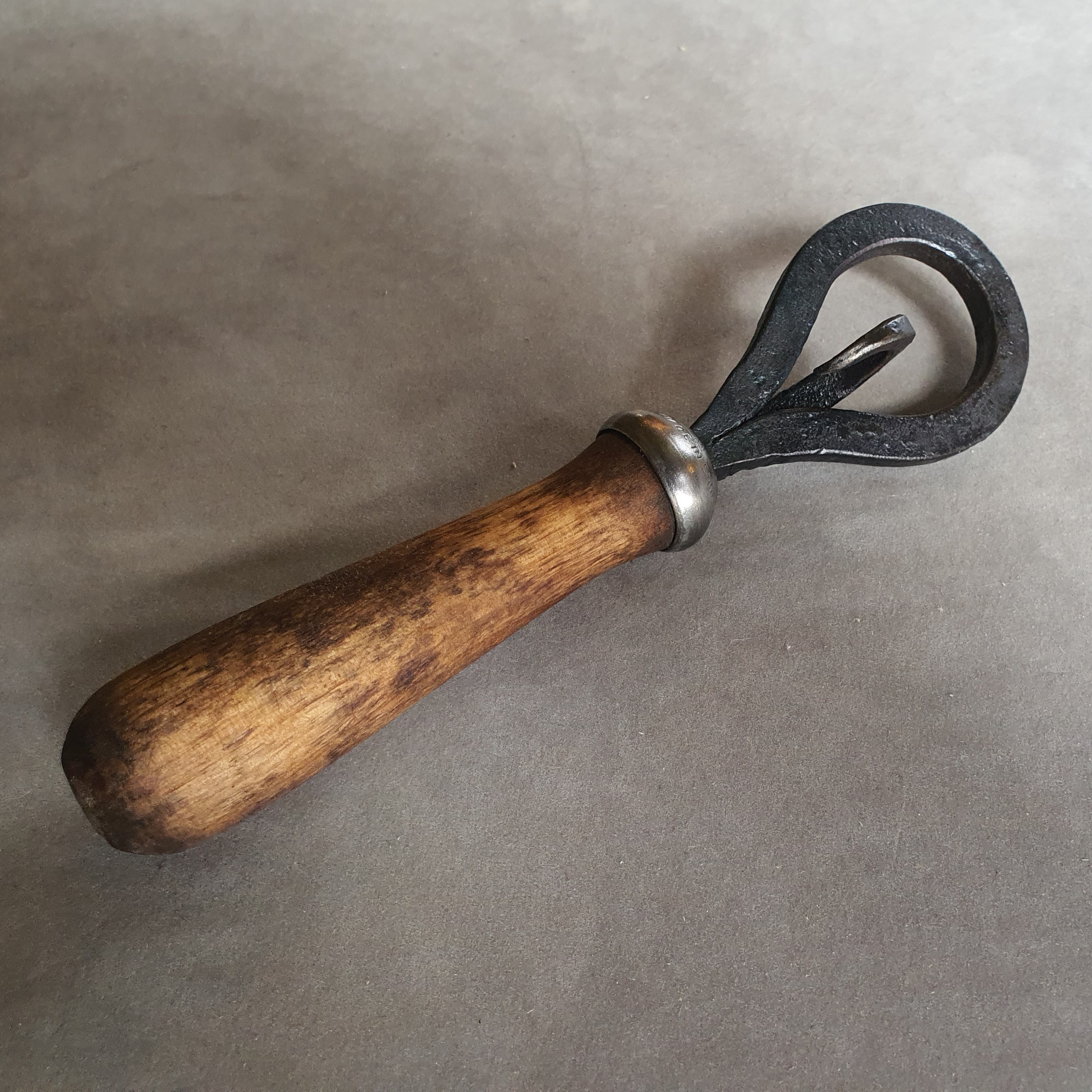
A typical Top used in rope making.

A top is a hand tool with an iron loop and hook used in the creation and splicing of rope. A Top is used to simultaneously hold a piece of rope while providing a hole to separate the "lays" (or strands) of synthetic or natural rope for splicing. A variation of a Top, the gripfid, is used for ply-split braiding. The gripfid has a jamming cleat to pull a cord back through the cord split by the fid's point. A variation of a Top can also be used as a rope wrench, rope separator or rope tool can be used in the manufacture of laid rope. The top is used to prevent the strands of a rope twisting together prematurely, which would lead to the rope being loose, allowing it to untwist. The amount of pressure applied to the top determines the stiffness of the final product; more pressure forces the strands together more tightly, making a rope that is harder to bend.

Tops come in a variety of forms for use on different types of rope. The simplest is a forked stick, used to create three strand rope, however more elaborate grooved bullet-shaped and cast iron types are available. Depending on the gauge of rope being made, the top can either be handheld or mounted on a trolley that moves along the ropewalk.

== Usage ==
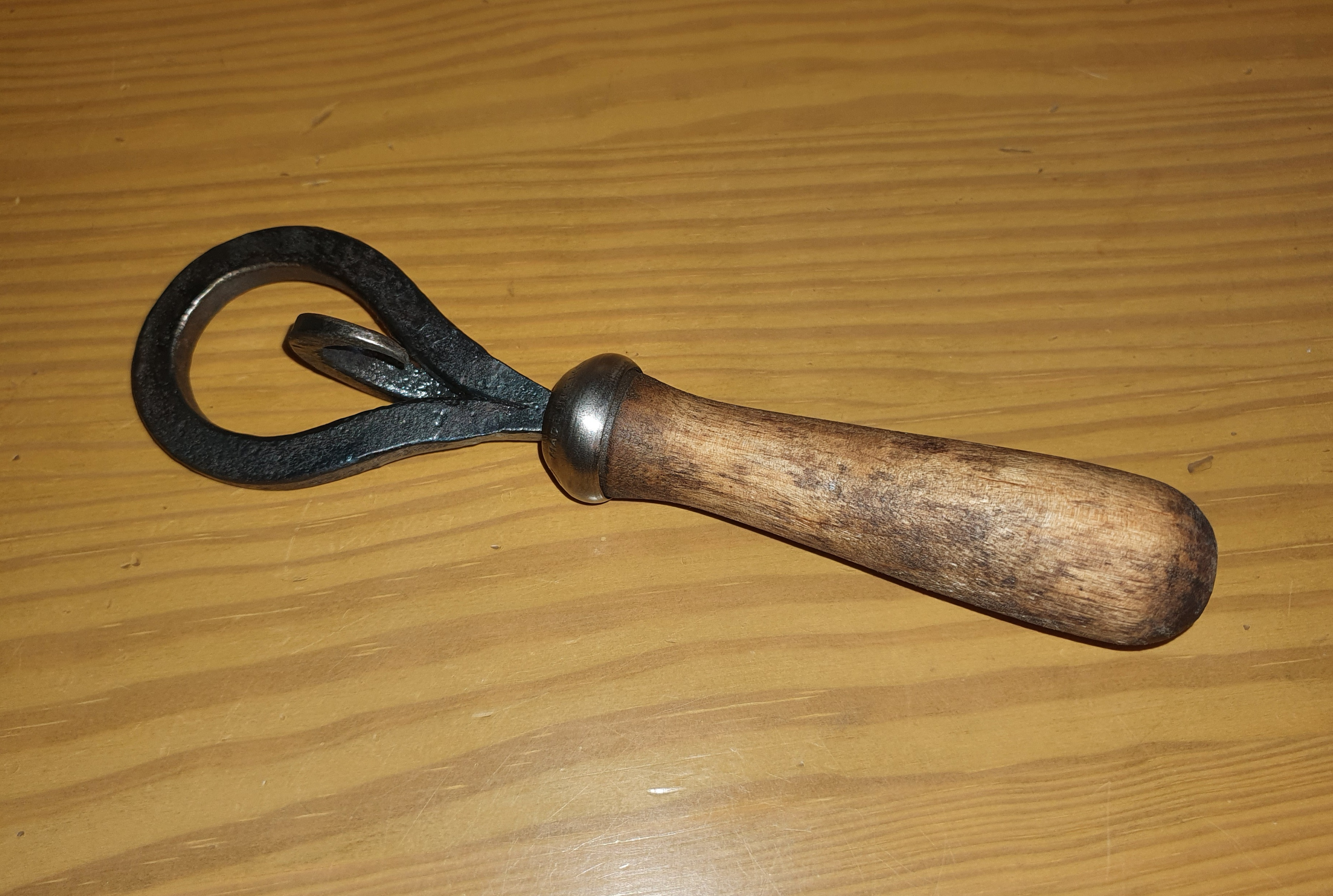

A rope is pushed into the curved hook to hold the rope securely. A Fid is then pushed through the loop to create an opening to prepare for splicing.

== History ==
Invented in 1822 in Dudley by Alexander Adams the Top was first used to braid and weave rope or twine together.

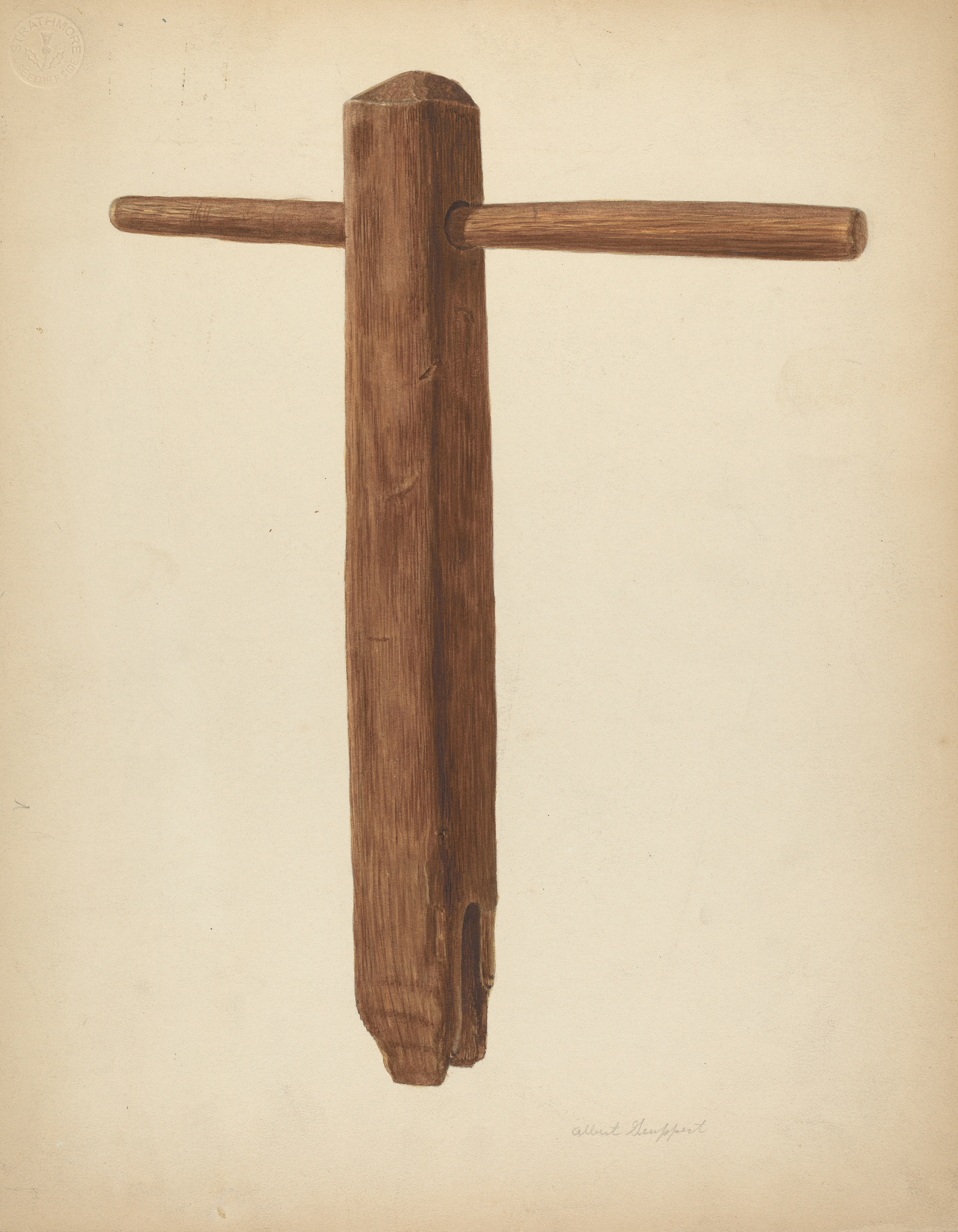
19th century first evolution of the tool.

By the 1900’s the tool was refined to aid specifically with splicing large ropes over 1 inch (25.4 mm) diameter – such as those used on ships.

== See also ==
- Marlinspike
