= Marlinspike (disambiguation) =

A marlinspike is a tool used for splicing and working with rope.

Marlinspike may also refer to:

- Terebra maculata, a snail known as the Marlinspike auger
- Marlinspike Hall, a château in Hergé's The Adventures of Tintin comics
- Moxie Marlinspike, a computer security expert
- Marlinespike hitch, a knot used to attach a line to a marlinspike
