= Marlinespike hitch =

Type of temporary knot

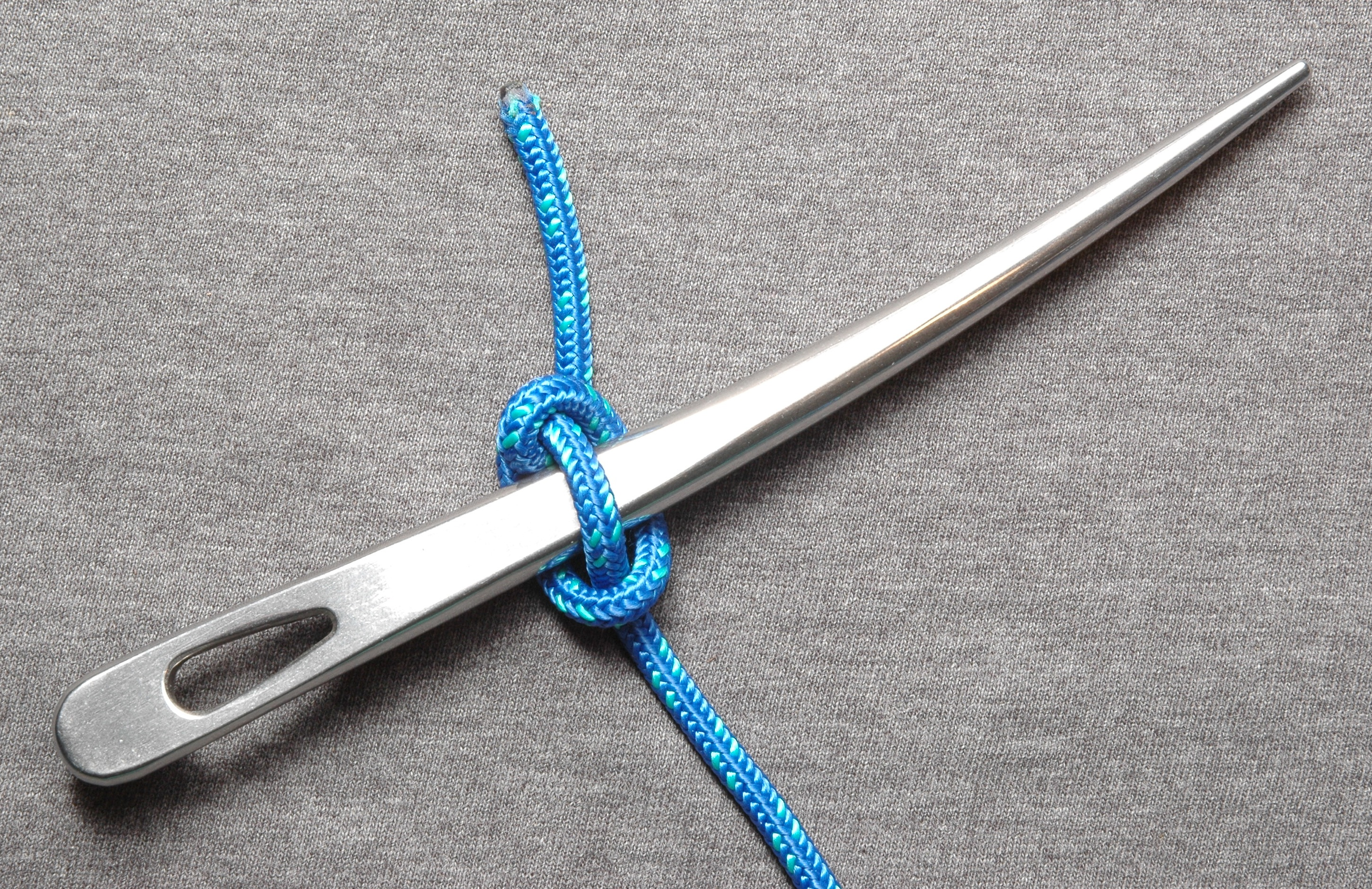
- Names: Marlinespike hitch, marlingspike hitch, boat knot
- Category: Hitch
- Related: Overhand slip knot, stein knot
- Releasing: Non-jamming
- Typical use: Pulling heavily on rope or twine, historically used by sailors
- Caveat: Intended as temporary hitch; not stable unless loaded
- ABoK: #559, #1186, #1789, #1880, #2030, #7, #43

The marlinespike hitch is a temporary knot used to attach a rod to a rope in order to form a handle. This allows more tension than could be produced comfortably by gripping the rope with the hands alone. It is useful when tightening knots and for other purposes in ropework.

As the name suggests, the type of rod traditionally used with this hitch is a marlinespike. The advantages of this hitch over others which might serve the purpose are its quickness of tying and ease of releasing. Topologically it is a form of the noose, but in practice this hitch is not allowed to collapse into that shape. When it does capsize into a traditional noose, it can jam against the rod, making it much more difficult to release.

The hitch is frequently used by hammock campers to attach adjustable rope slings ("whoopie slings") to the webbing straps that are used to attach hammocks to trees.

By passing the working end through the marlinespike hitch, this knot can be used as an alternative method of tying the Bowline knot. Passing through in the opposite direction will give you the Cowboy bowline (also known as the left-hand bowline, Dutch marine bowline or winter bowline).

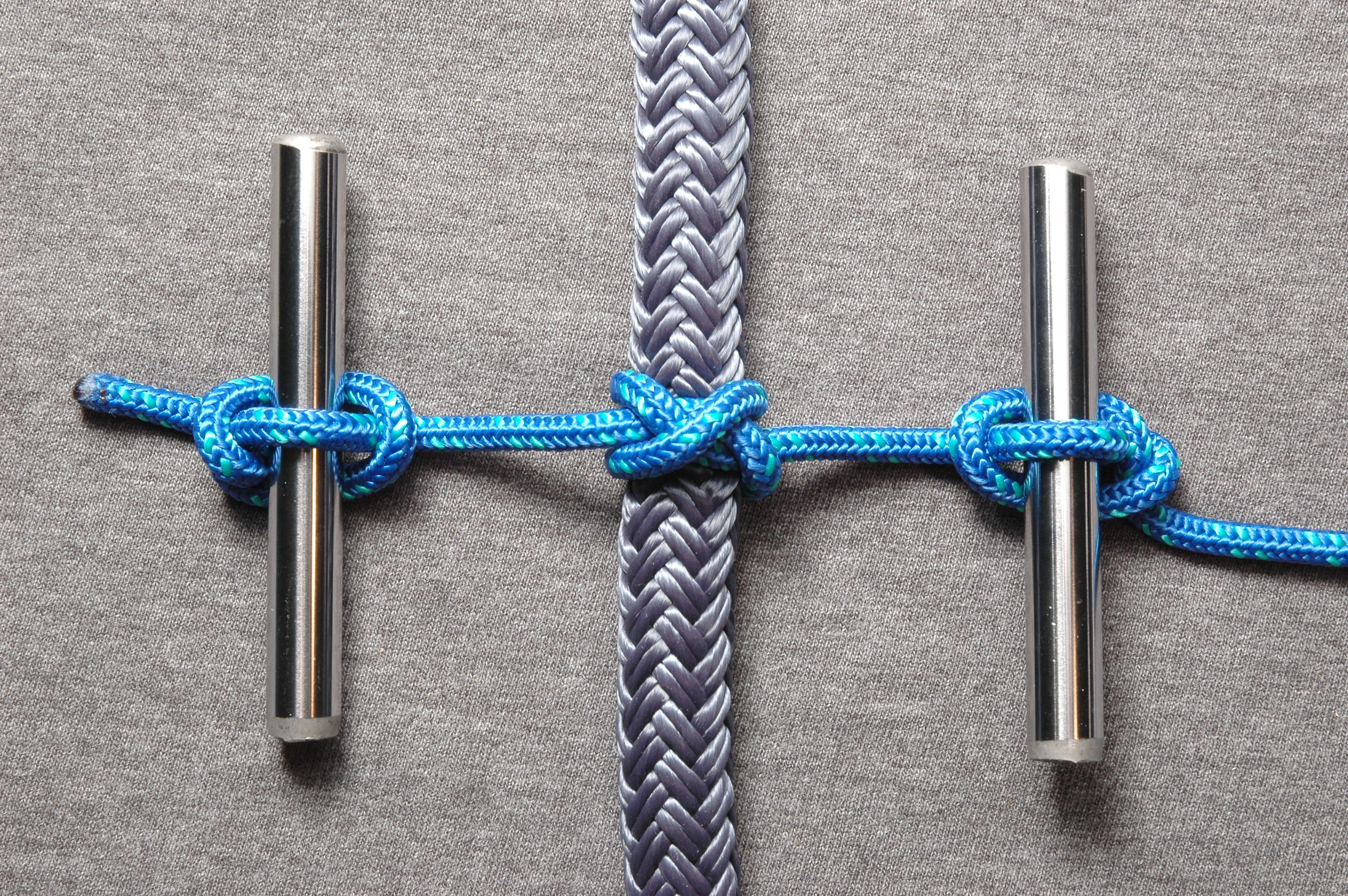
A constrictor knot prepared for tightening using two rods and marlinespike hitches

== Tying ==
Below is a basic method of tying. The knot can also be made by using the rod itself to form the loop, but the tying method does not affect the performance of the resulting hitch.

Begin with an overhand loop, that is, a loop in which the working part passes over the standing part:
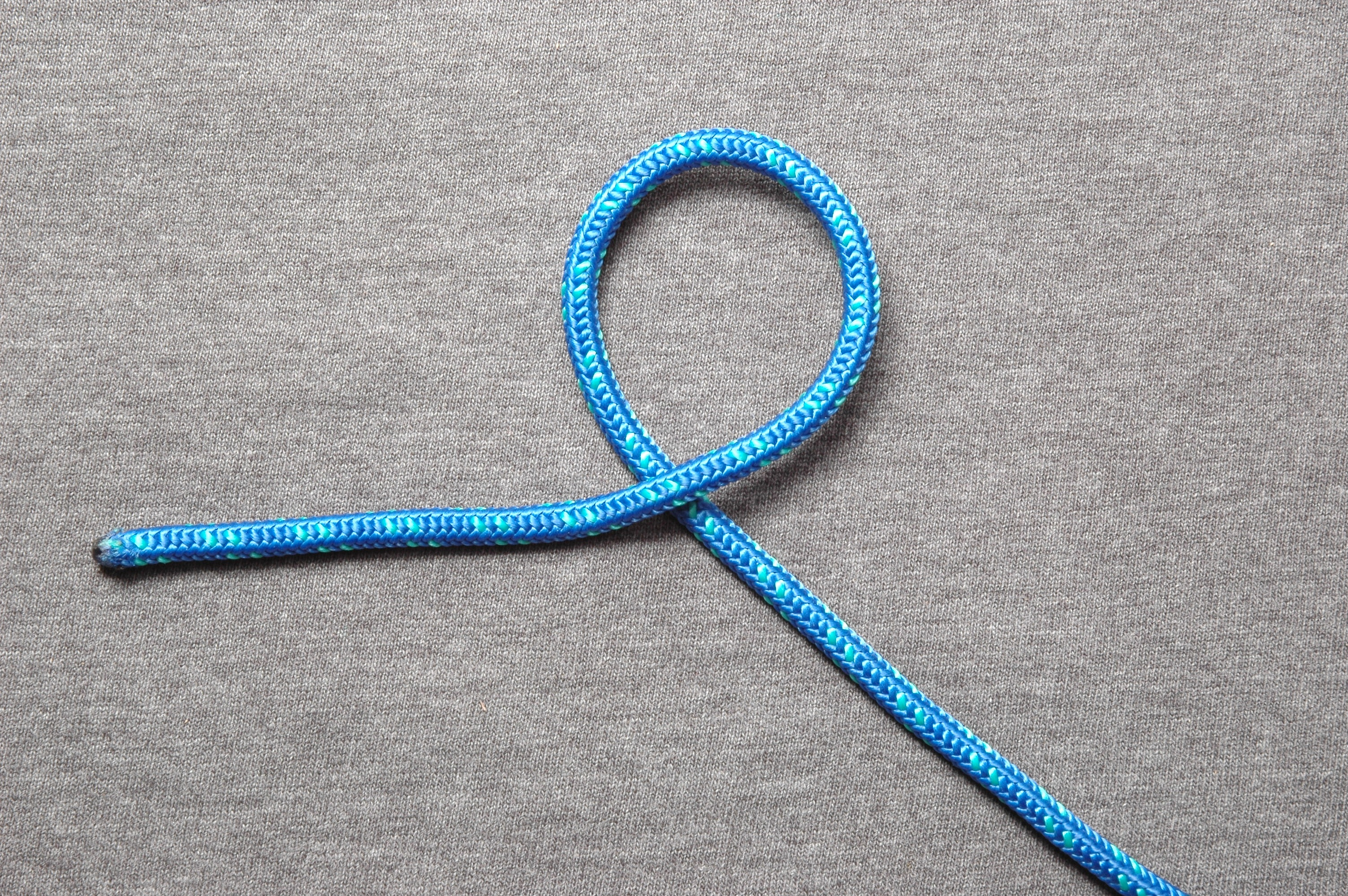

Fold the loop over the working part, towards the standing part such that the standing part is visible through the center of the loop:
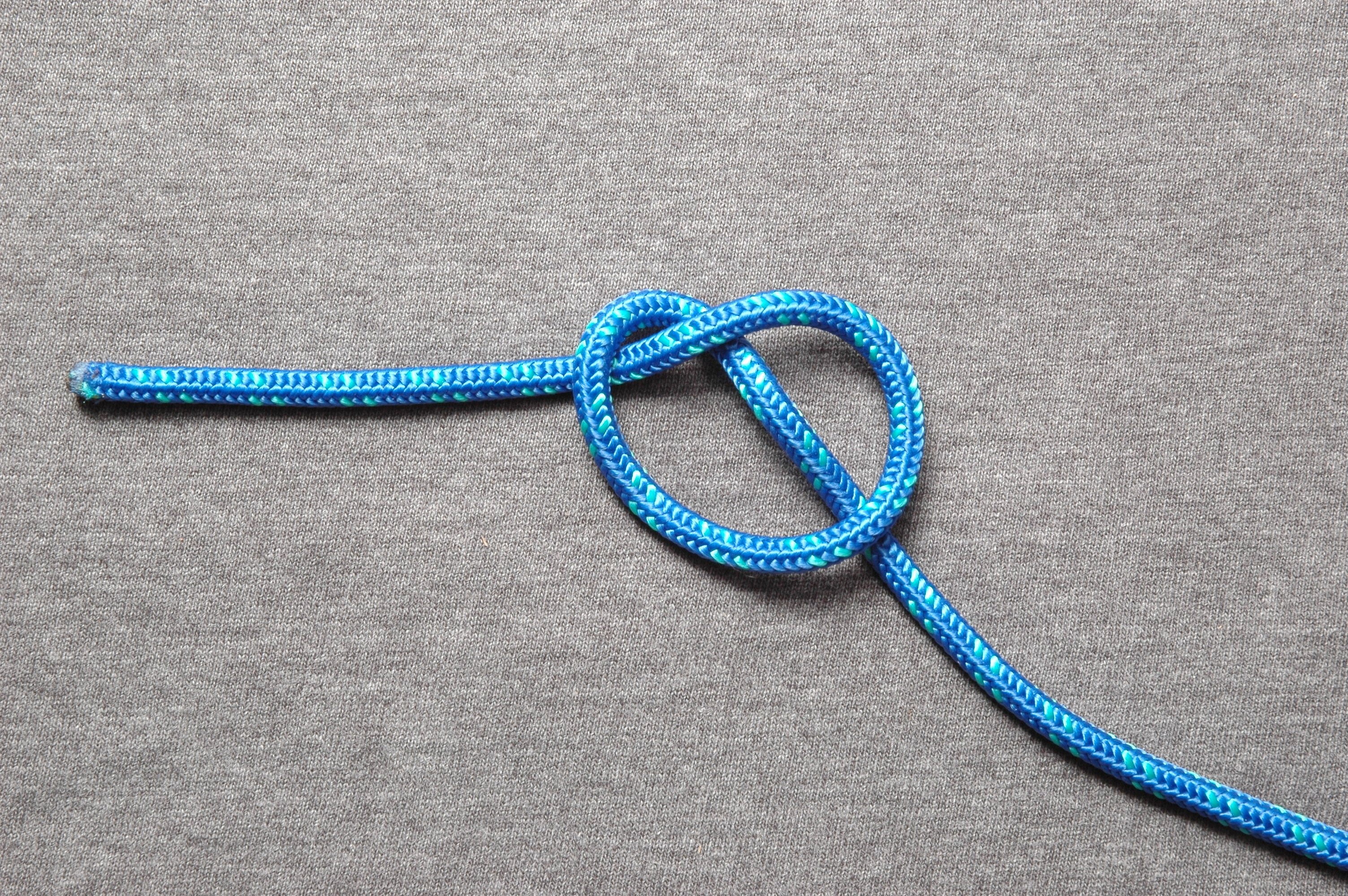
In stiffer material the first two steps can be accomplished in a single motion by twisting the working part with the fingers until a loop forms and flops over the standing part.

Use the rod to snag a bight of the standing part through the loop, that is, pass the rod over the near side of the loop, under the standing part and then over the far side of the loop:
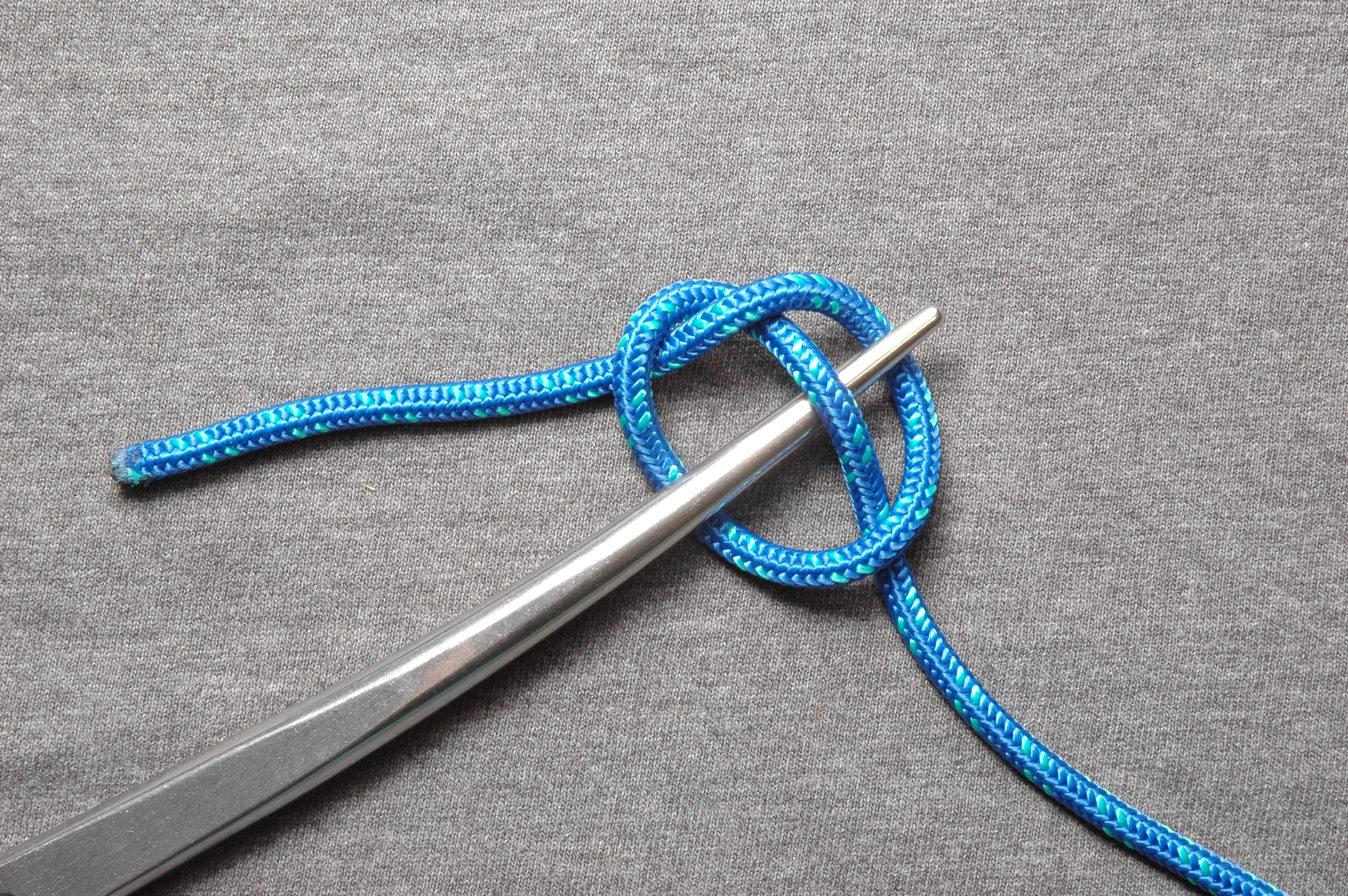

Before tensioning, excess slack can be removed by pulling simultaneously on both the working and standing parts:
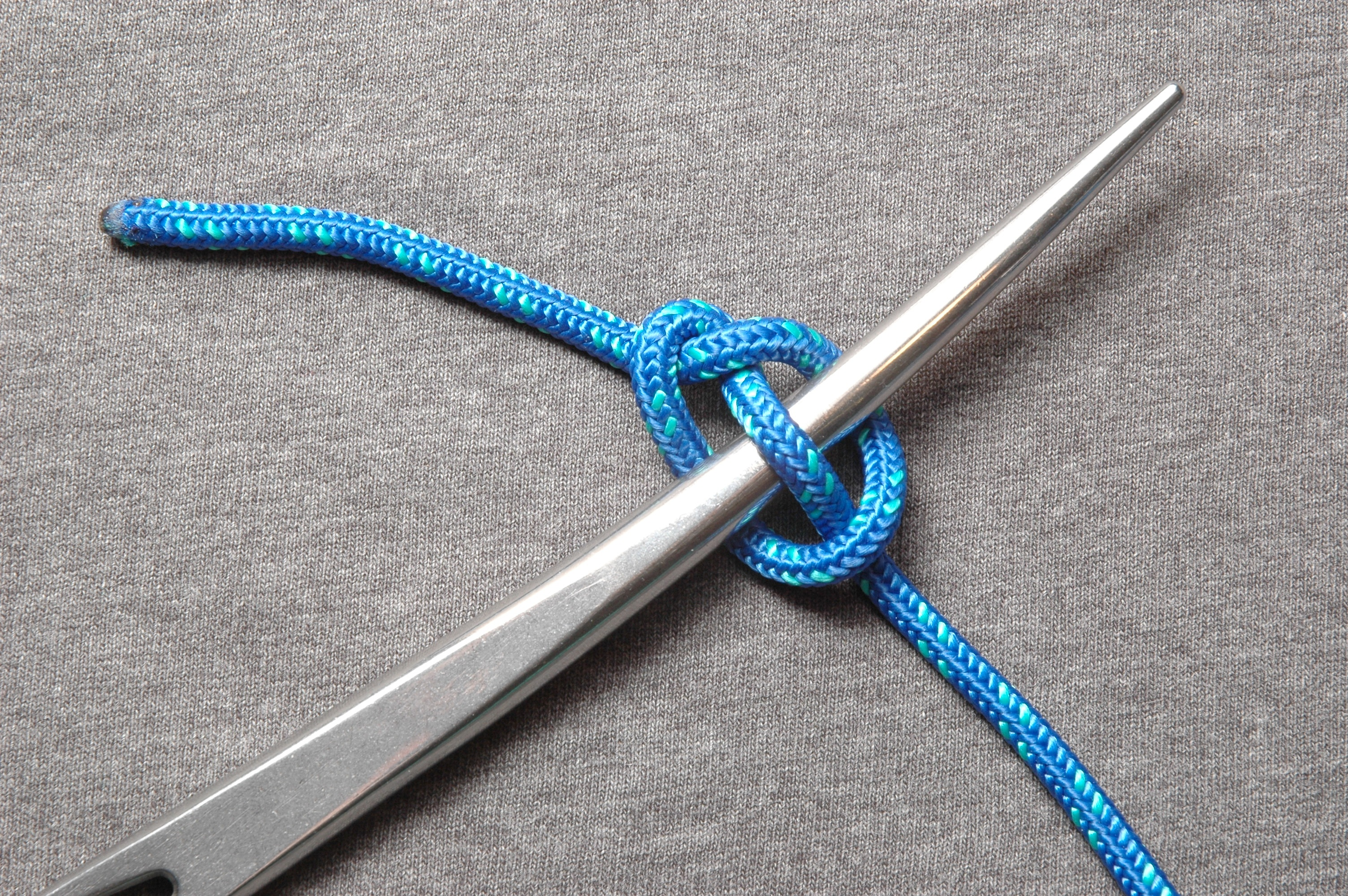
In actual use the hitch should be loaded only from the standing side.

=== Undesirable capsized form ===
If the working end is loaded rather than the standing part, the knot will capsize into an overhand noose:
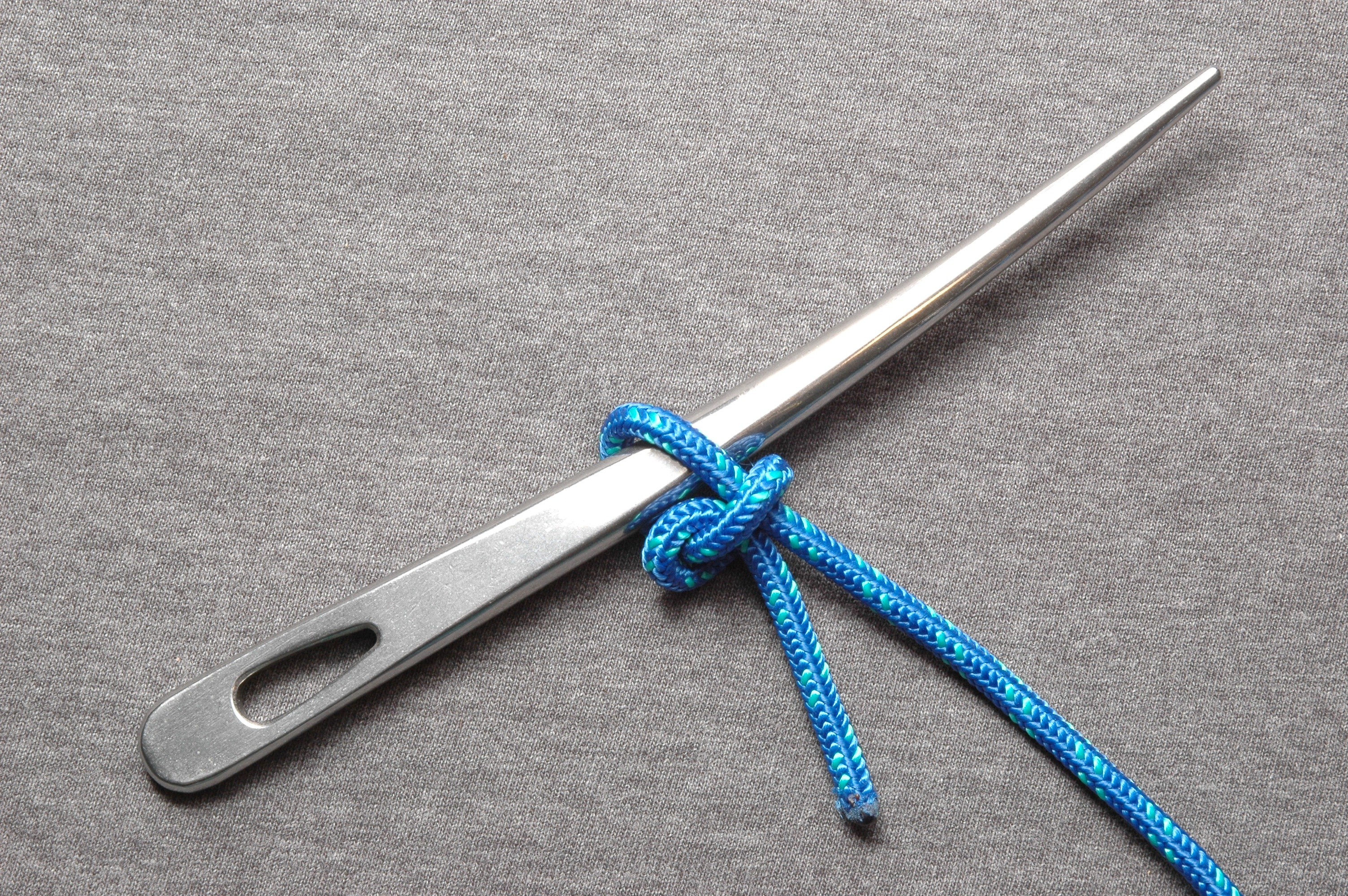
While this form may still hold when the standing part is subsequently loaded, it can jam badly against the rod. This is especially troublesome if the rod is not tapered.

== See also ==
- Marlinespike seamanship
