= Youpi =

Youpi may refer to:

- Youppi!, the official mascot of the Montreal Expos (1979–2004) and the Montreal Canadiens (2005–present)
- Youpi, a cartoon English Cocker Spaniel from Pierre Probst's Caroline series of children's books
- Youpi! L'école est finie, a children programming block on La Cinq
- Menthuthuyoupi, nicknamed "Youpi", a fictional character in the manga series Hunter × Hunter

== See also ==
- Whoopee (disambiguation)
- Yahoo (disambiguation)
