= Whoopee =

Whoopee or whoopie /ˈ(h)wʊpi/ may refer to:

- Whoopee /ˌ(h)wʊˈpiː/, an exclamation used as a form of cheering or to express jubilation
- Whoopee or whoopie, a euphemism for sexual intercourse
- Whoopee!, a 1928 musical comedy
  - Whoopee! (film), a 1930 adaptation of the musical
- Whoopee! (comics), a British comic book magazine of the 1970s and '80s
- Whoopee cap, a type of zigzagged felt cap
- Whoopee cushion, a joking device that mimics flatulence
- Whoopie pie, a kind of cookie sandwich
- Whoopie sling, a type of rope sling used in tree pruning and hammock suspension
  - Whoopie hook, a type of hook or fastener used in a whoopie sling

== See also ==
- Whoopee Camp, developers of the game Tomba!
- Whoopee Hill, a hill in Ohio County, Kentucky
- Whoopi (TV series), an American sitcom of the 2000s starring Whoopi Goldberg
