= Rigging knife =

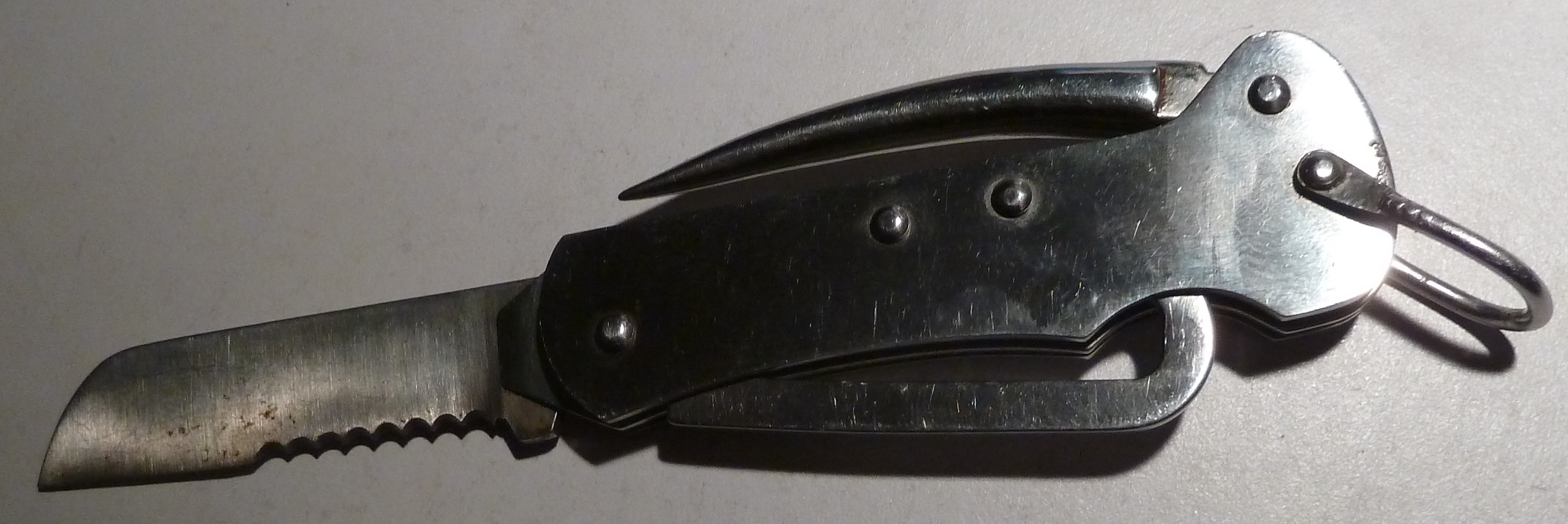
Combination rigging knife, marlin spike, and shackle key with serrated knife extended

A rigging knife is a specially designed knife used to cut rope. It may have a serrated edge for sawing through line, or a heavy blade suitable for hitting with a mallet to drive the knife through. Folding tools, often in combination with a marlinspike and shackle key, are convenient and portable. Rigger Brion Toss recommends fixed blade rigging knives for easy access in time sensitive situations and when working aloft. It can be a useful rescue tool if caught in rope and wire.

== See also ==
- Rigging
- Marlinspike
