= Gripfid =

The gripfid is an invention of knotting expert Stuart Grainger. It is a small knotter's fid with an added "grip", a hollow shaft that ends near the point with a vee that acts as a jamming cleat.

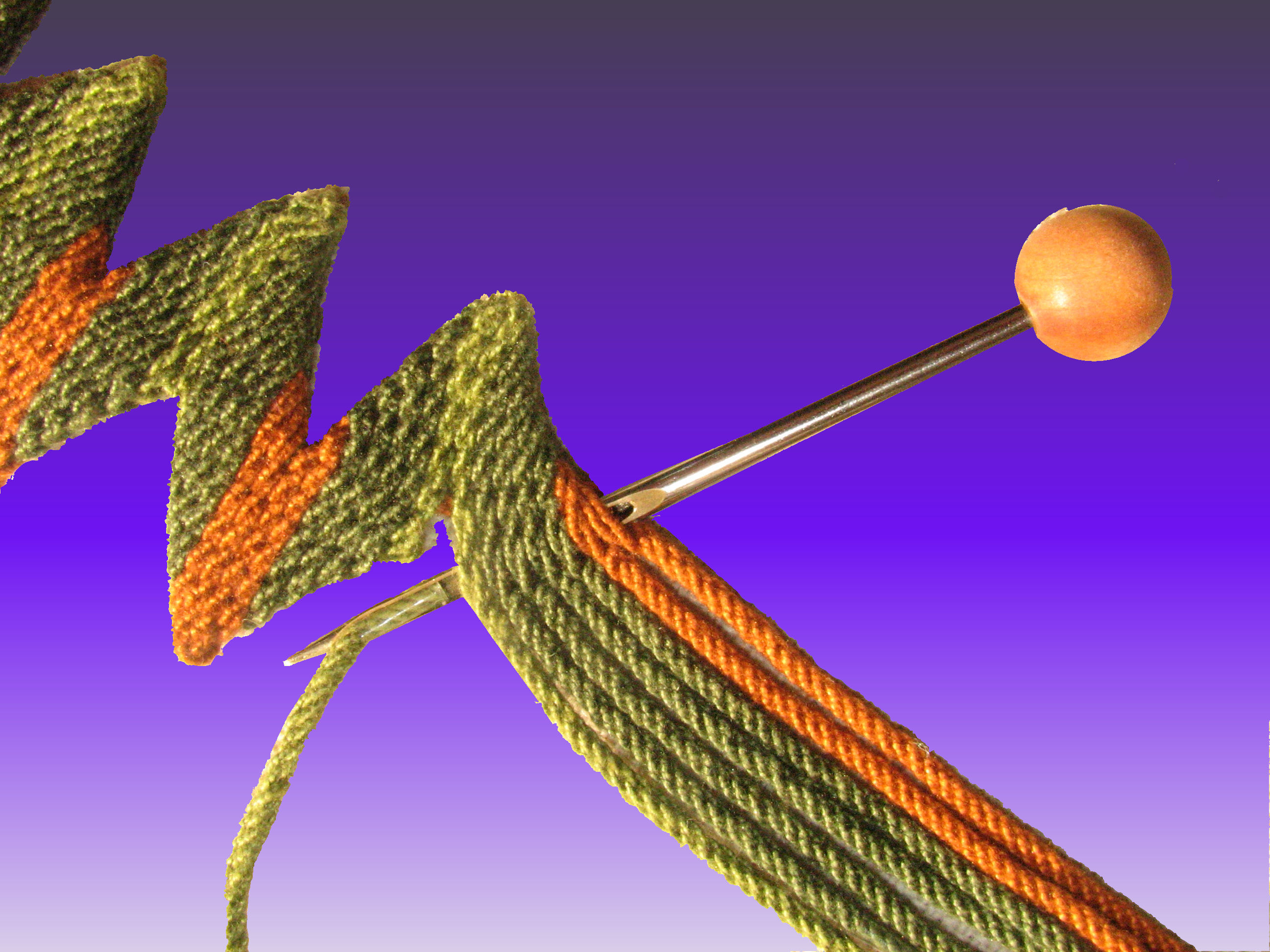
A Gripfid tool being used to pull a cord in ply-split braiding.

For ply-split braiding the point separates plies, and another cord is tucked into the hollow shaft of the gripfid and pulled back through the split cord. Although a latchhook may be used instead of a gripfid, the latter is much preferred.
