= Whoopee Hill =

Mountain in Kentucky, United States

- Location within Kentucky

Highest point
- Elevation: 597 ft (182 m)
- Coordinates: 37°30′14″N 086°54′05″W

Geography
- Location: Ohio County, Kentucky

Whoopee Hill is a summit in Ohio County, Kentucky, in the United States. With an elevation of 604 feet (184 m), Whoopee Hill is the 1037th tallest mountain in Kentucky.

Whoopee Hill has been noted for its unusual place name.
