= Ply-split braiding =

Braiding technique

Ply-split braiding is a technique where one twisted cord ("splitter") passes through another twisted cord or cords splitting the plies of the latter cords ("splittee" cords). This is unlike weaving or many forms of braiding where cloth is formed by threads interlacing in an over-under sequence. Pattern is formed by cord color, and splitting order.

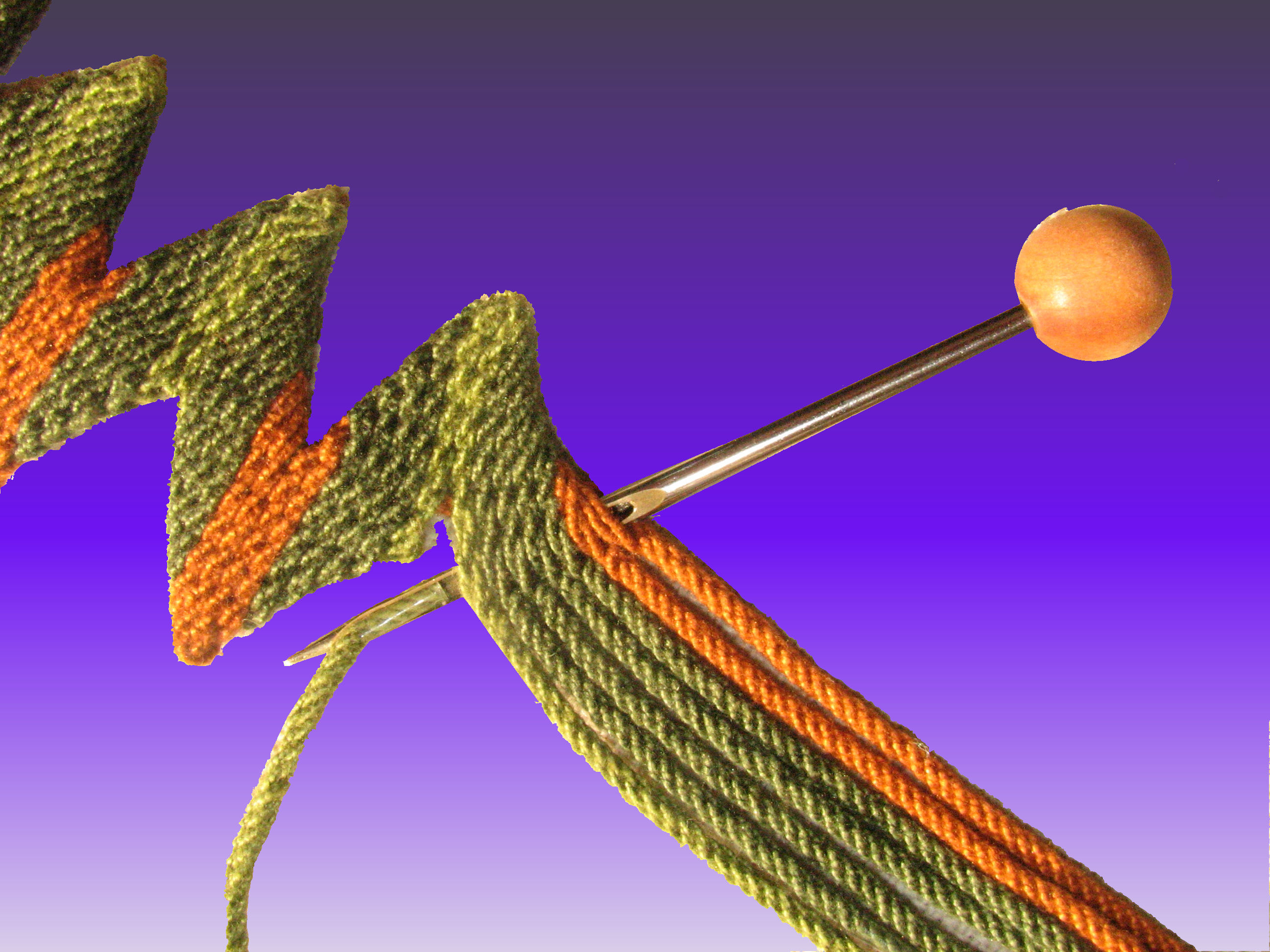
A cord being pulled through others in ply-split braiding.

== History ==
Ply-split braiding is an ancient art that is practiced for making elaborate camel girths and other animal regalia of hand-spun goat hair, wool or sometimes cotton in northwestern India.

The first written description of the technique appeared in 1976 with Virginia Harvey's "Split-Ply Twining". In the introduction, she describes seeing two camel girths at Convergence 1974, and says that Peter Collingwood "suspected the pieces were produced by pulling one yarn through the ply of another". The ply-split girths examined for this publication were created with only one technique, now known as single course oblique twining (SCOT).

In 1974 and 1975, two graduate students from UCLA conducted field research in Rajasthan and Gujarat in north-western India. They were introduced to Ishwar Singh, a master girth maker, who spent several weeks with them demonstrating the construction of the girths. Their 1982 publication, "The Ply-Split Camel Girths of West India" was the first to document the entire traditional process, including spinning, plying, cordmaking, and three structures of ply-splitting. These are SCOT, mentioned above, as well as plain oblique twining (POT) and two-layered oblique interlacing (TLOI).

The designs showed prominence in the market and were even used to decorate camels for wedding processions.

== Modern usage ==
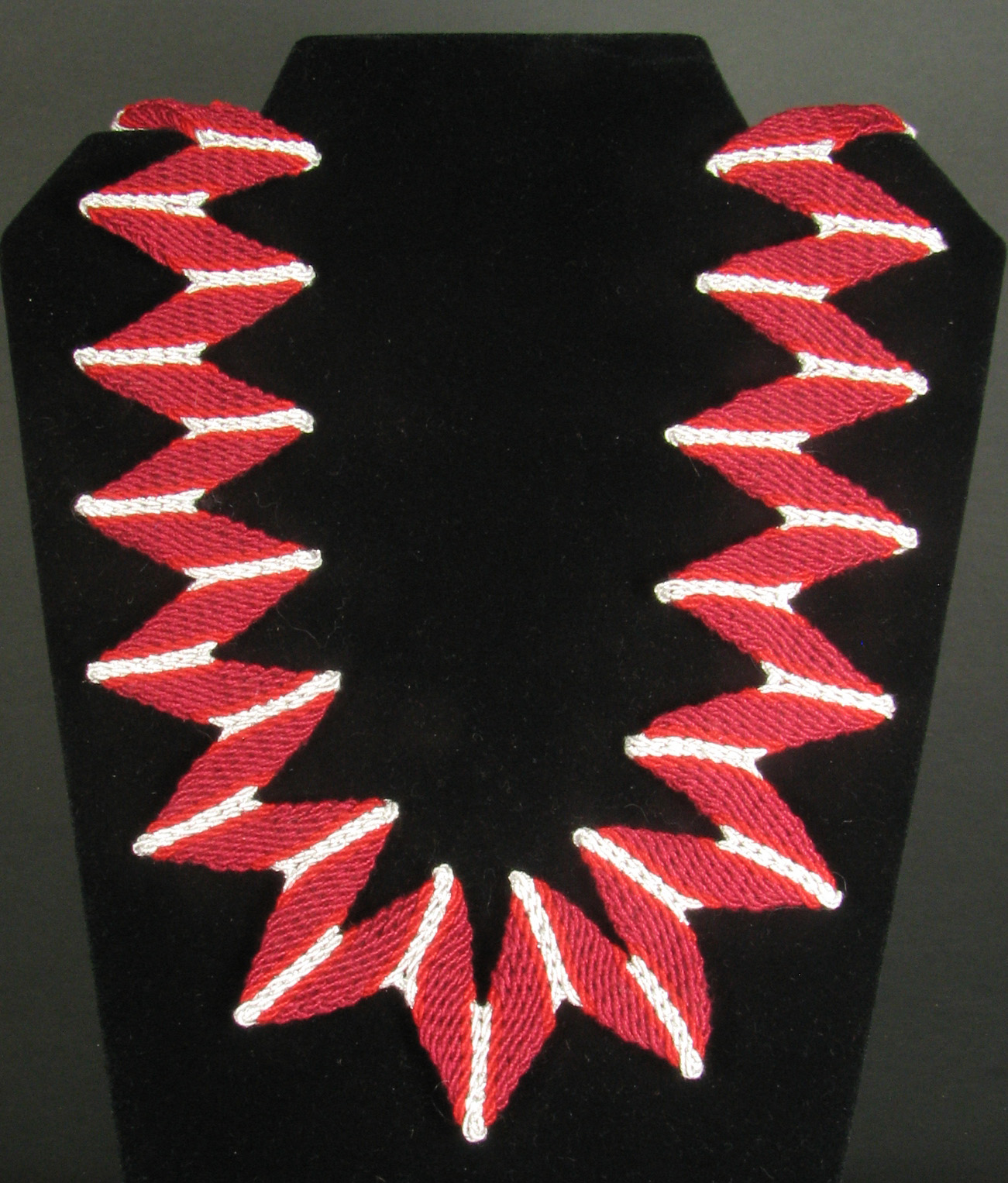
A braided necklace made from cotton cords by ply-split braiding

Today, the ply-split braiding technique is used by fiber artists to create handmade decorative items including neckwear, bags, household décor, garments and three-dimensional structures such as baskets and sculptures.

Contemporary braid makers use a variety of yarns such as cotton, linen, hemp, silk, paper, or rayon. The ply-splitting process requires minimal equipment: A four-hook cord maker to make the cords, and a gripfid for splitting the plies of one or more cords and drawing a cord back through the split cords.

== Resources ==
The premier reference is Peter Collingwood's The Techniques of Ply-split Braiding. which presents a comprehensive view of the history and techniques. A more easily accessible history is found in David Fraser's paper "View From The Shoulders Of Thar Masters: New Space For Ply-Split Braiding". Other publications include Julie Hedges, Ply-split Braiding, An Introduction and Ply-split Braiding, Further Techniques. Linda Hendrickson's work includes "Great SCOT! A Beginner's Guide to Ply-Split Braids in Single-Course Oblique Twining", "How to Make Ply-Split Baskets", "How to Make Ply-Split Braids & Bands", and several instructional videos on YouTube. There have been many publications in weaving journals.
