= Whoopie sling =

Rope sling designed for tree pruning or tree removal

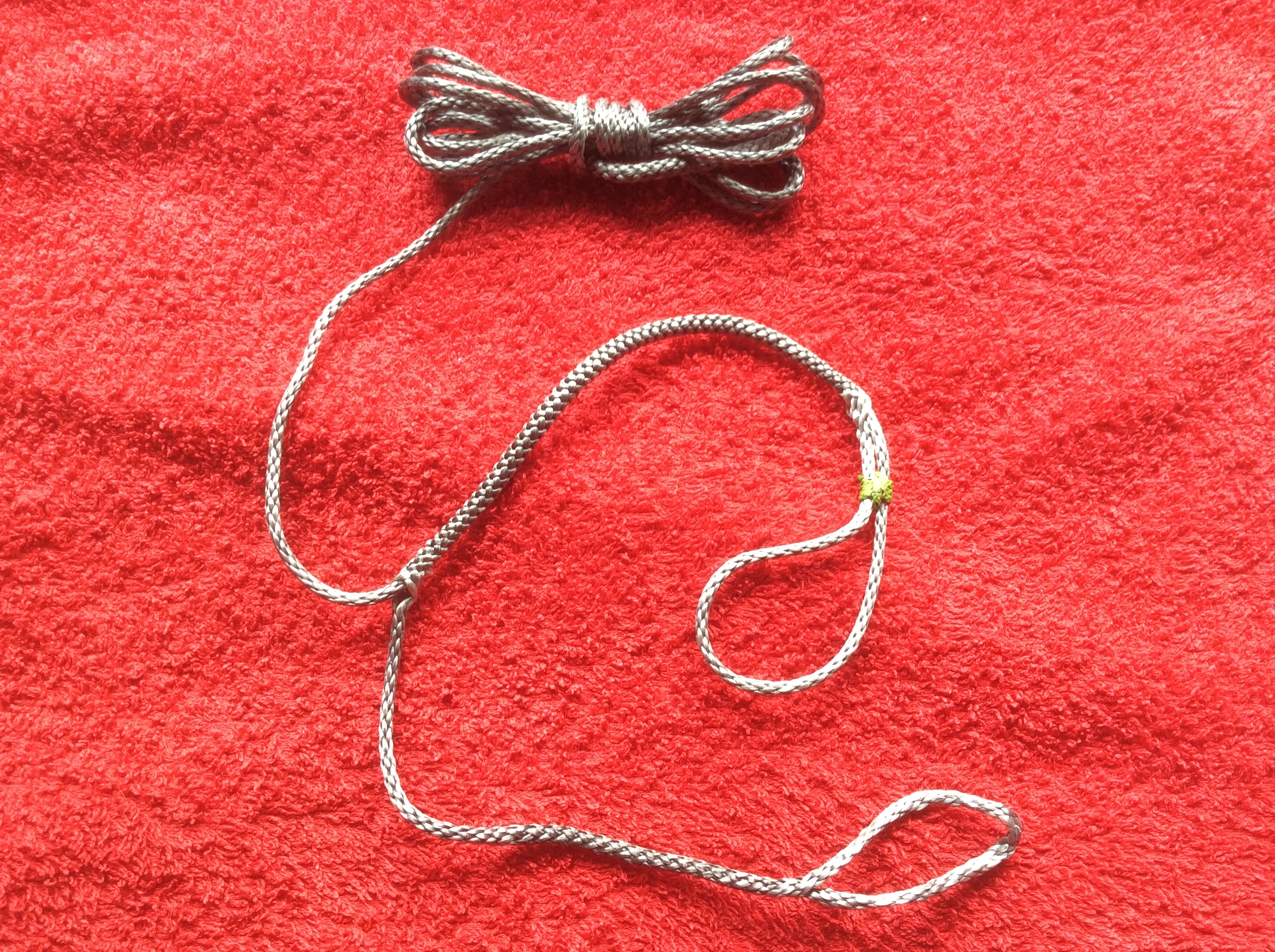
A whoopie sling for hammock camping

A whoopie sling is an easily adjustable rope sling designed for tree pruning or tree removal. The whoopie sling works by wrapping the sling around the trunk of a tree or a heavy load bearing limb and pulling the end of the rope within the sling through a spliced choker. By adjusting the size of the eye in the rope through the choker the user is able to adjust the length of the sling constricting around the tree without needing knots.

Whoopie slings made with ultra-high-molecular-weight polyethylene (UHMWPE) have a very high strength to weight ratio, making them an increasingly popular tool for outdoor recreation where an easily adjustable yet strong line is needed. These slings usually have a smaller diameter and are often used while suspending hammocks during hiking, camping, or sailing.
