= Marlinspike =

Tool used in marine ropework

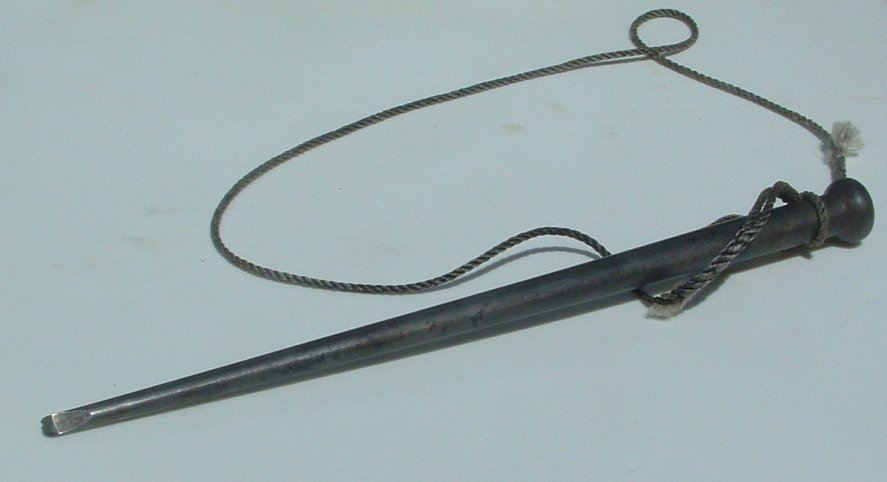
A typical marlinspike with lanyard

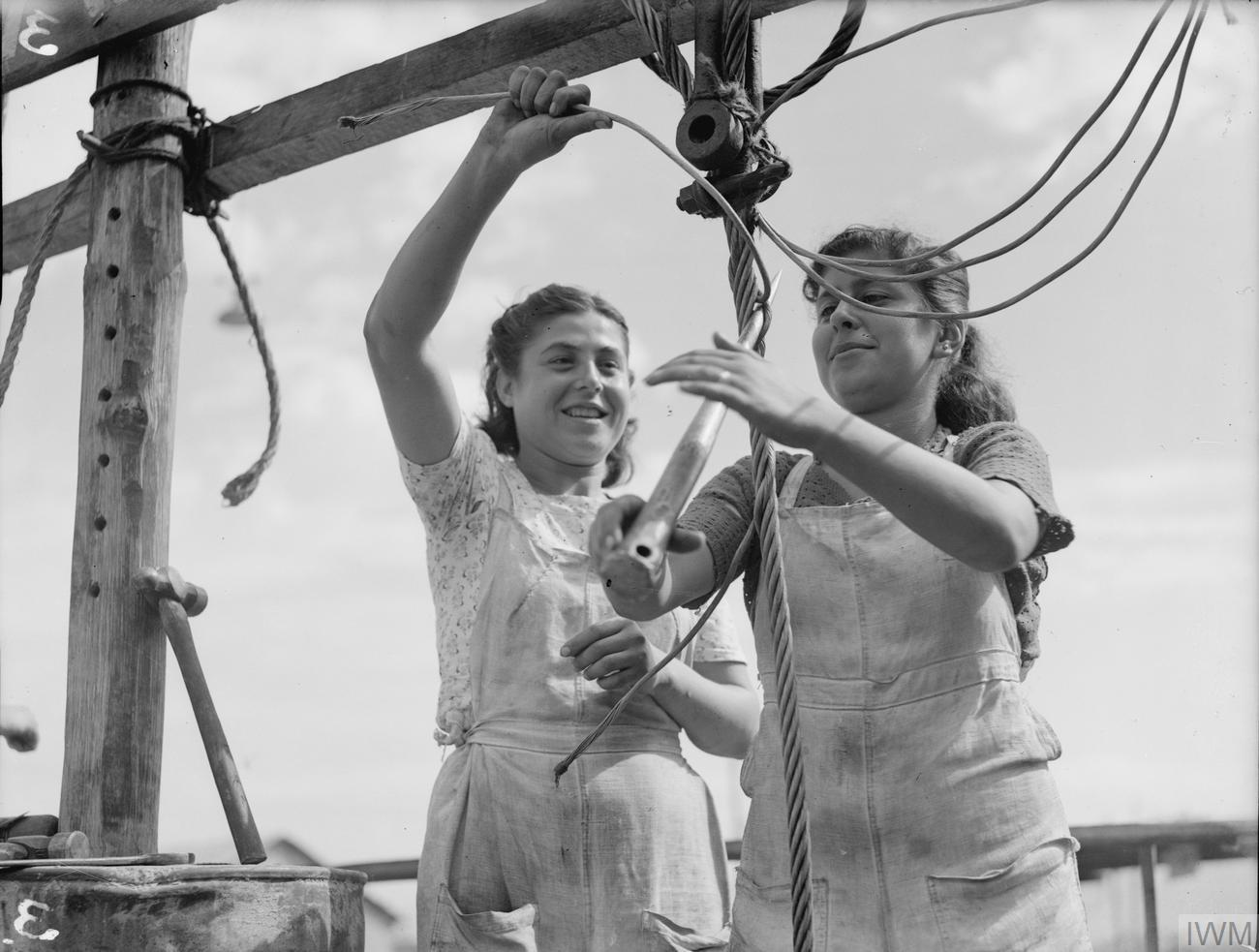
A large marlinspike being used to splice a heavy wire cable

A marlinspike (/ˈmɑːrlɪnspaɪk/, sometimes spelled marlin spike, marlinespike, or [archaic] marlingspike) is a tool used in marine ropework. Shaped in the form of a narrow metal cone tapered to a rounded or flattened point, it is used in tasks such as unlaying rope for splicing, untying knots, drawing tight using a marlinspike hitch, and as a toggle joining ropes under tension in a belaying pin splice.

Marlinspikes are usually about 6–12 inches (15–30 cm) long but may reach 2 feet (61 cm) or more when used for working heavy cables and ropes. They are usually made from iron or steel, whereas fids, similar in shape and function, are formed from wood or bone. Historically a separate tool, the marlinspike is integrated in specialized versions of folding rigging knives and pocket knives.

Sailors who become proficient at knot tying, splicing, and sewing using the marlinspike are said to have mastered marlinespike seamanship, earning them the right to be known as marlin spikes or marlinspike seamen.

== Uses ==
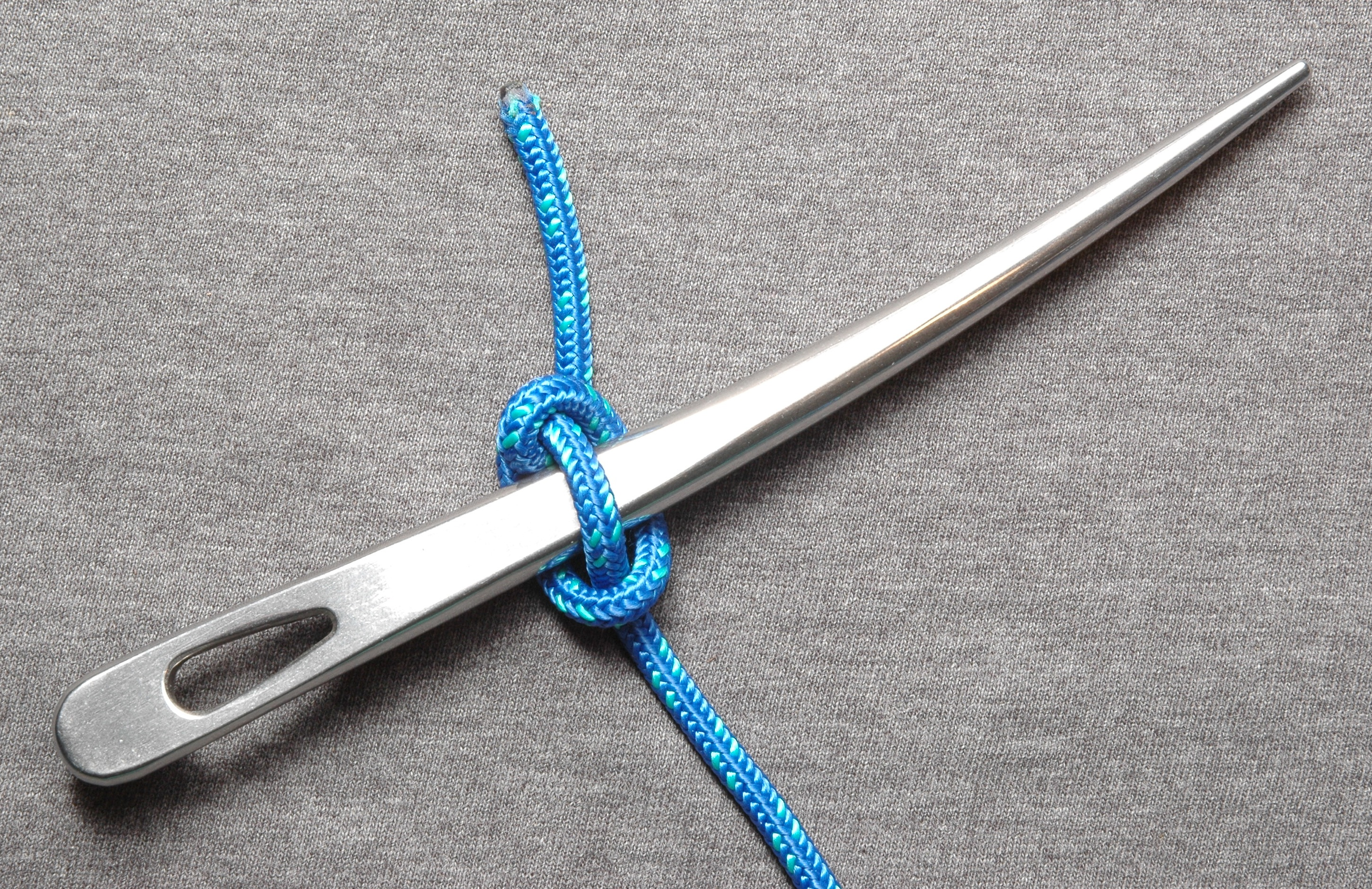
Marlinspike with integral shackle key, shown with a marlinspike hitch

Marlinspikes are used as a lever to:

- open strands of laid rope when forming eyes or inserting items into the lay.
- untie knots that have tightened under tension.
- tension marline or rope using a marlinspike hitch, much tighter than by gripping the line with the hand alone.

== Etymology ==
Marlinspike derives from the practice of "marling", winding small diameter twine called marline around larger ropes to form protective whippings. The long-billed fish marlin is thought to be named after the marlinspike.

Marlin spike gets its name from the small cord called marlin, which is typically tarred and used for the serving of rope. The fish marlin gets its name from marlin spike.

== See also ==
- Marlinspike Hall
