= Ropework =

Skills for use and maintenance of rope

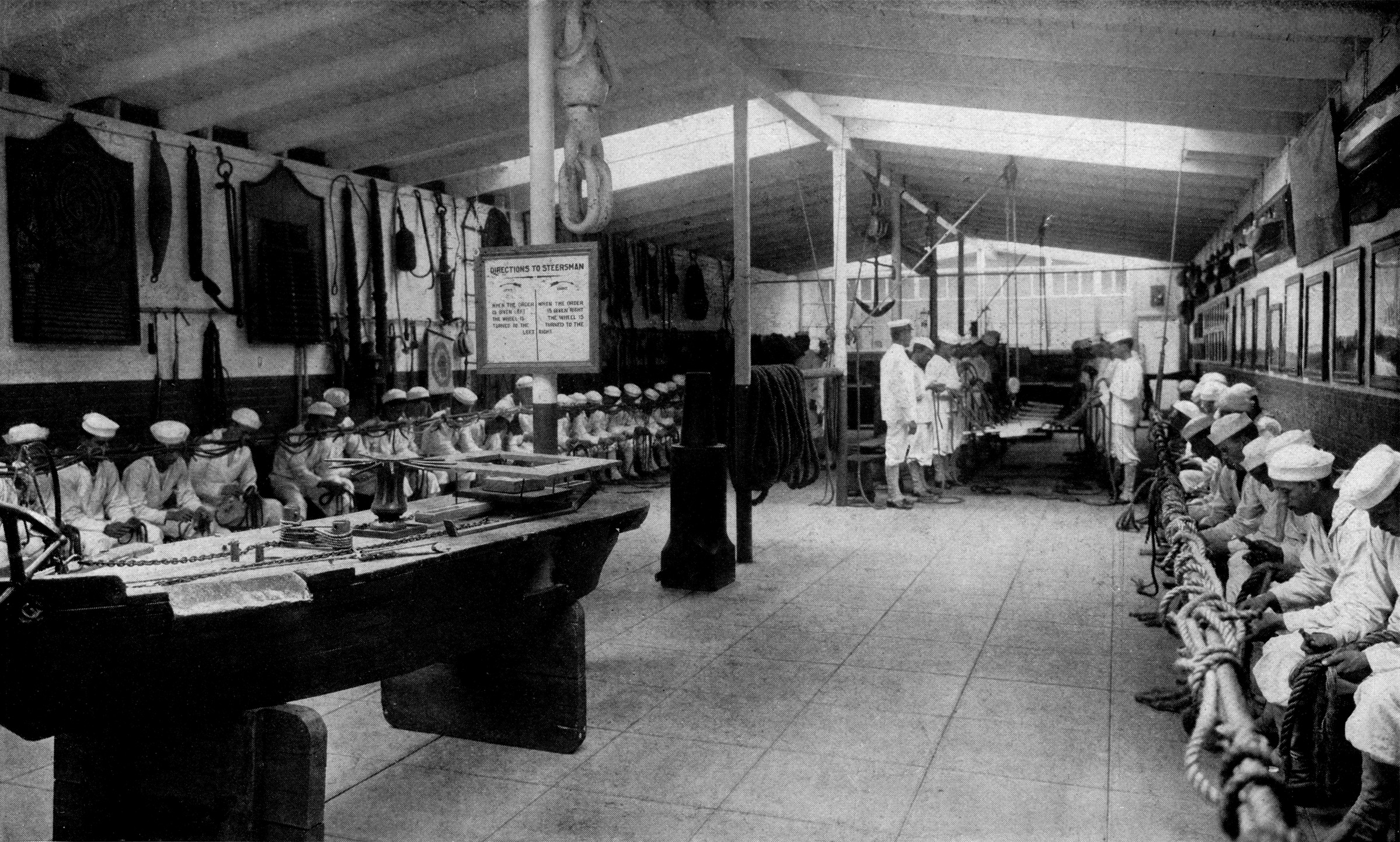
Marlinespike seamanship being taught to sailors in the early 20th century

Ropework or marlinespike seamanship are umbrella terms for a skillset spanning the use, maintenance, and repair of rope. Ropework is used by seafarers, climbers, ironworkers, and military personnel.

Included are tying knots, splicing, making lashings, whippings, and proper use and storage of rope.

While the skill of a sailor in the Age of Sail was often judged by how well he knew marlinespike seamanship, the knowledge it embraces involving docking a craft, towing, making repairs underway, and more is still critical for modern seafarers.

== Whippings ==
A whipping knot is a means of holding the cut end of a rope together to prevent fraying and ensure ease of use. The simplest form is the common whipping. Constrictor knots can serve as temporary whippings while cutting ropes, as can a few layers of adhesive tape.

Other fray-prevention techniques include back-splicing, aglets, or the application of a rubberized adhesive coating, resin, or paint to the cut end. Some modern synthetic fibers, such as nylon and polyester can make use of alternative methods such as fusion, which uses heat to melt the fibers to make a clean cut and permanent end; this technique cannot be used with non-melting fibers such as aramids.

However, the rope and knotting expert Geoffrey Budworth warns against the practice of fusing thus:

Sealing rope ends this way is lazy and dangerous. A tugboat operator once sliced the palm of his hand open down to the sinews after the hardened (and obviously sharp) end of a rope that had been heat-sealed pulled through his grasp. There is no substitute for a properly made whipping.

== See also ==
- List of knots
- List of knot terminology
- Marlinspike – Tool used in marine ropework
- Rope splicing – Semi-permanent joint between two ropes
