= Aftermath of the 2011 Tōhoku earthquake and tsunami =

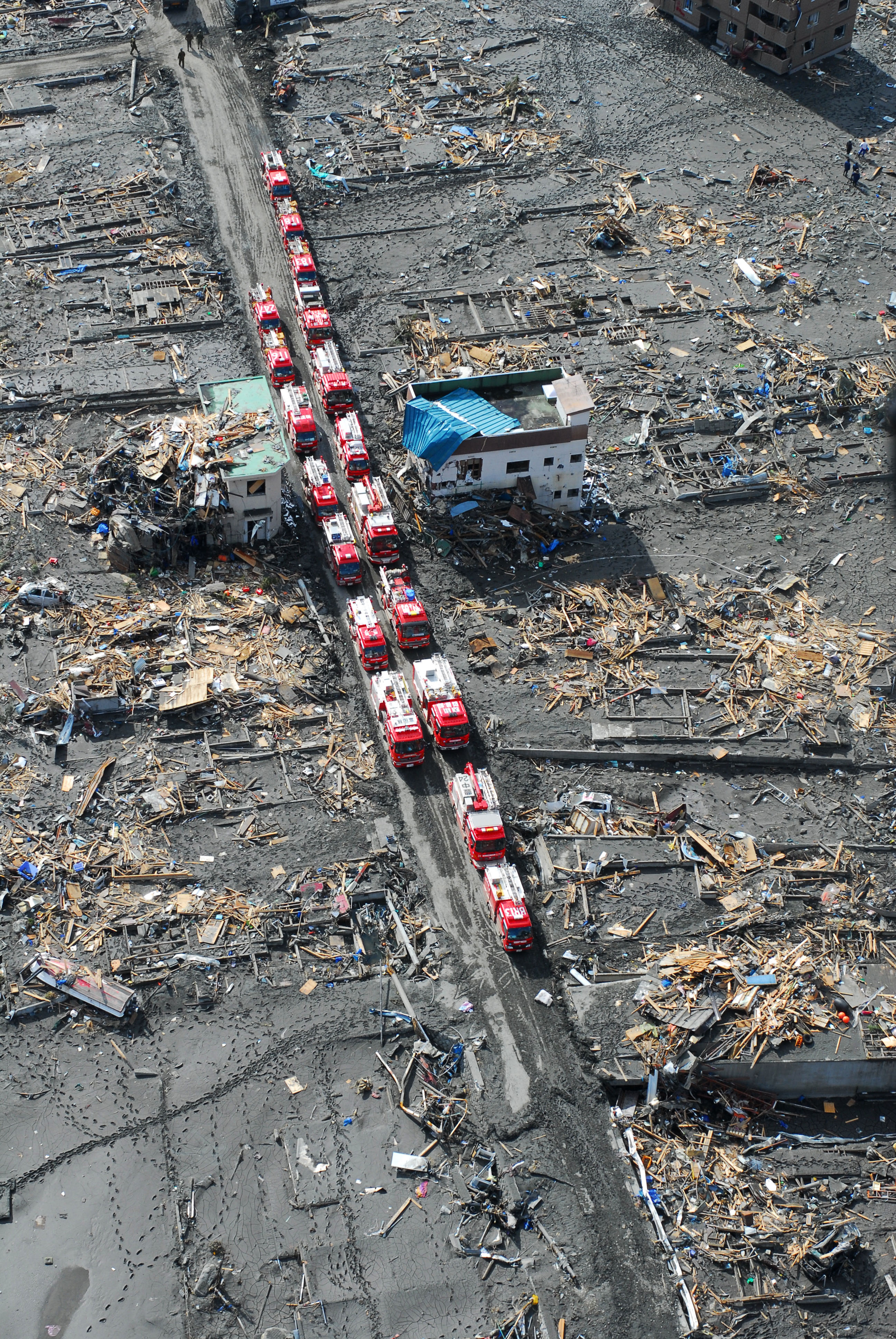
A convoy of fire engines from Osaka in the tsunami zone

The aftermath of the 2011 Tōhoku earthquake and tsunami included both a humanitarian crisis and massive economic impacts. The tsunami created over 300,000 refugees in the Tōhoku region of Japan, and resulted in shortages of food, water, shelter, medicine and fuel for survivors. 15,900 deaths have been confirmed. 2,500 people remain missing. In response to the crisis, the Japanese government mobilized the Self-Defence Forces, while many countries sent search and rescue teams to help search for survivors. Aid organizations both in Japan and worldwide also responded, with the Japanese Red Cross reporting $1 billion in donations. The economic impact included both immediate problems, with industrial production suspended in many factories, and the longer-term issue of the cost of rebuilding which has been estimated at ¥10 trillion (US$122 billion).

As of 2021, rebuilding and reconstruction efforts has cost Japan $300 billion in US currency.

A further serious impact of the tsunami was the critical damage done to the Fukushima Daiichi Nuclear Power Plant, resulting in severe releases of radioactivity and the prospect of a long-term health and environmental hazard in need of an expensive clean-up.

== Humanitarian crisis ==
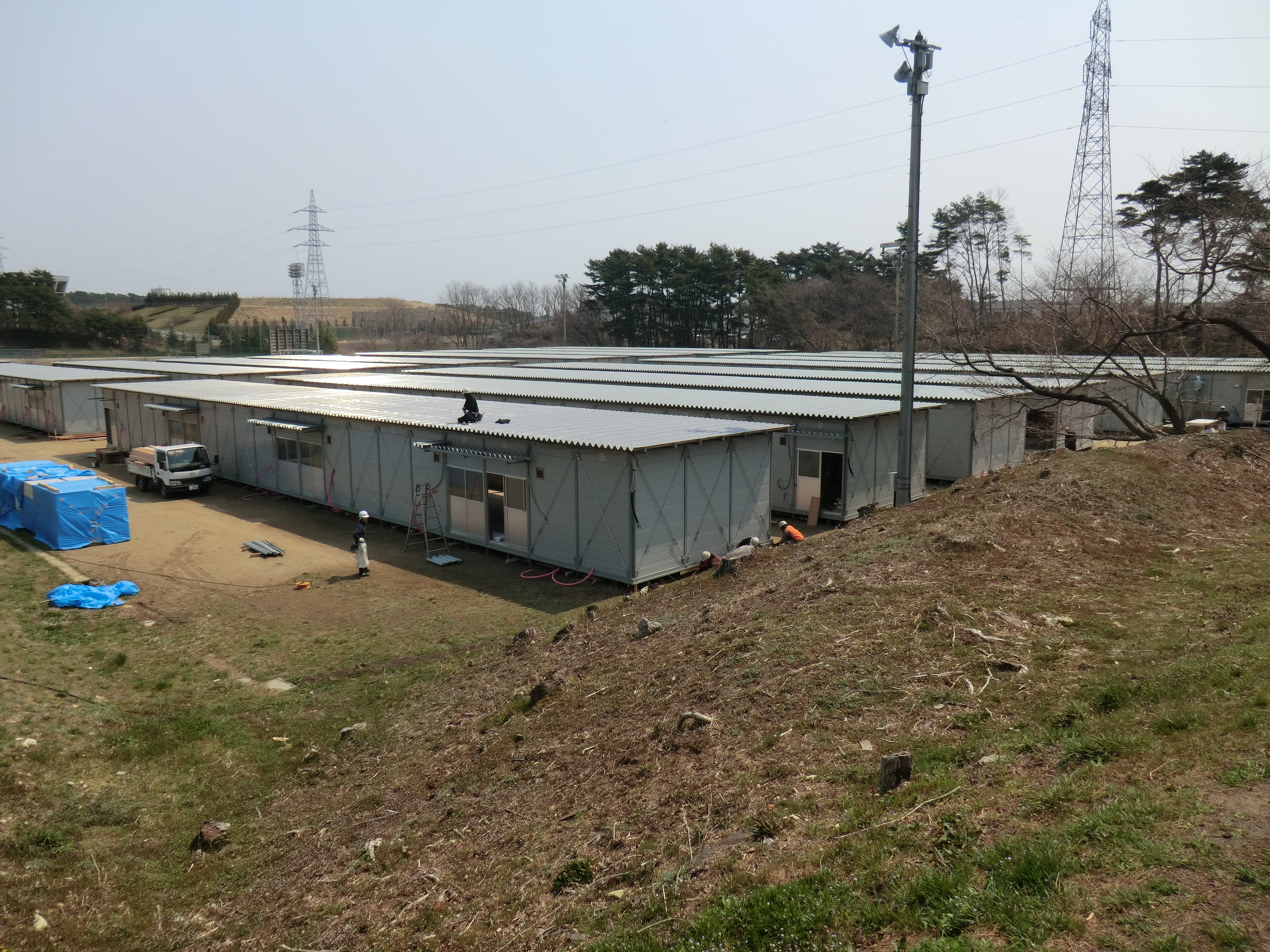
Emergency housing under construction in Shichigahama

The 2011 Tōhoku earthquake and tsunami displaced a large number of people. At its peak in June 2012, the number of evacuees was 346,987 Some earthquake survivors died in shelters or in the process of evacuation. Many shelters struggled to feed evacuees and were not sufficiently equipped medically.

Fuel shortages hampered relief actions. In the first week after the earthquake, supplies of food, water, and medicine were held up due to a fuel shortage and weather conditions. Food was limited for some unevacuated people, and as of late March, some were given one meal a day.

There was a need for temporary housing, as the Japanese government tried to remove evacuees from large shelters, where there were reports of poor sanitary conditions. As of late March, 8,800 temporary units were planned in Iwate, 10,000 in Miyagi, and 19,000 in Fukushima.

At the end of July 2011, the number of evacuees in Japan stood at 87,063. Of those, 12,905 were residing in public shelters and 19,918 were staying in inns or hotels. 46,081 units of temporary housing, about 88 percent of the number planned, had been erected. Evacuees had moved into 73 percent of the temporary housing available.

== Nuclear accidents ==
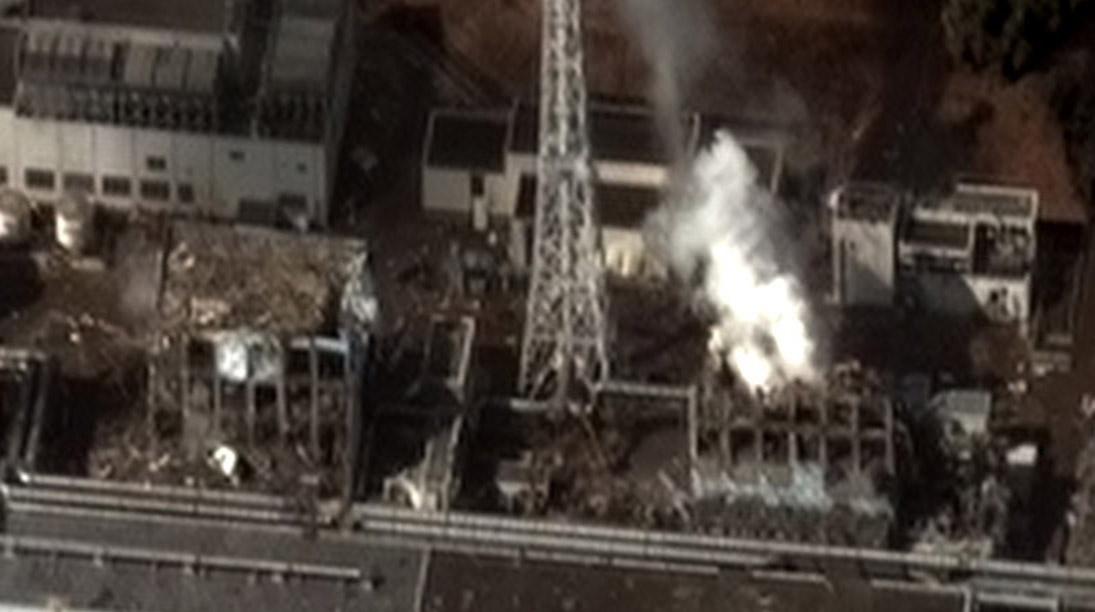
The 2011 Fukushima Daiichi nuclear disaster, the worst nuclear accident in 25 years, displaced 50 000 households after radioactive material leaked into the air, soil and sea.

Following the earthquake, tsunami, and failure of cooling systems at Fukushima I Nuclear Power Plant and issues concerning other nuclear facilities in Japan on 11 March 2011, a nuclear emergency was declared. This was the first time a nuclear emergency had been declared in Japan, and 140,000 residents within 20 km (12 mi) of the plant were evacuated. Explosions and a fire have resulted in dangerous levels of radiation, sparking a stock market collapse and panic-buying in supermarkets. The UK, France and some other countries advised their nationals to consider leaving Tokyo, in response to fears of spreading nuclear contamination. The accidents have drawn attention to ongoing concerns over Japanese nuclear seismic design standards and caused other governments to re-evaluate their nuclear programs. As of April 2011, water is still being poured into the damaged reactors to cool melting fuel rods. John Price, a former member of the Safety Policy Unit at the UK's National Nuclear Corporation, has said that it "might be 100 years before melting fuel rods can be safely removed from Japan's Fukushima nuclear plant".

Problems in stabilizing the Fukushima I plant have hardened attitudes to nuclear power. In June 2011, more than 80 percent of Japanese said they were anti-nuclear and distrusted government information on radiation. It was speculated that this could spell the end of nuclear power in Japan, as "citizen opposition grows and local authorities refuse permission to restart reactors that have undergone safety checks". Local authorities were skeptical that sufficient safety measures had been taken, and reticent to give their permission – now required by law – to bring suspended nuclear reactors back online.

== Economic impact ==
=== Japan ===
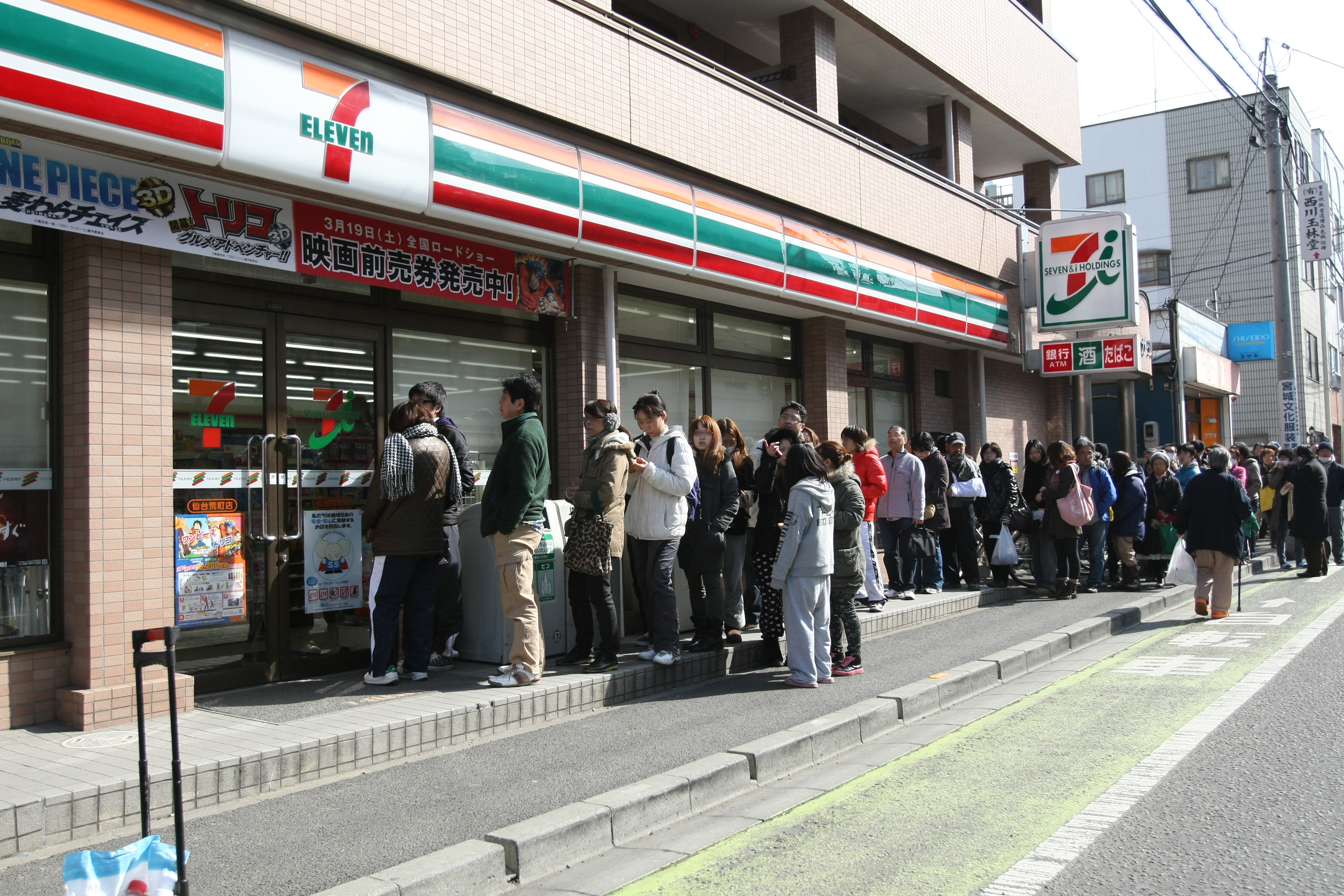
Shoppers line up to buy supplies after the earthquake

Following the earthquake some analysts were predicting that the total recovery costs could reach ¥10 trillion ($122 billion); however, by 12 April 2011 the Japanese government estimated that the cost of just the direct material damage could exceed ¥25 trillion ($300 billion). Japan's real gross domestic product contracted 3.7% for the quarter of January to March 2011.

The northern Tōhoku region, which was most affected, accounts for about 8% of the country's gross domestic product, with factories that manufacture products such as cars and beer, as well as energy infrastructure. It includes northern Miyagi prefecture, where Sendai is, about 300 km (190 mi) northeast of Tokyo. The Miyagi area includes manufacturing and industrial zones with chemical and electronics plants. It is estimated that Miyagi accounts for 1.7% of Japan's gross domestic product.

An estimated 23,600 hectares of farmland, mostly rice paddies, were damaged by the tsunami. Salt left in the soil by the seawater could adversely affect rice crops for years. The affected area accounts for as much as 3%–4% of Japan's rice production. An estimated 4.37 million chickens in northeast Japan died following the earthquake as a result of disruptions in the supply of feed from overseas suppliers.

An estimated 90% of the 29,000 fishing boats in Miyagi, Iwate, and Fukushima prefectures were rendered unusable by the tsunami. Miyagi Prefecture's fishing industry was almost completely destroyed. Twelve thousand of 13,000 registered fishing boats in the prefecture were destroyed or damaged. At least 440 fishermen were killed or missing. The damage to the prefecture's fishing industry was estimated at ¥400 billion (US$5 billion). The total damage to Japan's fishing industry, in seven affected prefectures, was estimated at ¥1.26 trillion (US$11.29 billion).

The earthquake and tsunami have had significant immediate impacts on businesses such as Toyota, Nissan and Honda, which completely suspended auto production until 14 March 2011. Nippon Steel Corporation also suspended production, Toyo Tire & Rubber Company and Sumitomo Rubber Industries shuttered their tire and rubber production lines, while GS Yuasa closed its automotive battery production. This was expected to hinder supply availability for automakers.

Tokyo Electric Power Company, Toshiba, East Japan Railway Company and Shin-Etsu Chemical were suggested as the most vulnerable companies as a result of the earthquake. Sony also suspended production at all its six plants in the area, while Fuji Heavy Industries discontinued production at most of its factories in the Gunma and the Tochigi Prefectures. Other factories suspending operations include Kirin Holdings, GlaxoSmithKline, Nestlé and Toyota amid power cuts. The factory shutdowns, power cuts and the consequent presumed impact on consumer confidence could hurt the national GDP for several months, although economist Michael Boskin predicted "only minimal impact on the Japanese economy overall". Following threats of further nuclear leaks, Blackstone Group LP, Continental AG and BMW were said to be moving their staff outside Japan. Toyota planned to recommence hybrid vehicle production, including the Prius, Lexus HS, and Lexus CT, on 28 March 2011. Honda said that their two Japanese factories will remain closed until 3 April. On 24 March, Nissan said it may move some engine production to the United States due to earthquake damage in Japan. Also on 24 March, IHS Inc. automobile analyst Paul Newton predicted U.S. plants could experience parts shortages by mid-April and that automobile production worldwide could drop by 30%. Toyota expected some shutdowns in North America, but these would be temporary since many needed parts were shipped before the earthquake.

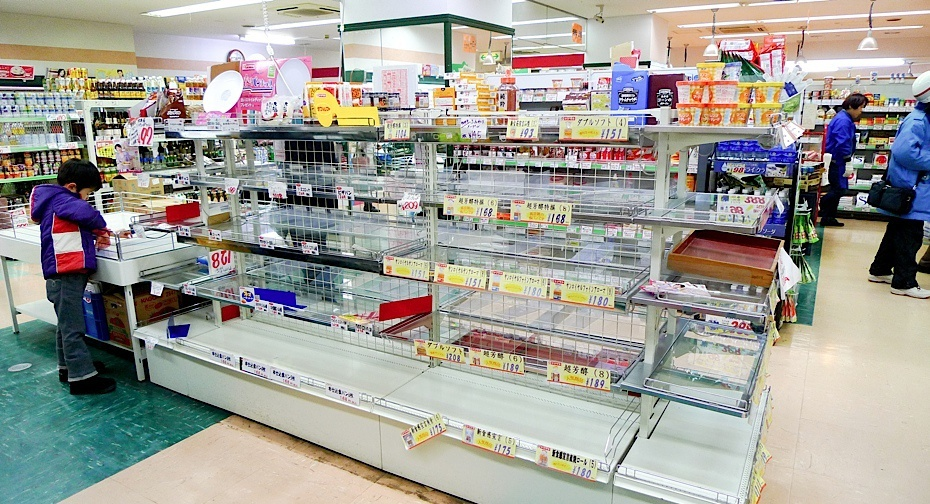
Empty shelves in a Tokyo store

Chief economist for Japan at Credit Suisse, Hiromichi Shirakawa, said in a note to clients that the estimated economic loss may be around $171 billion–$183 billion just to the region hit by the quake and tsunami. On 14 March, the Bank of Japan, in an attempt to maintain market stability, injected 15 trillion yen into the money markets to assure financial stability amid a plunge in stocks and surge in credit risk. After it set up an emergency task force to ensure liquidity in the aftermath of the disaster, governor Masaaki Shirakawa and the bank's board also enlarged a programme to buy government bonds to exchange-traded funds to the tune of 10 trillion yen. The BOJ chief told reporters cash injections will continue as needed. However, following the further nuclear leaks, its actions were read by the market as insufficient despite 8 trillion yen being pumped into the market. On 15 March, the Topix index fell again marking a two-day plunge not seen since 1987 as Japan's default risk surged after Prime Minister Naoto Kan warned of further leaks from the damaged nuclear power plant. Commodities were also significantly lower. Residents of Tokyo were reported to have gone on panic shopping sprees as daily necessities were sought after and gasoline was stocked up with the increasing risk of radioactivity releases.

Chief Cabinet Secretary Yukio Edano said that Japan's government will convene on 13 March to gauge the economic effects of the catastrophe. He told NHK Television that about 200 billion yen that was remaining from the budget for the concurrent fiscal year that would end on 31 March would be used to fund the immediate recovery efforts. Additional measures could also hurt Japan's public debt (which is already the highest in the world). This additional spending could hurt demand for government bonds.

Silicon wafer production has been suspended at factories owned by Shin-Etsu Chemical and MEMC Electronic Materials, which together account for 25% of the global silicon wafer production. The suspension is expected to drastically impact semiconductor production, which is contingent on wafer availability.

Some economic analysts consider that, ultimately, the catastrophe will improve Japan's economy, with increased job availability during restoration efforts. An analyst at JPMorgan Chase, citing the 1989 Loma Prieta earthquake in the San Francisco Bay Area and the Southern California 1994 Northridge earthquake, noted that natural disasters "do eventually boost output". An analyst at Société Générale anticipated that Japan's economy would decline in March 2011 but then revive powerfully in subsequent months. After the Kobe earthquake, industrial output dropped 2.6%, but increased by 2.2% the next month and 1% the following month. Japan's economy then accelerated substantially through the next two years, at more than its former rate. Others believed that the catastrophe would harm the economy. Some analysts have argued that those who predict that the reconstruction effort could help Japan's economy have fallen prey to the broken window fallacy. On 24 March, an executive of Bank of Japan's Osaka branch said he expected "a big decline in production, [leading to] an adjustment in the economy initially with exports and inventories falling and imports rising... Demand created by reconstruction projects will emerge after that." The government said that reconstruction in the ongoing year could raise GDP by 5 trillion yen to 7.75 trillion yen.

By the end of July 2011, 47 percent of the 22.63 million tons of debris in Iwate, Miyagi, and Fukushima Prefectures had been removed. By 11 July 2011, 73.7% of farming businesses affected by the quake and tsunami in eight prefectures had resumed operations while 35.5% of fishing entities had returned to business, according to the Japanese agricultural ministry. The ministry excluded Fukushima from the results because of the ongoing nuclear crisis.

The reconstruction of damaged areas in Tōhoku beginning in 2011 produced a boom in construction jobs and business in the area. As a result, cities like Sendai benefited from an increase in residents and wages for construction-related jobs rose.

By March 2012, 644 companies in Japan had been forced into bankruptcy by the disaster. The companies included 157 service companies, 150 manufacturers, and 113 wholesalers. The companies left behind liabilities of ¥925.4 billion (US$8 billion) and had employed 11,412 people.

=== Global financial impact ===
In the immediate aftermath of the earthquake, Japan's Nikkei stock market index saw its futures slide 5% in after-market trading. The Bank of Japan released a statement proclaiming that it would do its utmost to ensure financial market stability. On Tuesday, 15 March, news of rising radiation levels caused the Nikkei to drop over 1,000 points or 10.6% (16% for the week).

Other stock markets around the world were also affected; the German DAX lost 1.2% within minutes. Hong Kong's Hang Seng index fell by 1.8%, while South Korea's Kospi index slumped by 1.3%. By the end of trading on the day of the earthquake, the MSCI Asia Pacific Index had dropped by 1.8%. Major U.S. stock market indexes rose between 0.5% and 0.7%. Oil prices also dropped as a result of the closure of Japanese refineries, despite the ongoing violence in Libya and expected demonstrations in Saudi Arabia. US crude dropped as low as US$99.01 from $100.08 by lunchtime, with Brent Crude falling $2.62 to $112.81. In Hong Kong, Financial Secretary John Tsang warned investors to "take extra care" as the earthquake may have a short-term impact on local stock markets.

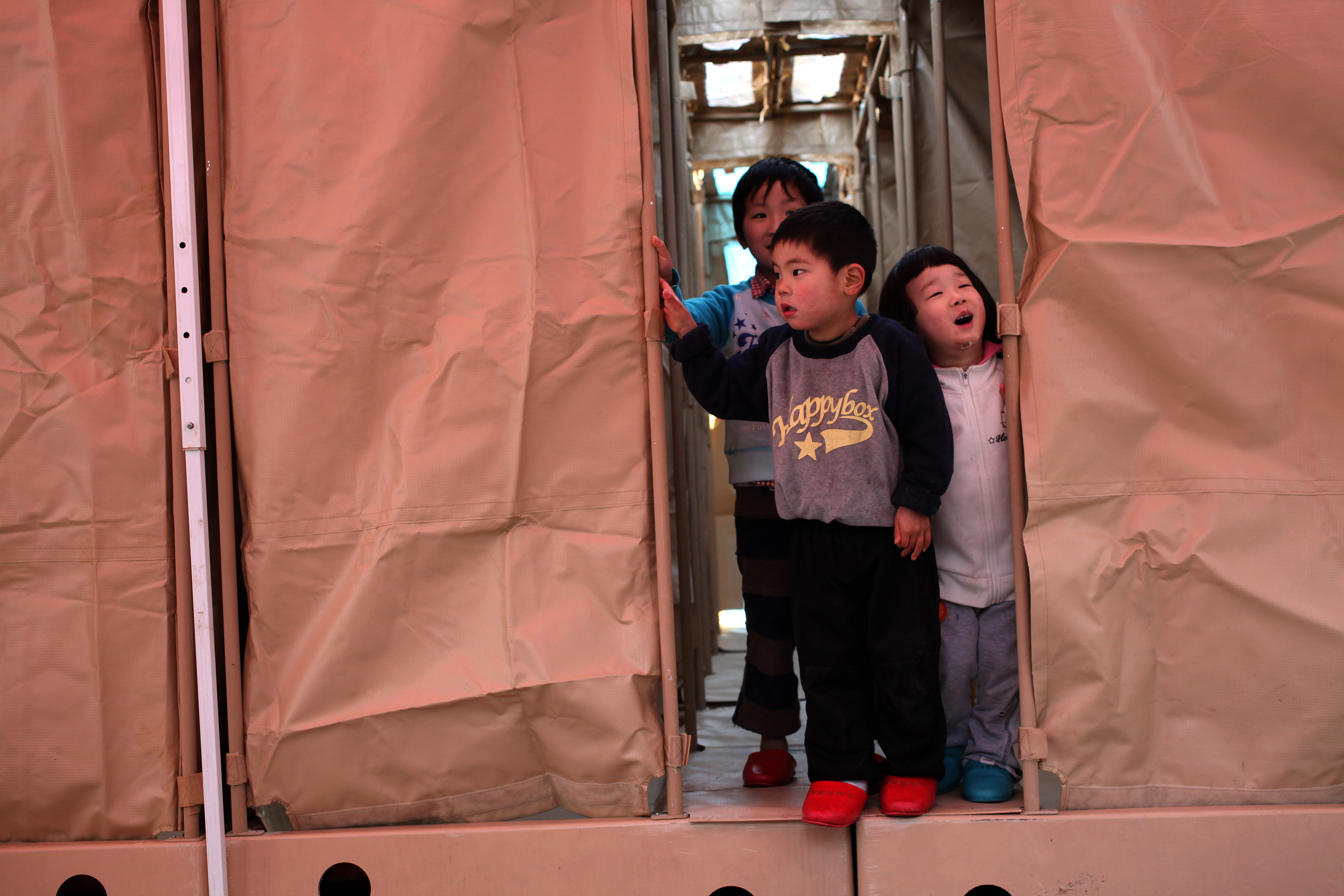
Children explore a temporary shower unit in Miyagi Prefecture

The share prices of the biggest reinsurance companies Munich Re and Swiss Reinsurance Company fell following the earthquake on speculation that they may face losses "somewhere in the $10 billion range" even after certain costs were absorbed by Japan's primary insurers and the government.

The Japanese yen soared against most major currencies following the earthquake and reached a post-World War II high of 76.25 yen to the US dollar on speculation that Japanese investors would repatriate assets to pay for rebuilding. Since Japan's economy relies heavily on exports, a stronger yen, which makes Japanese goods more expensive for foreign buyers, had the potential to further hinder its economic growth. The resulting financial markets' instability prompted the G7 to meet on 17 March, resulting in an agreement on joint forex intervention to sell yen against the dollar; it was the first such move since 2000.

Peter Bradford, a former member of the United States' Nuclear Regulatory Commission, said that the impact on the nuclear power plant was "obviously a significant setback for the so-called nuclear renaissance. The image of a nuclear power plant blowing up before your eyes on a television screen is a first."

== Response in Japan ==
=== Government ===
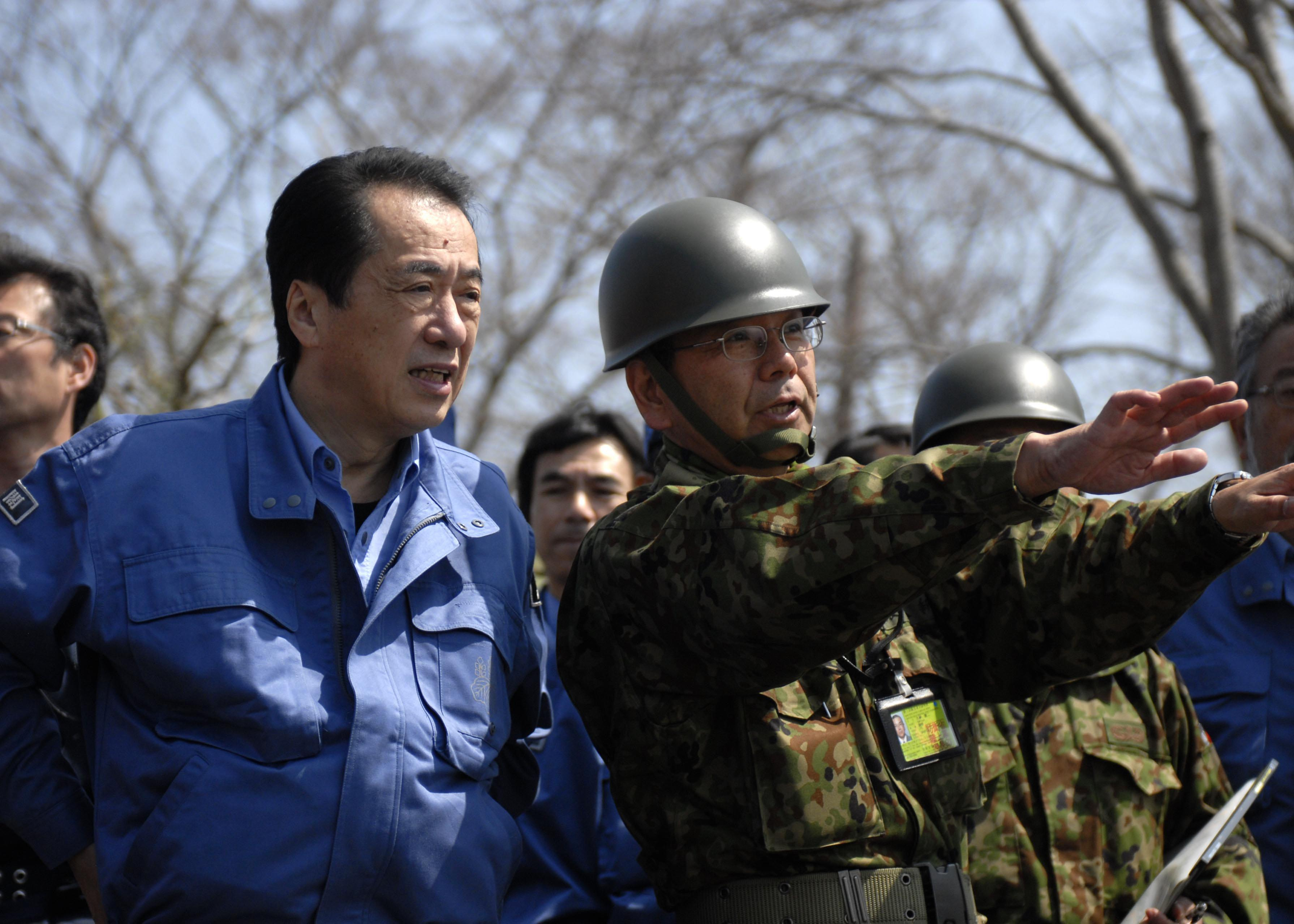
Prime Minister Naoto Kan is briefed about the state of Ishinomaki Commercial High School in Ishinomaki, Miyagi by Lt. Gen. Yuji Kuno, the Commander of the 6th Division of the Japan Ground Self-Defense Force

Then Prime Minister Naoto Kan announced that the government had mobilized the Japan Self-Defense Forces in earthquake disaster zones. He asked the Japanese public to act calmly and tune into media for updated information. He reported that numerous nuclear power plants were automatically shut down to prevent damage and releases of radioactivity. He set up emergency headquarters in his office to coordinate the government's response.

Weeks after the disaster, some services such as transportation were somewhat restored. The power supply continued to be affected with numerous outages and blackouts. The effects within the power supply caused manufacturing reductions and loss of businesses, especially in the technology area.

Evacuation shelters faced a shortage of potable water, food, blankets and bathroom facilities, as the government arranged these necessities to be delivered to where they were needed from areas of Japan and abroad. Dropping temperatures, due to the disruption in electrical and gas lines, caused further problems at shelters. As of 17 March 2011, 336,521 people in Japan had been displaced from their homes and were residing elsewhere, including in 2,367 shelters.

A Japanese urban search and rescue team sent to New Zealand following the February 2011 Christchurch earthquake was recalled. On 27 March 2011, Japan's National Police Agency reported that 14 of its officers had died in the line of duty in the disaster and a further 16 were missing.

The government in Japan committed to cleaning up the damage from the disaster, an effort forecast to cost a total of ¥1 trillion (US$8 billion).

The government set up an advisory panel of intellectual figures on 14 April 2011, named the Reconstruction Design Council in Response to the Great East Japan Earthquake (ja:東日本大震災復興構想会議) and chaired by Makoto Iokibe, President of the National Defense Academy of Japan. The Council submitted the first set of recommendations to the government for the third supplementary budget for full-fledged reconstruction measures on 25 June. The government struggled to produce a plan for the clean up of the 2.8 million tons of debris in Fukushima Prefecture, as much of it is radioactive.

Many seaside communities in Japan have reexamined their tsunami defenses and reaction plans in response to the disaster.

The public and companies were encouraged to conserve electricity in the 2011 summer months (Setsuden).

In March 2012 the Tokyo Metropolitan Government passed the Metropolitan Tokyo Ordinance on Measures for Stranded Individuals requiring employers to stockpile food, water and emergency supplies at their places of business. It came into effect on 1 April 2013.

Japanese media reported in 2012 that up to 25% of special funds allocated by the government for disaster recovery and relief were being used outside the disaster area on projects unrelated to the earthquake and tsunami. The projects included ¥500 million (US$4 million) for road construction in Okinawa, ¥330 million (US$3 million) for repairs to National Stadium, ¥10.7 million (US$95 thousand) in subsidies for nuclear research, ¥30 million (US$269 thousand) for power shovels for prisons in Hokkaido and Saitama, and ¥2.3 billion (US$20 million) to combat the Sea Shepherd Conservation Society. In the meantime, in October 2012 the damaged towns in Tōhoku reported that they were still struggling to recover from the disaster.

=== National Diet Library ===
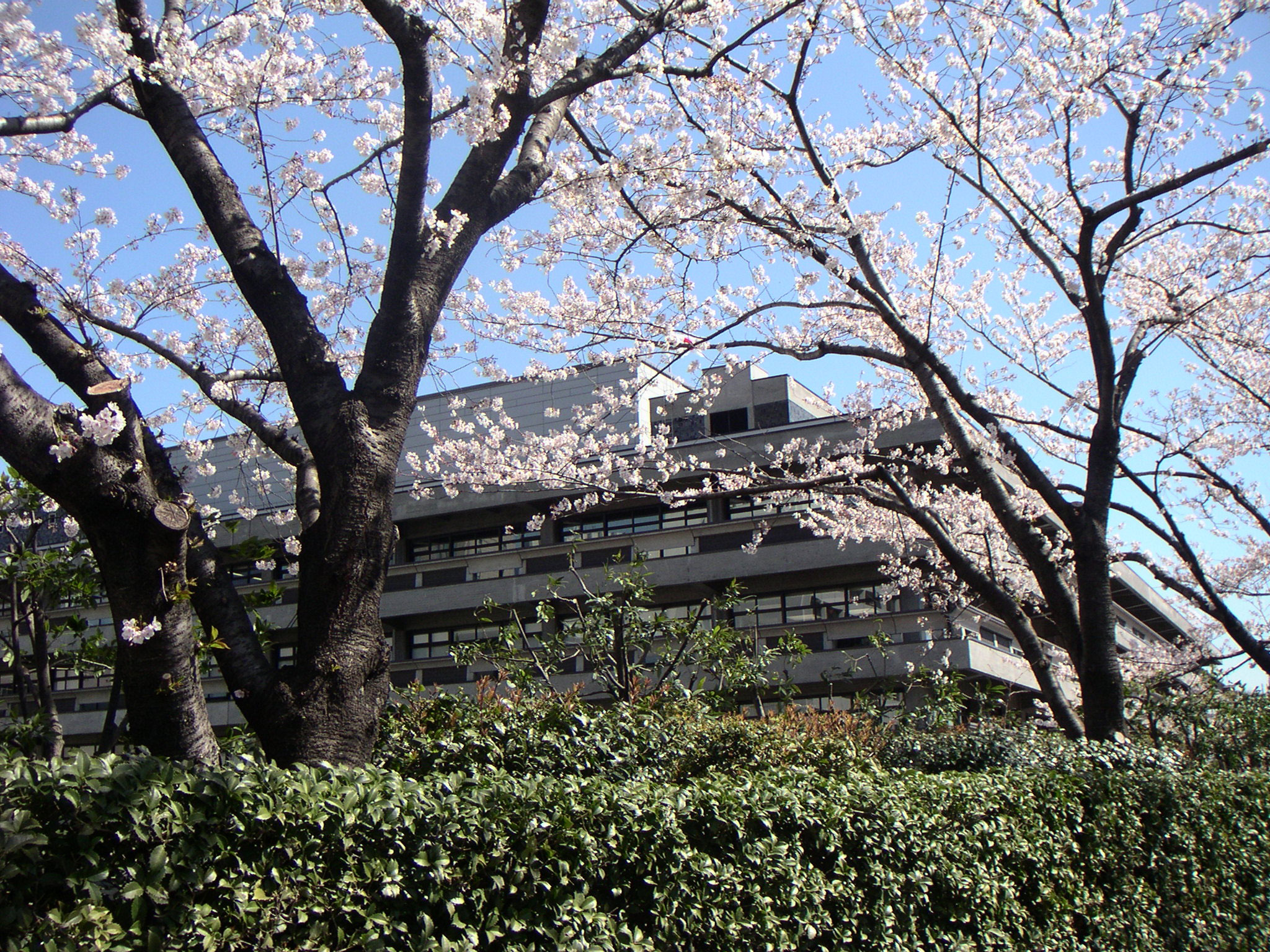
National Diet Library

Efforts by the National Diet Library were deployed toward the preservation of archival material related to the Great East Japan Earthquake. On 10 May 2011, a panel of experts published its Seven Principles for the Reconstruction Framework, with the first principle pressing the need to construct permanent memory of the natural disaster. In response, many municipal government put in place disaster archives. In July 2011, the Japanese government published its Basic Guidelines for Reconstruction in Response to the Great East Japan Earthquake and made a commitment in providing full access to its collected disaster records.

This commitment led to the creation of the National Diet Library Great East Japan Archives, otherwise known as HINAGIKU, in March 2013. The database is the main repository for archival material related to the 2011 disasters and is also a hub for disaster records collected by various other municipalities and for records relating to other Japanese natural disasters. It provides access to more than 3,7 million records related to earthquakes and other natural disasters in Japan (notably the Kumamoto Earthquake). The records consist of reports, photographs, scientific papers, and many others.

However, the content hosted by HINAGIKU might partly be in jeopardy. Indeed, considering the fact that many of the disaster archives that were built during the early months succeeding May 2011 entirely depended on temporary funds, many of those archives might close someday. This would mean that disaster records would have to be taken in charge by the National Diet Library or another archival repository in order to keep them available; however it is unsure how this would be done at the moment. Another pressing issue is metadata harmonization, whereas not all archival repositories curate their disaster records with the same standards. This might hinder findings in HINAGIKU.

=== Citizens ===
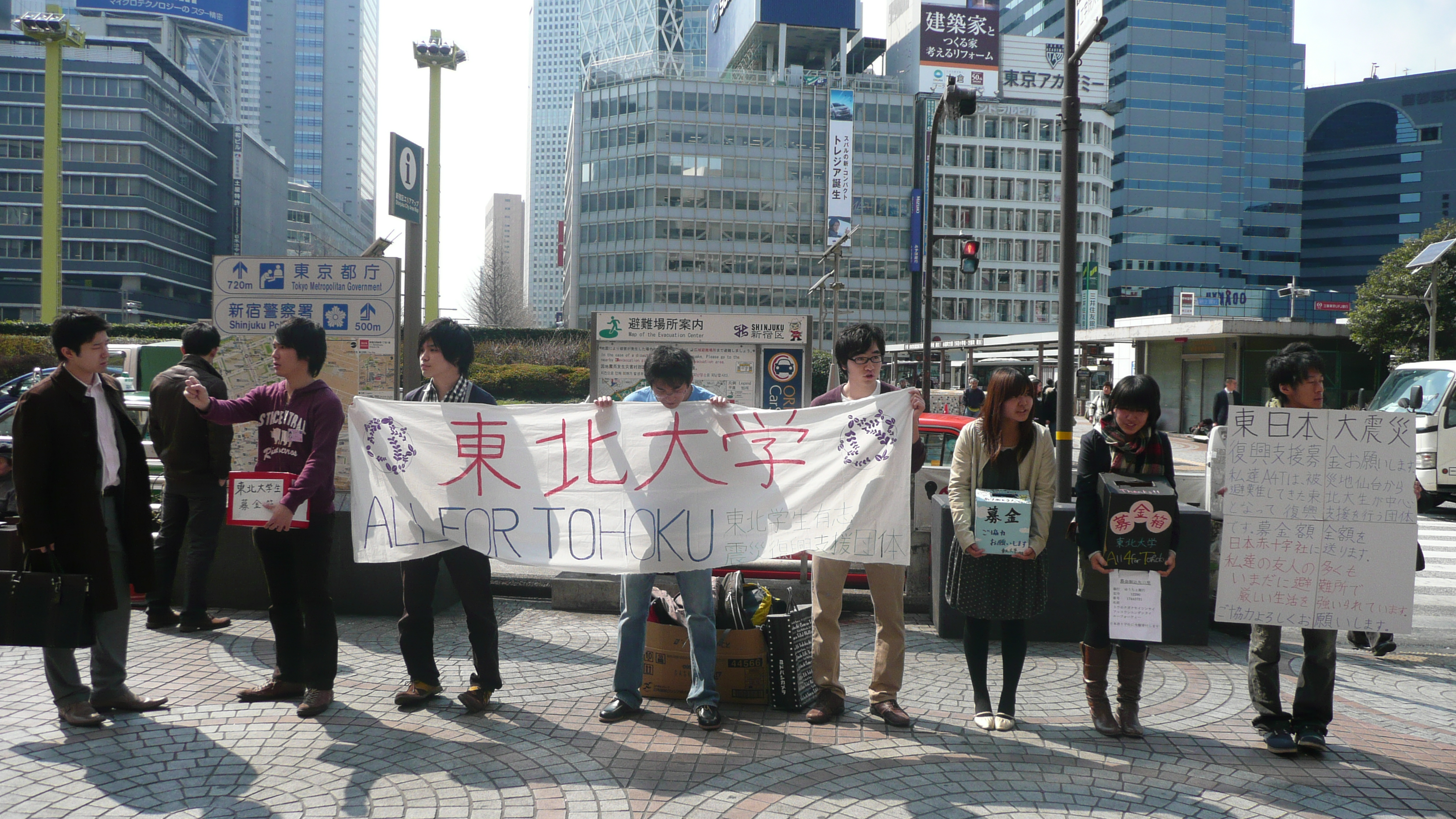
Fundraising drive for disaster victims

There was a notable lack of disorder immediately following the earthquake. This was attributed to Japanese forbearance, an attitude sometimes referred to as gaman, and to laws that encourage honesty and a strong police presence. One source reported that the three main clans of Yakuza gangs were enforcing order in their territories. Mark MacKinnon wrote in The Globe and Mail, "As one catastrophe piled on top of another, a very Japanese deference to authority emerged, as well as a national desire to see civility prevail, no matter the circumstances."

Some people devastated by the quake began, however, to question the government's effort in providing food, clothing, electricity, heat, and phone service. Chief Cabinet Secretary Yukio Edano later said, "In hindsight, we could have moved a little quicker in assessing the situation and coordinating all that information and provided it faster."

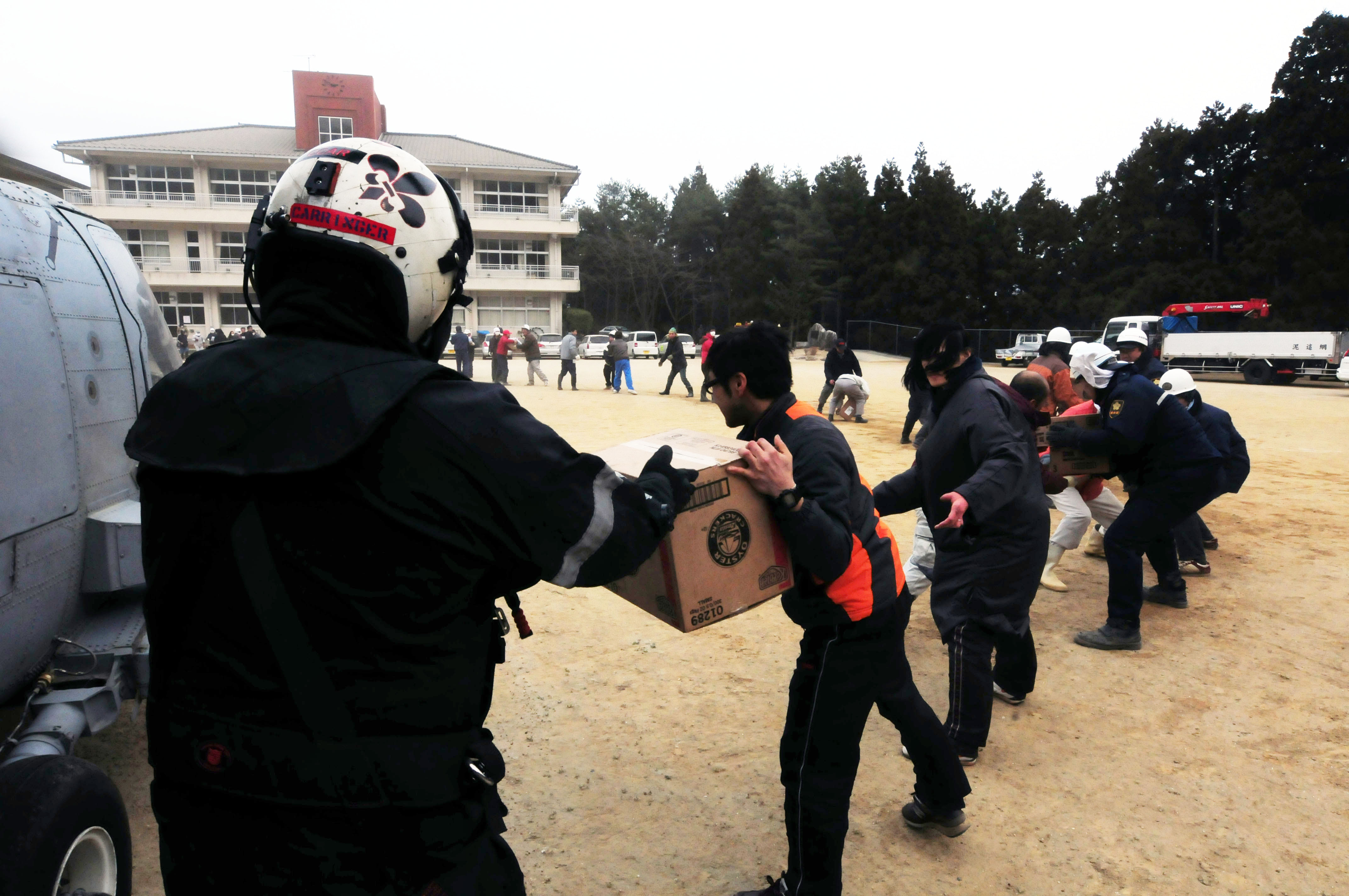
Civilians form a bucket brigade to speed unloading of a U.S. military relief supply flight

Some ten days after the quake, reports began to emerge of incidents of looting and theft in quake and tsunami-hit areas. By 20 March 2011, 250 thefts, with ¥4.9 million (US$43 thousand) in merchandise stolen from stores and ¥5.8 million (US$52 thousand) in cash, were reported to the Miyagi Prefectural Police. Witnesses reported thieves stealing cash and bank books from smashed houses, looting goods from stores, and siphoning gas from abandoned or damaged vehicles. Around ¥40 million (US$358 thousand) was reportedly stolen from a bank in Kesennuma, Miyagi.

Between 11 March and the end of June 2011, a total of ¥684.4 million (US$6 million) was stolen from ATMs and convenience stores in Fukushima, Miyagi, and Iwate prefectures. Of the money stolen, ¥477 million (US$4 million) from 34 ATM thefts took place in Fukushima Prefecture, 80% of that in the 20-km evacuation zone around the Daiichi nuclear plant. The number of thefts from homes and stores during the same period in those three prefectures stood at 1,233, about 1.5 times the number from the same period in 2010. Of them, 194 were in the nuclear evacuation zone, 19 times the number from 2010. The rumors which had spread immediately after the quake of rampant rapes by armed gangs proved to be false, as reports of sexual assaults actually fell 35.7 percent to 81 cases. Only one sexual assault was reported occurring in one of the evacuee centers. Throughout Japan, there were 51 reported cases of scams or frauds related to the disaster, with losses amounting to around ¥12.6 million (US$112 thousand).

Even though there are no regulations imposed by the Japan government for conservation, many people practised self-restraint by conserving resources and cancelling celebrations, this reaction was attributed by experts as a way of coping with the traumatising scale of losses and the spreading fear of radioactive fallout.

As of December 2011, there were 2,439 complaints lodged with the National Consumer Affairs Center of Japan concerning earthquake-related scams from throughout Japan. A total of ¥970 million had been paid or lost by those targeted by the alleged scams. The reported scams included exorbitant house and roof repairs, faulty radiation gauges, and water filters touted to remove radioactivity.

Non-government organizations, including Peace Boat, have assisted in cleaning up the disaster area since the quake.

=== Non-citizen residents of Japan ===
Approximately 531,000 non-Japanese residing in Japan departed the country after the quake and tsunami, including approximately 25% of foreigners living in Tokyo. Foreigners living in Japan and the English-language media in Japan coined the term "flyjin" (or fly-jin), a play on the Japanese word gaijin, as a label for the non-Japanese residents who fled in the wake of the disaster.

9,720 dependents of United States military and government civilian employees in Japan fled the country, mainly to the United States. The United States spent $11.7 million on chartered aircraft to fly the dependents out of the country.

The number of foreign residents in Japan dropped by 55,000 in 2011, with Iwate losing 15.5%, Fukushima 15.1%, and Miyagi 13.2% of their populations of non-Japanese. The total reduction in foreigners nationwide was 2.6% of the pre-quake total.

== International response ==
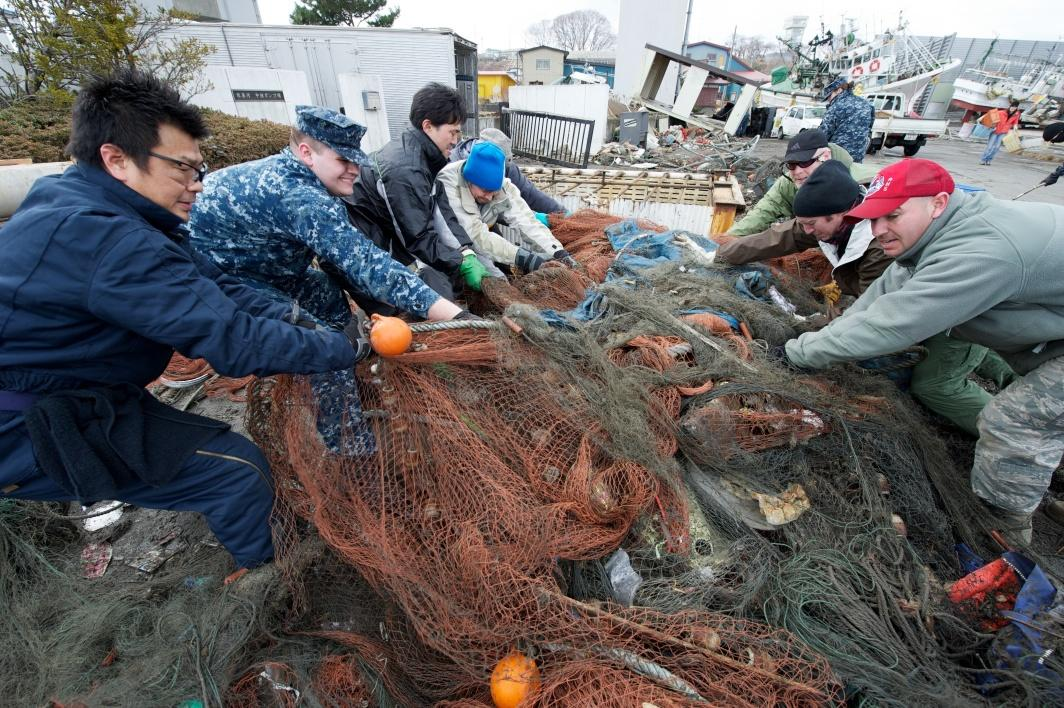
US and French military troops aid civilians in the cleanup

=== Request for assistance ===
Japan specifically requested teams from Australia, New Zealand, South Korea, and the United States; it also requested, via its space agency JAXA, the activation of the International Charter on Space and Major Disasters, allowing diverse satellite imagery of affected regions to be readily shared with rescue and aid organizations.

=== World involvement ===
Japan received messages of condolence and offers of assistance from a range of international leaders. According to Japan's foreign ministry on 19 March 2011, 128 countries and 33 international organizations had offered assistance to Japan. Several countries, including Australia, China, India, New Zealand, South Korea, and the United States, sent search-and-rescue teams, and dozens of other countries and major international relief organizations such as the Red Cross and Red Crescent pledged financial and material support to Japan. The EU has also been more than ready to offer its support to them: "An earthquake powerful enough to make the world wobble on its axis, a massive tsunami, an emergency in nuclear power stations. Any one of these would be a tragedy. Thousands of people have died and this has turned this tragedy into a catastrophe," said Herman van Rompuy, President of the European Council. Twenty Member States have offered assistance through the European Civil Protection Mechanism. Australian Prime Minister Julia Gillard was the first foreign leader to visit the earthquake site.

The Fukushima incident brought the issue of nuclear power to the fore internationally, causing an anti-nuclear demonstration of 50,000 people in Stuttgart and the cancellation of a pro-nuclear press conference in the United Kingdom.

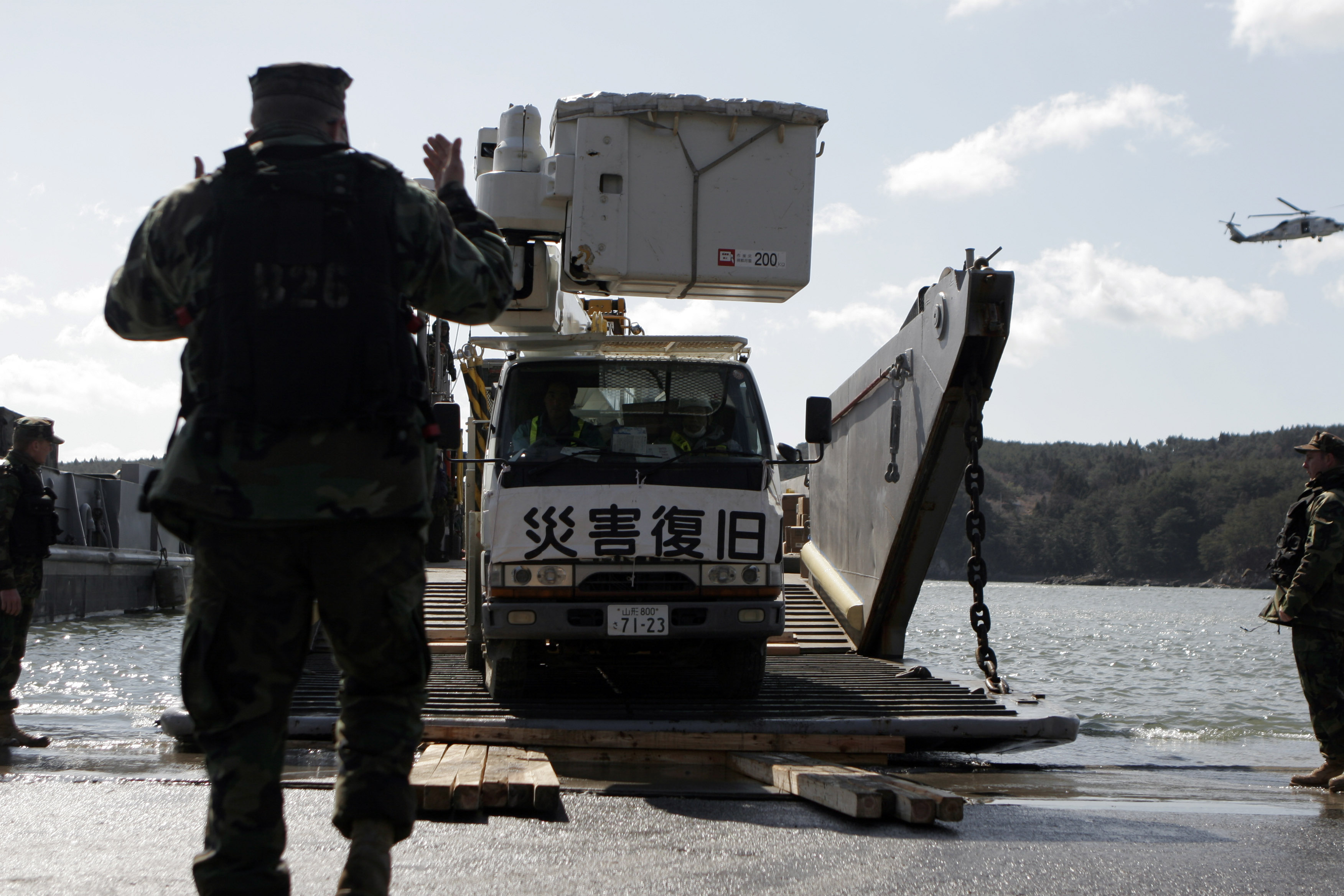
Electric utility trucks being unloaded in the tsunami zone

While stepping-up monitoring of radiation levels on its own shores in face of the Fukushima nuclear power plant crisis, China, a major supporter in the relief operations in Japan in spite of its own current earthquake crisis, had officially begun evacuating its citizens from those worst-hit areas in Japan on 15 March 2011. France had also officially begun evacuation of its nationals from the worst-hit areas, dispatching airliners to assist in the evacuation on 16 March 2011. Also responding to potential danger of radiation exposure, the government of Austria had relocated its embassy from Tokyo to Osaka some 400 km (250 mi) away. The U.S. Embassy in Japan had advised evacuation of all American nationals to outside an 80 km (50 mi) radius from the Fukushima power plant on 16 March 2011, which is a far greater distance than the 20 km (12 mi) evacuation zone the Japanese government had already recommended for all inhabitants of the affected region, but later increased to 30 km (19 mi) on 25 March 2011.

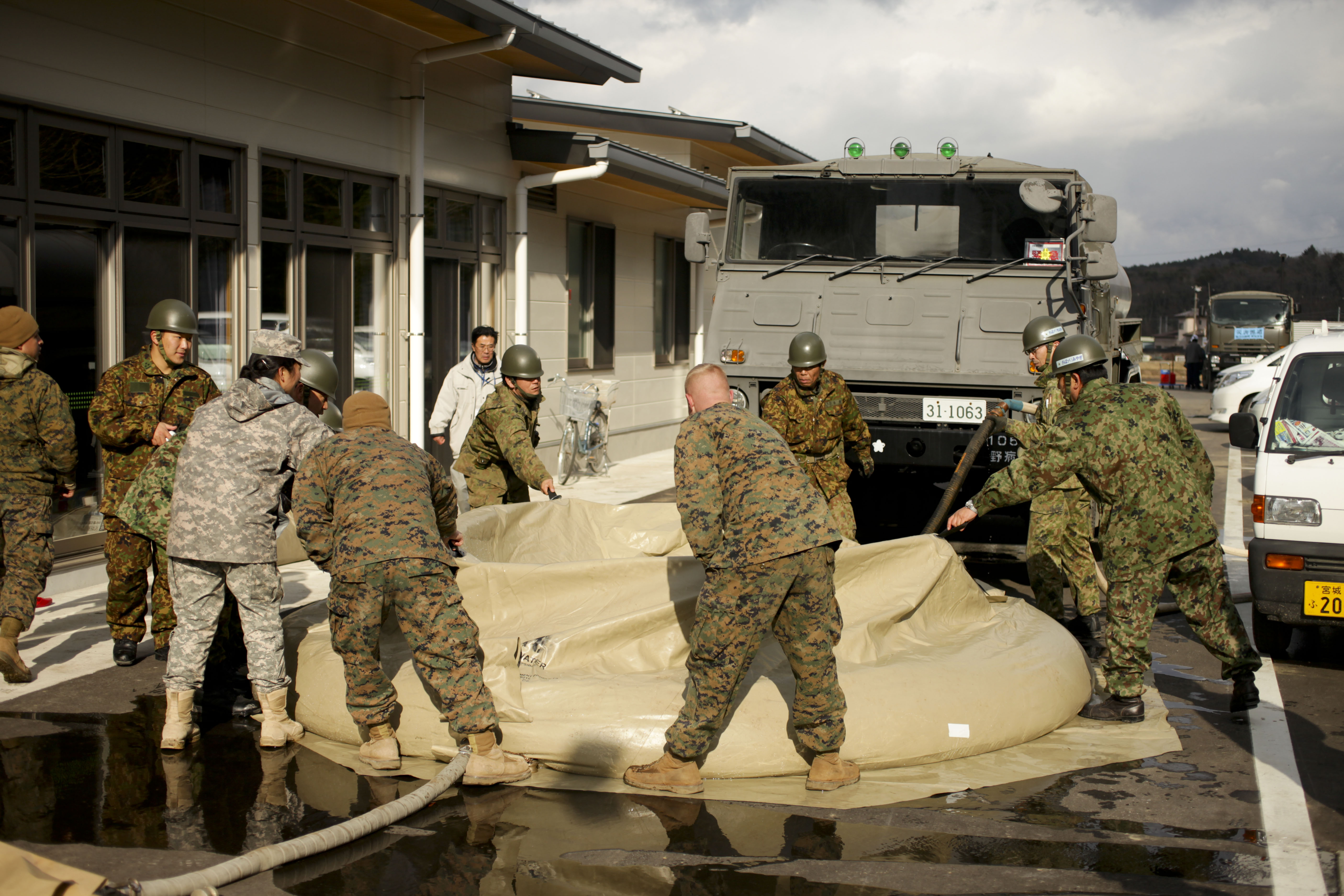
Japanese and US military personnel construct temporary buildings for disaster victims

In many countries, both government and private aid campaigns have been organized to offer money and support to the victims and general populace of Japan. Social buying sites have launched on-line campaigns in which several million dollars were raised for relief organizations working in Japan. As of 3 April 2011, the Japanese Red Cross had received over $1 billion in donations in response to the disaster, and dispatched more than 200 emergency relief teams to the disaster zone. However it received criticism from some quarters for not yet having dispensed any cash aid to survivors. The American Red Cross said that it had received $120 million in donations from the US public. The Singapore Red Cross and Japan Association said that, as of 31 March 2011, residents of Singapore had donated S$ 3.15 million for disaster relief.

As of May 2011, contributors in South Korea had donated ₩56 billion won (US$50 million) to various organizations for the disaster relief effort. By May 2011 the people of Taiwan had donated or pledged 5.9 billion Taiwan dollars (US$216 million).

Operation Tomodachi, which means Friend in Japanese, was the United States military operation to provide assistance and humanitarian aid to Japan. Twenty-thousand US military personnel, including 19 naval vessels and 120 aircraft, were mobilized to provide assistance or move supplies to the disaster area. The US aid efforts were conducted under the direction of Japanese government or military authorities. The Yomiuri Shimbun reported that the "coordinated relief activities at the disaster sites are expected to deepen the Japan-U.S. alliance."

A number of religious groups donated funds, equipment, supplies, or volunteer time. The Hinokishin Brigade of Tenrikyo donated ¥920 million, Sōka Gakkai ¥500 million, Risshō Kōsei Kai ¥500 million, Seicho-no-Ie ¥250 million, Unification Church ¥160 million, Science of Happiness ¥61 million, and various other Buddhist charities ¥340 million.

=== Information and support ===
Among several resources offered to help find earthquake survivors and obtain information about people in Japan are: Disaster Message Board Web171 operated by Nippon Telegraph and Telephone, the International Committee of the Red Cross, American Red Cross, Google Person Finder, websites of the Australian Embassy, US Department of State, UK Foreign and Commonwealth Office, and the Honshū Quake wiki operated by the CrisisCommons volunteer community. On 27 March 2013, Google released street view imagery for the city of Namie within the exclusion zone, following requests from former residents.

=== Asteroid naming ===
Multiple asteroids have been named in relation to the earthquake. In the Asteroids, Comets, Meteors 2012 conference which was held at Toki Messe in Niigata, International Astronomical Union approved naming 12 asteroids after areas affected by the earthquake, in hopes for their recovery. The 12 asteroids, including 14701 Aizu, 19534 Miyagi, 19691 Iwate, 19701 Aomori, 19713 Ibaraki, 19731 Tochigi, 20613 Chibaken, 21966 Hamadori, 22719 Nakadori, 22745 Rikuzentakata, 22885 Sakaemura, and 22914 Tsunanmachi, were all discovered by Lowell Observatory in the Lowell Observatory Near-Earth-Object Search project, which has the right to propose the naming of these asteroids and is officially the proposer of these names, although the naming proposal itself was initially drafted by local organizing committee for the conference.

The asteroid 23649 Tohoku is also named after the area affected by the earthquake to commemorate all the people who died during the disaster, asteroid 29157 Higashinihon is so named in hope for recovery from the earthquake, and asteroid 31152 Daishinsai is also named after the earthquake to commemorate the event and wish for people that died from it.

== Debris overseas ==
On 21 September 2012, the National Oceanic and Atmospheric Administration announced that a large blue plastic storage bin from Fukushima was the first confirmed piece of marine debris that had arrived in waters off Hawaii. This was the 12th confirmed piece of Japanese tsunami debris to arrive in United States or Canadian waters.

On 30 November 2012, Prime Minister Noda announced the Government of Japan had decided to extend an ex gratia gift to the government of the United States in the wake of the Great East Japan earthquake to demonstrate goodwill with respect to tsunami debris.

During March 2013, a boat lost during the tsunami washed up on the shores of Washington, U.S. carrying five trapped live fish. One surviving tsunami fish was put on display at the Seaside Aquarium. Between September 2015 and March 2016, 64 items that have washed up on the coastline of North America have been identified as being debris from the tsunami.

As of 2015, it was reported that most of the debris had been removed. At this time, the process of construction for areas of rebuilding had begun.

== Reconstruction and tsunami preparedness ==
After the 2011 Tohoku tsunami, the Japanese government focused on protection from tsunamis that may return within 100 years, which they classified as hazard level L1. The 2011 Tohoku tsunami itself was classified as hazard level L2, and considered a once-in-a-millennium event, although it may be comparable to the 1611 Keicho Sanriku tsunami. Preventing flooding by a L2 tsunami was considered excessively costly and impractical: for a L2 tsunami, damage mitigation is based on non-structural measures such as hazard maps and evacuations.

Structural adaptation to tsunamis was largely based on building seawalls. The new seawalls are higher than the seawalls that proved largely ineffective in 2011. Other measures included building expendable infrastructure in floodable zones, moving residences to higher altitude, and building on artificially raised ground.

The government of Naoto Kan initially proposed a reconstruction framework based on "harmony among nature, human beings and technology". After Kan resigned in August 2011, the government decided and funded the systematic building of concrete seawalls, with little consultation of the local population. This more traditional approach was criticized as symptomatic of the collusion between the government and the construction industry, and of the colonial mentality of the government towards Tohoku.

The tsunami significantly affected the area of Rikuzentakata, Japan, 80% of its residential areas were destroyed as well as 1,700 residential deaths. A decade later, this area is still rebuilding (as of 2021). There is now a 12.5-meter seawall that has been built. Raising the land by 10 meters was also done at this time. There was also a plan as of 2017 to plant trees since over 70,000 trees were washed away by the tsunami's waves.

The damage that this disaster caused was long-lasting and took a decade to recover. Currently, there are still 2,500 victims of this disaster that are marked as missing.

== See also ==
- Hideaki Akaiwa
- Ryou-Un Maru
