= Kariyushi shirt =

Dress shirt style from Okinawa, Japan

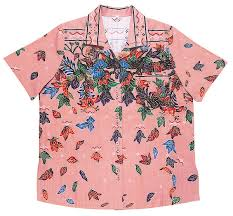
A shirt of many colours

The Kariyushi shirt (かりゆしウェア, kariyushi wear) is a style of dress shirt originating in Okinawa Prefecture, Japan. Similar to aloha shirts, these shirts are mainly worn in summer. The shirts are printed, mostly short-sleeved, and collared. Kariyushi shirts may be worn as casual, informal wear, or as dresswear. First introduced in 1970 to promote tourism to Okinawa Prefecture, the style gained popularity in 2000 when heads of state wore them during the 26th G8 summit which was held in Okinawa. These shirts are promoted as part of the Cool Biz campaign by the Government of Japan. Kariyushi means "harmony" or "happiness" in Central Okinawan language.

== History ==
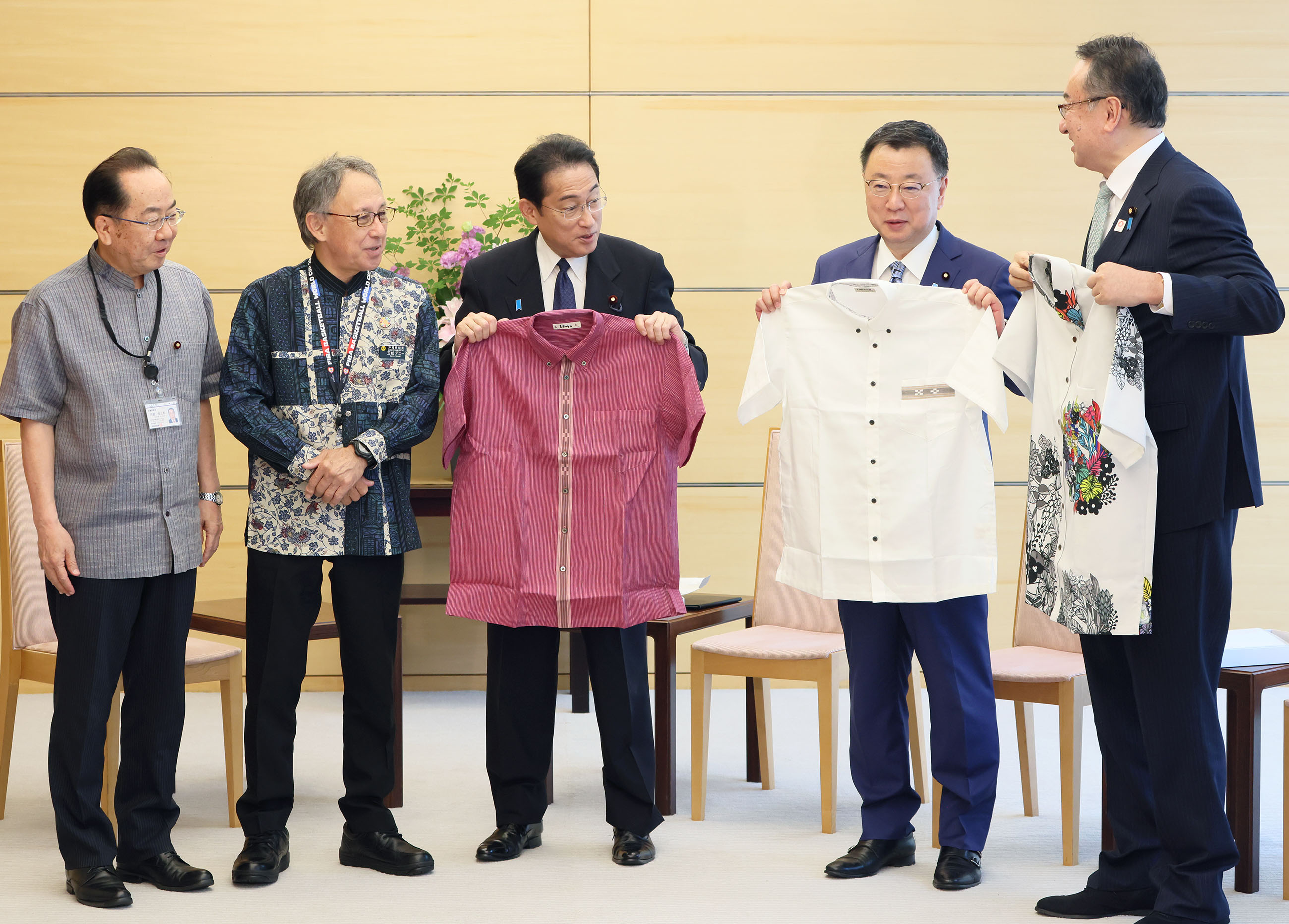
Presentation of Kariyushi Shirt from the Governor of Okinawa Prefecture

In 1970, the Okinawa Tourism Association started selling aloha shirts under the name of Okinawa shirts in order to promote tourism to Okinawa Prefecture. The initial campaign was unsuccessful, leaving piles of unsold merchandise. These leftovers were worn by hotel association members. The popularity of the shirts spread during the time of the second oil crisis. At first, the shirts were limited to variations using motifs of traditional arts such as bingata or Yaeyama minsa. Eventually, multiple individuals related to the tourist trade such as hotel staff, travelers and tour guides began to wear them.

The Mensōre Okinawa Kenmin Undō Suishin Kyōgikai, a newly formed coalition of Okinawan tourism organizations, decided to produce shirts featuring Okinawa characteristics and named them kariyushi shirts in 1990. Kariyushi means "harmony" or "happiness" in Okinawan. In 1997, the Okinawa Hotel Ryokan Association started promoting another type of aloha-like shirts named tropical wear as well as tropical Friday (Okinawan version of casual Friday). This resulted in their use in government offices.

Year 2000 was a turning point for Kariyushi shirts. The name of the shirts was standardized as kariyushi wear (かりゆしウェア). In 2000 each head of state wore one during the 26th G8 summit held in Okinawa. During this time, variations in the shirt design appeared and the shirts became popular for use among government employees, bank workers and people in the general business sector. According to the Okinawa Apparel Sewing Industrial Association, over 490,000 shirts were sold in 2014, compared to 44,000 in 1997. Okinawa also holds a textile contest once every year, allowing contestants to design a kariyushi shirt.

In 2005, when the "Summer casual dress" idea was introduced mainly for the Ministry of the Environment and Ministry of Economy, Trade and Industry, Yuriko Koike, the environment minister, also took on the responsibility of minister for Okinawa and promoted the kariyushi shirt as part of the Cool Biz campaign. From June 1, the beginning of the promotion period, a number of the staff who worked at the Okinawa Development and Promotion Bureau wore the shirts as well as the Prime Minister of Japan at that time, Junichiro Koizumi. Koizumi had already worn the Kariyushi shirt at the 2003 Japan Pacific Islands Summit, which was held in Okinawa.

The NHK Okinawa bureau asked all news reporters on the weekday evening local news program Haisai! Terebi Sukasu to wear the kariyushi shirt from June to October 2006. The show started in April 2006. NHK recognized that this contributed to the popularity of the shirts. Even on the TBS network, the main newscaster, Tetsuya Chikushi, wore a kariyushi shirt in the summer of 2004 and 2005 on his news show "Tetsuya Chikushi NEWS23".

In June 2009, all members of the Japanese government who attended the cabinet meeting wore a shirt as part of the Cool Biz campaign. The Liberal Democratic Party also wore the shirts, but Hiroyuki Hosoda wore his shirt tucked into his pants which was said to have annoyed Yuriko Koike throughout the entire meeting. The kariyushi shirt is worn outside of the pants, and never tucked into the pants.

Following the Fukushima nuclear accident in 2011, Japan faced a shortage of power. Utility companies and the Japanese government promoted lower power usage during the summer, to help reduce consumption by 15 percent. This campaign was known as Setsuden, and office workers during this time switched their suits for the cooler kariyushi shirt.

== Design ==
Kariyushi shirts manufactured in Okinawa for local Okinawan residents are usually adorned with characteristic Okinawan designs found in traditional Okinawan arts, shisa temple guardian designs, and simple floral patterns in muted colors. They are often used to promote tourism in Okinawa, and have been established in replacing the standard white shirt and tie for Okinawan office workers during the summer. In 2005, the Cool Biz campaign prompted members of the Okinawan cabinet, mostly in central government, to wear the shirt during work hours.

Kariyushi shirts were created based on the Aloha shirt, generally designed with short sleeves and an open collar. They usually have buttons, sometimes as a complete button-down shirt, and sometimes just down to the chest (pullover). Kariyushi shirts usually have a left chest pocket sewn in, often with attention to ensure the printed pattern remains continuous. The shirts are cut short so that they can hang comfortably outside the pants. Patterns on the shirt use motifs from scenery characteristic to Okinawa such as bitter melons, hirami lemons, and Okinawan dragon boats.

The price of the shirts can vary from a few thousand yen for cheaper versions to several tens of thousands of yen for high-grade shirts made from musa basjoo "Japanese fiber banana", similar to Hawaiian tapa cloth.

Many variations of the shirt debuted from 2000. Shirts with longer sleeves were designed for women who were concerned with sunburn, and formal designs made from black fabrics for ceremonial events were sold.

Currently, wearing kariyushi shirts is promoted during the period of April to November. During this period, a large percentage of local government personnel wear the kariyushi shirt. In September 1999, the Okinawa parliamentary body gave permission for members to wear the shirt inside the parliamentary chambers. A number of these members currently wear the shirt and progress is being made for the local assembly to wear the shirts. Post office workers and Japan Transocean Air have their own characteristic shirt which they wear in the summer as part of their uniform. Even members at branch offices belonging to Okinawan companies located outside of Okinawa wear the shirt on "casual Friday".

== Branding ==
The term "Kariyushi shirt" was a registered trademark of Okinawa Industrial Federation but the right was transferred to the Okinawa Apparel Sewing Industrial Association. The rules of the authorization are as follows:

1. The shirts must be manufactured within the prefecture of Okinawa (fabric produced outside of the prefecture can be used to make the shirts).
2. Only patterns that promote tourism in Okinawa can be used.
