= Oplegnathus peaolopesi =

Scientific classification
- Domain: Eukaryota
- Kingdom: Animalia
- Phylum: Chordata
- Class: Actinopterygii
- Order: Centrarchiformes
- Family: Oplegnathidae
- Genus: Oplegnathus
- Species: O. peaolopesi

Binomial name
- Oplegnathus peaolopesi Smith, 1947

Species of ray-finned fish

Oplegnathus peaolopesi, the Mozambique knifejaw, is a ray-finned fish that occurs northwards from Sodwana Bay. It is a rare species.
