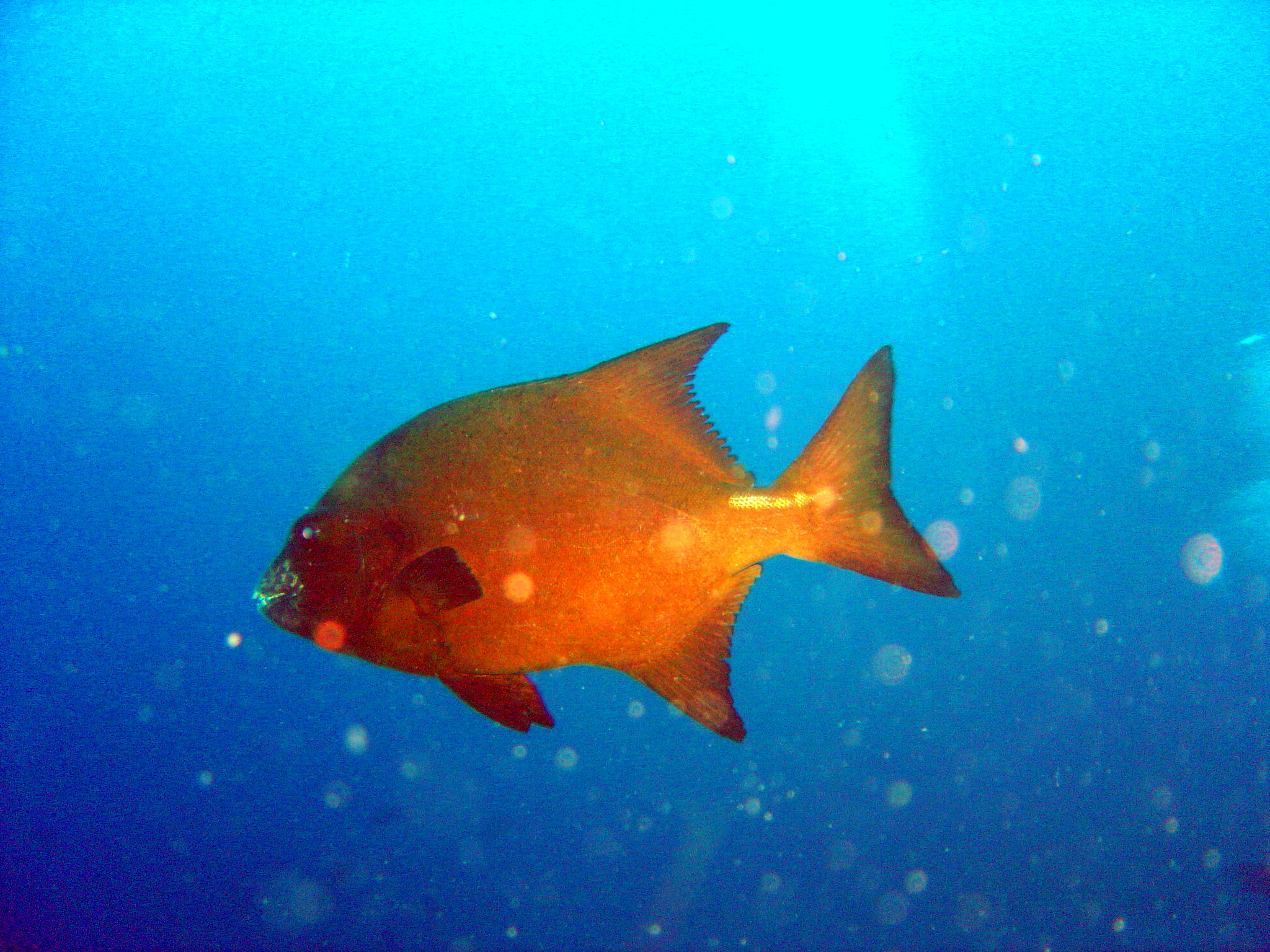

Scientific classification
- Kingdom: Animalia
- Phylum: Chordata
- Class: Actinopterygii
- Order: Centrarchiformes
- Family: Oplegnathidae
- Genus: Oplegnathus
- Species: O. robinsoni

Binomial name
- Oplegnathus robinsoni Richardson, 1840

= Oplegnathus robinsoni =

Species of ray-finned fish

Oplegnathus robinsoni, the Natal knifejaw, or also commonly known as Cuckoo Bass and Natalse Kraaibek, is a ray-finned fish that is endemic to the east coast of South Africa and Mozambique. They occur northwards from Transkei.

== Appearance ==
The fish is grey-brown to dark brown color and may be mottled. Juveniles, on the other hand, are yellow in color with several vertical black stripes along the body from the eye to tail. A parrot-like beak and teeth that are a part of the mouth allow it to tear organisms off of surfaces. The Natal knifejaw has a compressed body, with a high second dorsal fin.

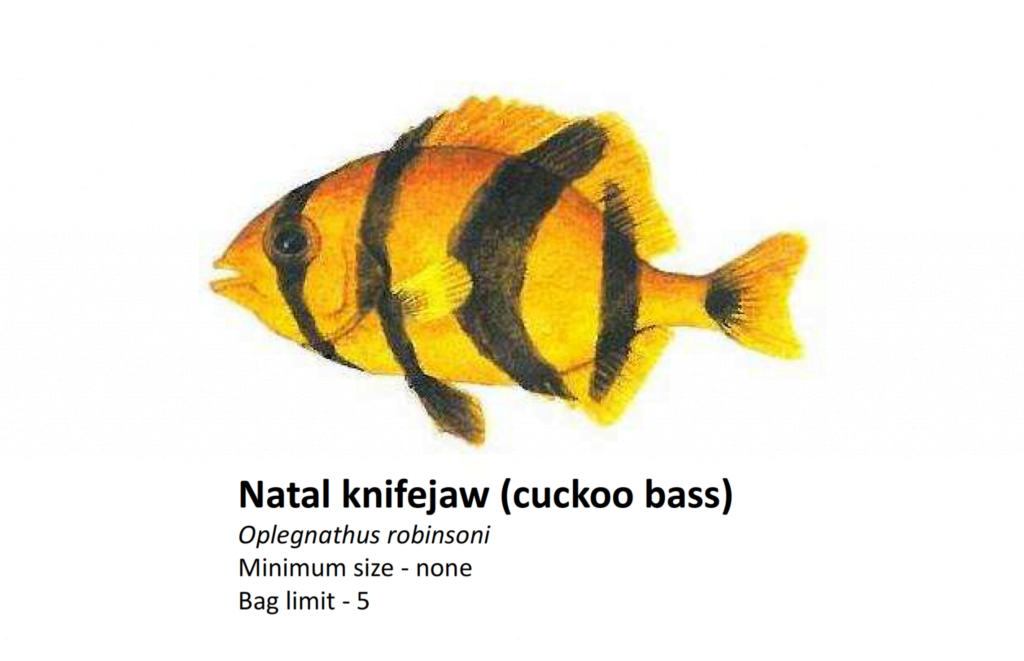
Juvenile Natal Knifejaw

== Age and Growth ==
The fish can grow up to 60 cm long and weigh up to 3 kg. While there is little information about the growth of Natal knifejaws, its family member, Oplegnathus conwayi, also known as the Cape knifejaw, has been studied to analyze their age. To conduct this study, researchers were able to use the otoliths (ear bones) of the fish to estimate their age. They did this by transversely cutting the otoliths to analyze the bones' growth rings. This study also improved the accuracy and consistency of estimating fish age using otoliths.

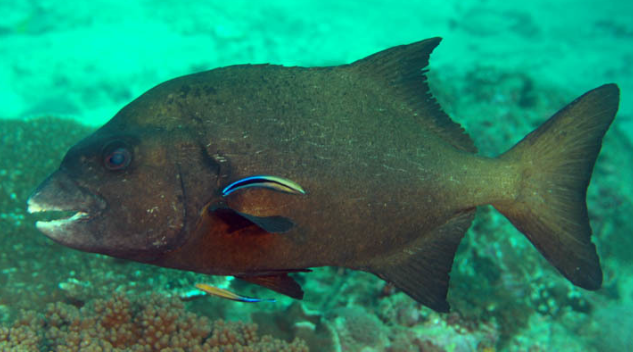
Adult Natal Knifejaw

== Diet ==
A Natal knifejaws' diet includes ascidians (sea squirts), soft coral, and reef-encrusting organisms. They have also been observed to feed carnivorously, preying on organisms including small fish, crustaceans, and cephalopods. With their parrot-like beak, the fish are able to tear organisms off of the coral and break through the shells of crustaceans.

== Distribution ==
The Natal knifejaw is an endemic species, mainly from southern Mozambique and the KwaZulu-Natal waters. They are common in the Pondoland Marine Protected Area (MPA) in the Eastern Cape of South Africa. Juveniles have been seen as far south as Tsitsikamma in the southern tip of South Africa.

Research showed that before the Last Glacial Maximum (LGM), the habitats of the fish extended to Cape Horn in South America, the Cape of Good Hope in Africa, and the Great Australian Bight in southern Oceania. Now, the Natal knifejaw's habitat is only concentrated on the south coast of Africa and it suggests that their current distribution is largely affected by environmental factors. These environmental factors include primary production, concentration of iron, and light. The small area of distribution suggests that the Natal knifejaws did not adjust well to their environment after the LGM and only inhabit the southeast coast of Africa.

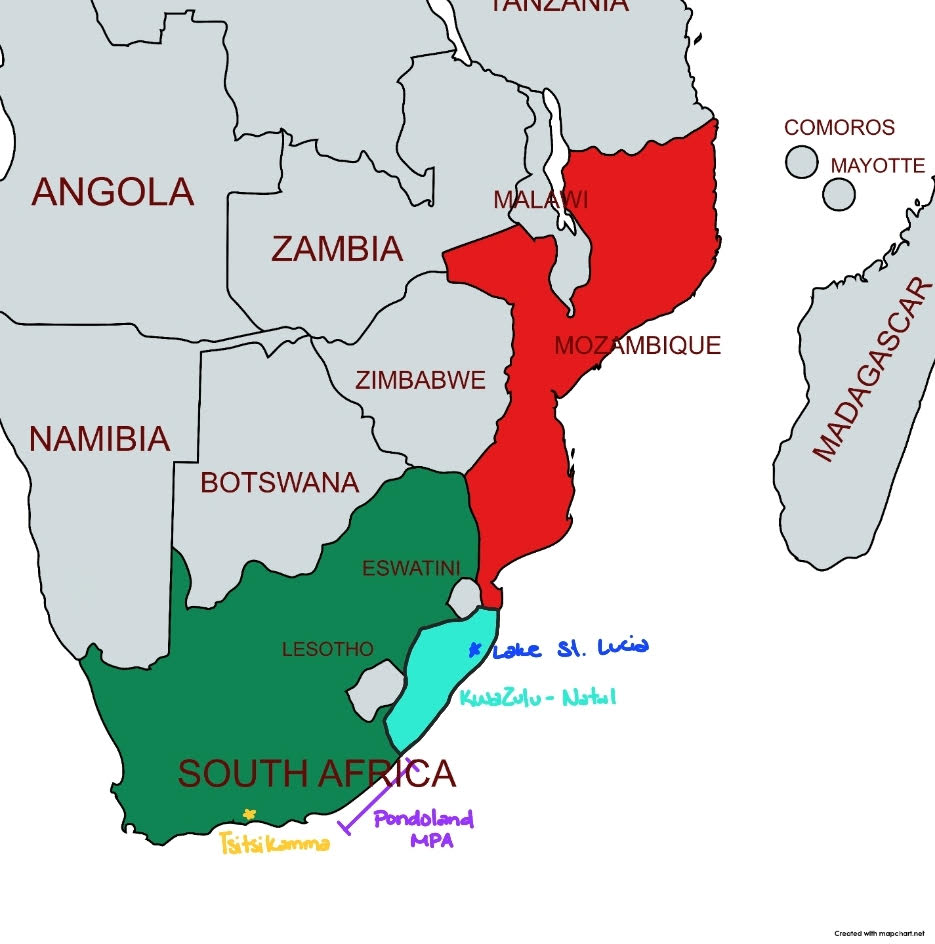
Natal Knifejaw Distribution

== Habitat and habits ==
Adult Natal knifejaws are found on inshore coral and in rocky reefs near the coast. Small yellow and black juveniles typically reside in pelagic currents. They are commonly found under floating objects at sea, while the larger juveniles occupy shallow subtidal reefs. They are also abundant in Lake St. Lucia, located near the eat coast of South Africa.

== History ==
There is fossil evidence showing that the family, Oplegnathidae, inhabited the northern part of Seymour Island in Antarctica. This shows that the Oplegnathidae inhabited the cold arctic waters before they were dispersed to warmer areas in South America, Africa, and Oceania, before they concentrated in Africa. This suggests that the Oplegnathidae were poor adapters to water temperature and moved around many times before settling.

== Reproduction ==
Unlike some fishes that reach maturity at a certain age, the Natal knifejaw reaches maturity at the length of 36 cm. Knifejaws spawn, like most fishes, and this takes place during the summer (October to January). Despite a lack of data, it is thought to occur throughout their distribution range.

Although the specific reproductive process is unknown in the Natal knifejaw, its family member, Oplegnathus punctatus, also known as the Spotted knifejaw, was studies and results showed that on spawning days, the water temperature was warmer, 21.1°C to 24.6°C, when the average temperatures ranged from 18.8°C to 29.6°C. The results of this study can be applied to the Natal knifejaw as the waters in Africa are on the warmer side. This can also be connected with the different locations that the knifejaw inhabited before settling into Africa.

== Conservation status ==
The current status of the Natal knifejaw is unknown, as no stock has been assessed recently. However, there are fishing regulations with this fish; a 5-per person limit per day to conserve the species. The lack of stock assessments has contributed to the limited amount of information and a species-specific regulation of the fish.

The beak-like shape of the Natal knifejaw's mouth makes them difficult to catch using a traditional rod and line. Because of this, spears are used to catch the fish. Due to the damage induced by the spears and the large amount of specimens required for collection, data is lacking for the Natal knifejaw.
