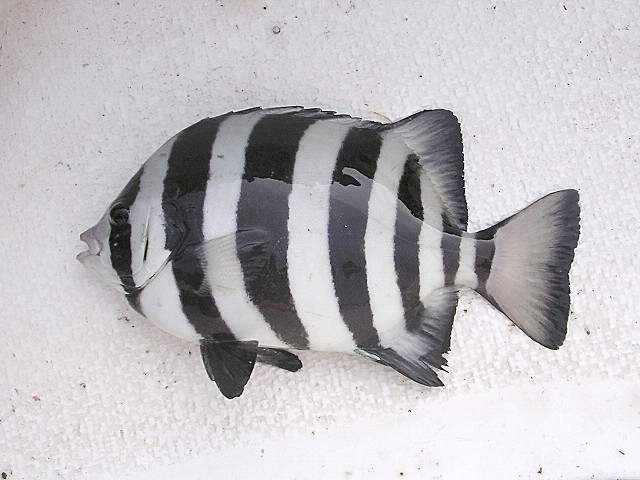
- O. fasciatus

Scientific classification
- Kingdom: Animalia
- Phylum: Chordata
- Class: Actinopterygii
- Order: Centrarchiformes
- Suborder: Terapontoidei
- Family: Oplegnathidae; Bleeker, 1853
- Genus: Oplegnathus; J. Richardson, 1840

Type species
- Oplegnathus conwaii J. Richardson, 1840

Synonyms
- Scaradon Temminck & Schlegel, 1844; Ichthyorhamphos Castelnau, 1861; Scarostoma Kner, 1867

= Oplegnathus =

Oplegnathus Temporal range: Middle Eocene–present

Genus of ray-finned fishes

Oplegnathus is currently the sole recognized genus in the knifejaw family (Oplegnathidae) of marine centrarchiform ray-finned fishes. The largest, the Cape knifejaw, can reach a maximum length around 90 cm (35 in). Knifejaws have teeth fused into a parrot-like beak in adulthood. They feed on barnacles and mollusks, and are fished commercially. They are native to the Indian and Pacific Oceans.

The earliest records of knifejaws are fossilized beaks, with attached teeth, known from middle Eocene-aged sediments of the La Meseta Formation of Antarctica. Their early occurrence in Antarctica supports it having temperate climate during the Eocene, and that knifejaws had a wider distribution in the past than today.

== Species ==
The currently recognized species in this genus are:

| Species | Common name | Image |
|---|---|---|
| Oplegnathus conwayi J. Richardson, 1840, 1840 | Cape knifejaw | |
| Oplegnathus fasciatus (Temminck & Schlegel, 1844) | barred knifejaw | |
| Oplegnathus insignis (Kner, 1867) | Pacific knifejaw | |
| Oplegnathus peaolopesi J. L. B. Smith, 1947 | Mozambique knifejaw | |
| Oplegnathus punctatus (Temminck & Schlegel, 1844) | spotted knifejaw | |
| Oplegnathus robinsoni Regan, 1916 | Natal knifejaw | |
| Oplegnathus woodwardi Waite, 1900 | | |
