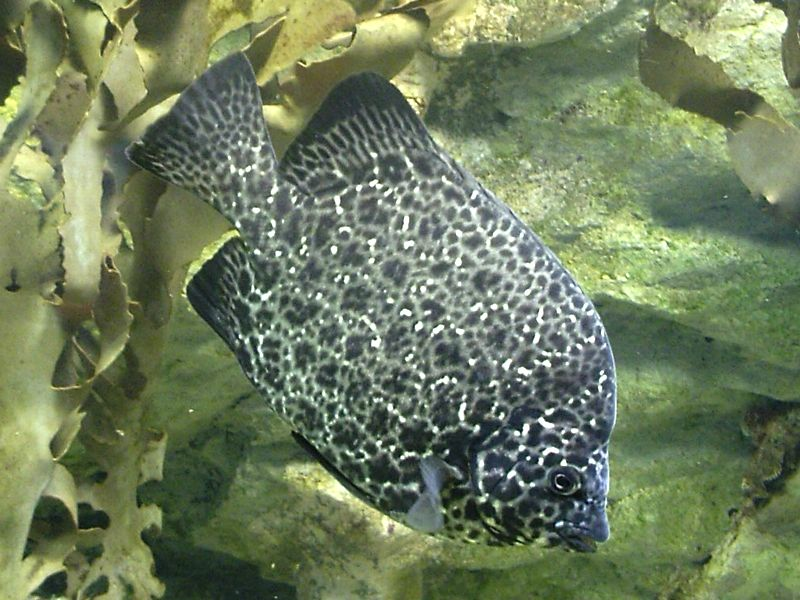

Scientific classification
- Kingdom: Animalia
- Phylum: Chordata
- Class: Actinopterygii
- Division: Teleostei
- Order: Centrarchiformes
- Family: Oplegnathidae
- Genus: Oplegnathus
- Species: O. punctatus

Binomial name
- Oplegnathus punctatus (Temminck & Schlege, 1844)

= Oplegnathus punctatus =

Species of ray-finned fish

Oplegnathus punctatus, commonly known as the spotted knifejaw, is one of seven species in the Oplegnathidae family of knifejaws. These perciform fish, an order of ray-finned fish that are "perch-like", characteristically have teeth fused into a parrot-like beak during adulthood. They diagnostically have a single dorsal fin and body covered in small scales that are known as ctenoid scales. Knifejaws are typically distributed in the Indian and Western Pacific Ocean, near southern parts of the Korean Peninsula, Taiwan, China, Japan, and Hawaii.

== Physical morphology ==
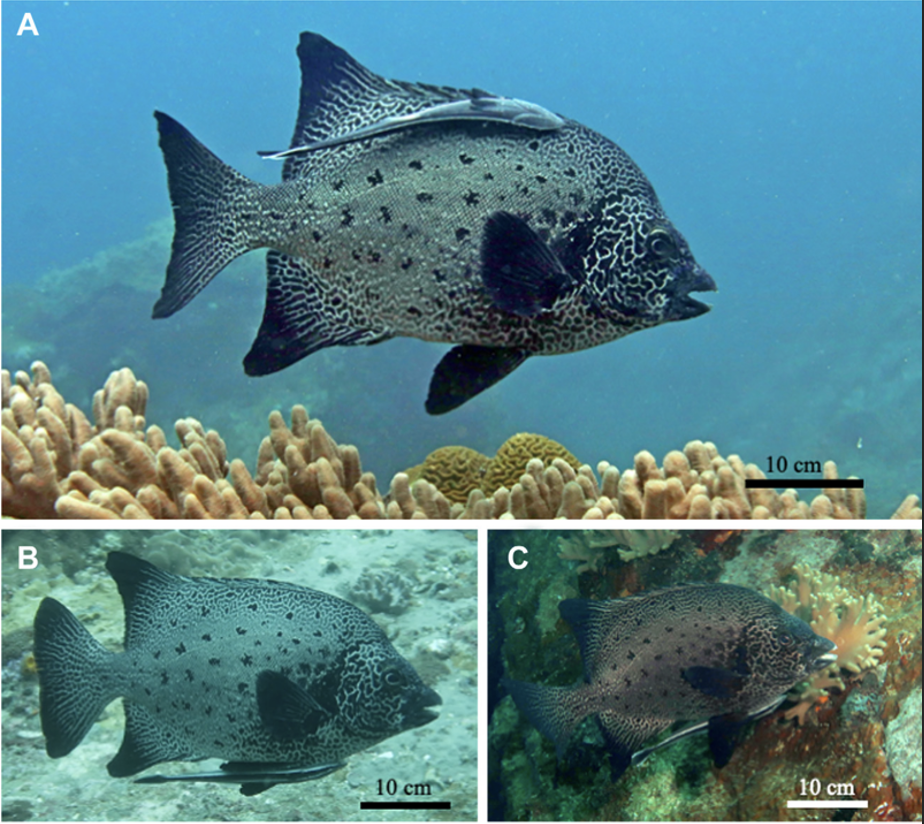
O. punctatus in Pulau Tengool waters. A. In a water column. B. On bare rock. C. On soft coral.

Oplegnathus punctatus, has a black-brown body surrounded in irregular black spots. Their average body size being around 51 mm (2 in), the largest being 0.61 m (2 ft) in total length with 0.46 m (1.5 ft) fork length. With their fusion of a beak-like tooth, there is a continuous series of arrow-shaped dental units that are surrounded by bone. They can move from the base towards the edge as time goes on. Early on, the teeth begin to form a thick layer of enamel that protects the tooth from sustaining damage easily. Their upper and lower jaws are fused into the jawbone, any dental gaps they have are filled with calcium. Their ctenoid scales are composed of a small rigid plate that grows out of their skin where the spines separate from the main body of the scale itself.

== Diet ==
The fused teeth resembling a beak, enable the spotted knifejaw to prey on hard-shelled organisms such as clams, sea urchins, and oysters. Though there is limited research on specifics regarding dietary habits of the spotted knifejaw, past studies were known to suggest that they were primarily carnivorous fish due to their unique teeth structure. In depth research conducted to find stomach contents of spotted knifejaws, resulted in having large amounts of aquatic algae in the intestinal contents of all specimens collected. The experiment included seaweed, oysters, as well as a strong inclination to plant bait. That same study also seemingly concluded that spotted knifejaws at different stages of growth seemed to prefer a certain type of diet over the other. Juveniles tend to focus more on seaweed as well as zooplankton while adults tend to veer off into larger prey. They had high preferences for cnidarians, chordates, as well as arthropods. Given that their geographic distribution is a vast, their prey preference tends to mirror the different aquatic environments they are in with a correlation in crustaceans and zooplankton as well as phytoplankton. More research is needed in those separate aquatic environments to distinguish between one another and have a more concrete dietary evolution specific to a region of Spotted knifejaws. More recent studies have attempted to dive deeper into the possibility of them being omnivorous fish by way of multi-omics.

== Geographic distribution ==
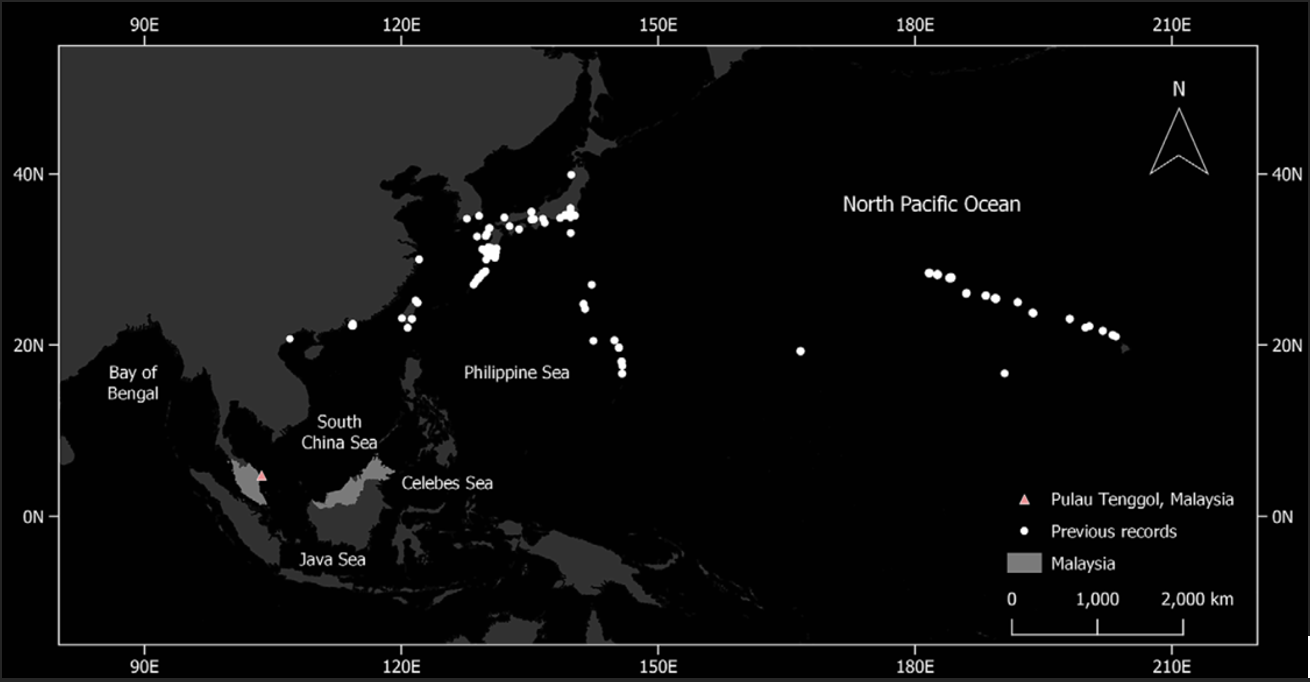
Distribution of O. punctatus in the Northern Pacific relative to open ocean and new records in the southern South China Sea in Malaysia.

Spotted knifejaws are members belonging to the middle and lower strata of the temperate and tropical/subtropical coastal fishes. Their preference being to live in more rocky or coral reef waters. Juveniles tend to circle water near drifting seaweed. Water depth ranging in 10–100 m (33–328 ft), which qualify as being in dark states for prolonged periods of time due to the absorption of light by water. Prevalent in the cool Northwestern water of Hawaiʻi, the spotted knifejaws have been reported to reach up to 710 mm (28 in) in length. More popularly found near Kaua'i and Niihau but can also be seen in the Main Hawaiian Islands. They are also commonly distributed in the South China Sea, East China Sea, and Yellow Sea. From November to March of each year, there is water flowing along the Vietnam coast approaching the Peninsular Malaysia centering at 5°N, at a location where there is cold-water inflow making it a suitable rocky habitat and plenty of drifting seaweed for juveniles to attach to.

== Reproduction ==
Mature female spotted knifejaws can spawn several times on sandy/gravel bottoms seasonally from April to July. A lot of rearing of this fish tends to be done in land-based aquaculture systems that are in possession of heating equipment due to the low seawater temperatures on China's northern coasts, and it is indicated that optimal growth is stunted when there is a water temperature below 15°C. The spotted knifejaws optimal growth temperature ranges from 25°C and 30°C. There have been numerous studies focusing on the developmental biology and potential artificial breeding techniques that include taxonomy, ecology, and historical observation of organs while in the early developmental stages. Due to advances in artificial breeding technology for the spotted knifejaw, the breeding scale has begun to expand. To this date, breeding modes of this fish in the northern Yellow and Bohai Sea areas in China that have been included a majority of the time in recirculating aquaculture systems and aquaculture net pens.

== Conservation status ==
At the moment, there is no conservation status listed on IUCN Red List or anywhere else regarding the spotted knifejaw. However, there are continuous efforts to expand aquaculture regarding this fish and finding ways to eradicate bacteria/diseases within this fish that it has become prone to attracting making it a danger for human consumption. There has been an increase in pathogenic diseases due to expanding cultures and since there is very little known about the immune system within a spotted knifejaw, there are some limitations on the availability of environmentally friendly strategies for disease prevention.

== Human consumption ==
The spotted knifejaw is popular due to its rapid growth, succulent flesh, and taste. It is considered a superior raw material in sashimi and favored by high-end seafood restaurants. There are also medicinal and ornamental uses for this fish. In China, the spotted knifejaw goes for around 200 RMB per kilogram sold. There is high value in industrial recirculation of aquaculture systems and become the poster fish for stock enhancement and release in marine ranching. However, Ciguatera fish poisoning is a fairly big issue due to it being recognized as the most frequent seafood poisoning from the consumption of fish containing principal toxins also known as ciguatoxins. There have been several reported outbreaks due to the consumption of this fish caught from the Mainland around the Pacific coast and they were often caused by mature spotted knifejaws.

Megalocytivirus is emerging as another major viral pathogen in aquaculture. This had led to substantial economic losses due to its wide range of effects. The spotted knifejaw happens to be the most susceptible fish to this pathogen. Amongst all the other susceptible hosts, spotted knifejaws have demonstrated an extremely high mortality rate that could reach up to 90%.
