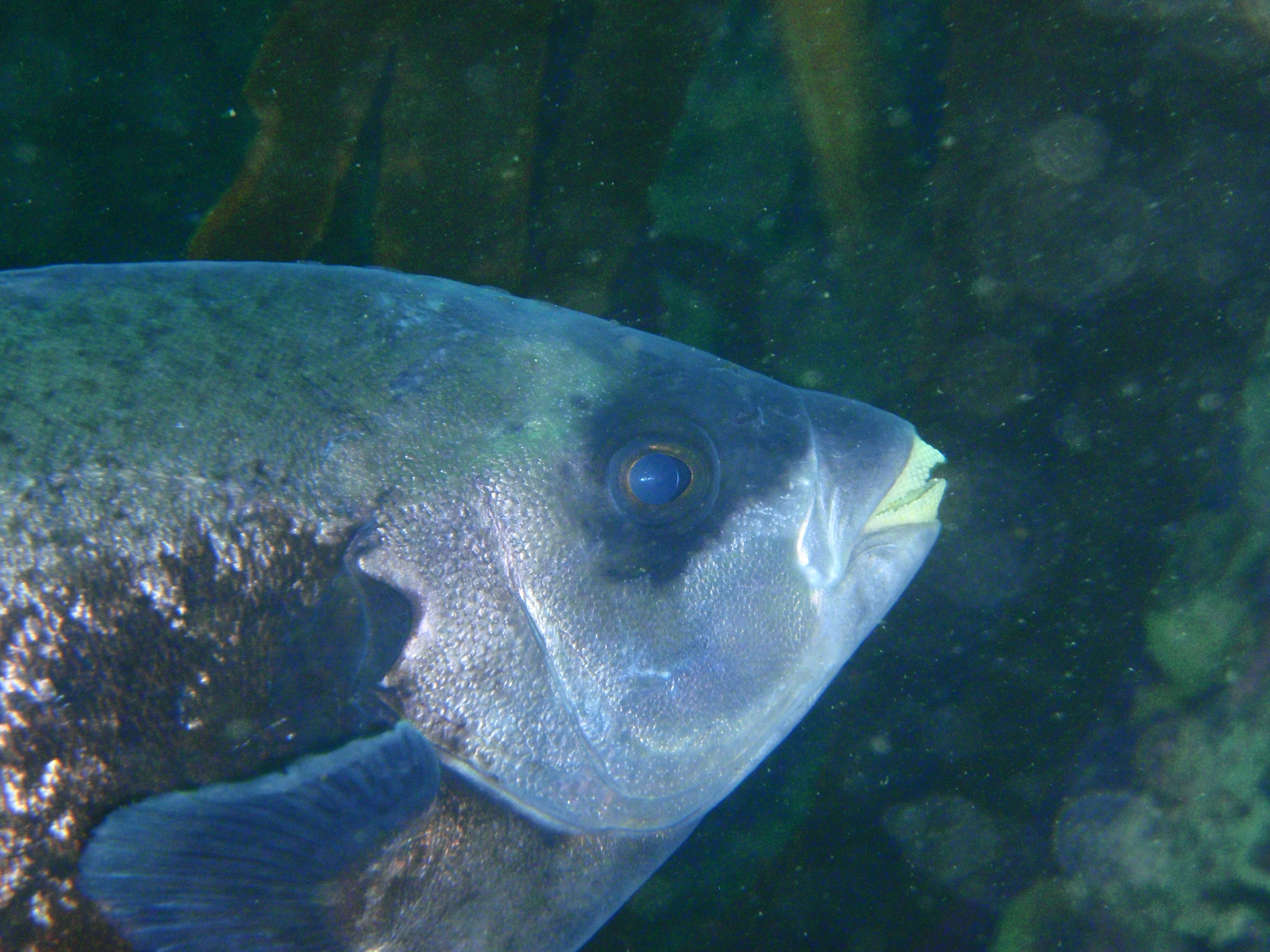

Scientific classification
- Domain: Eukaryota
- Kingdom: Animalia
- Phylum: Chordata
- Class: Actinopterygii
- Order: Centrarchiformes
- Family: Oplegnathidae
- Genus: Oplegnathus
- Species: O. conwayi

Binomial name
- Oplegnathus conwayi Richardson, 1840

= Oplegnathus conwayi =

Species of ray-finned fish

Oplegnathus conwayi, the Cape knifejaw, is an endemic ray-finned fish that only occurs between Table Bay and the Aliwal Bank on the South African coast.
