= Hideaki Akaiwa =

Japanese doctor

- Born: c. 1968; Ishinomaki, Miyagi prefecture, Japan
- Occupation: Doctor
- Known for: saving his wife, mother and searching for survivors during the 2011 Tōhoku earthquake and tsunami
- Spouse: Hiroko Akaiwa (m. 1991)

Hideaki Akaiwa (Akaiwa Hideaki; born 1968) (in Ishinomaki, Miyagi prefecture, Japan) is a Japanese doctor who was recognized as a hero for his actions in the aftermath of the 2011 Tōhoku earthquake and tsunami.

== Overview ==
Akaiwa was at work when the earthquake struck at 2:46 p.m. on March 11, and rushed home to find his neighborhood flooded with up to 10 feet of water. Akaiwa retrieved a wetsuit, swam nearly 200 metres (660 ft), waded his way through the debris and underwater hazards and reached his house. The house was flooded up to 3 metres (9.8 ft), he found his wife Hiroko Akaiwa on the upper floor with a little air left. Akaiwa succeeded in rescuing his wife of two decades on March 12, the following day. He said "the water felt very cold, dark and scary," "It was quite difficult with all the floating wreckage." Southeast Asia Bureau reporter Rick Westhead asked why he risked his life to save his wife, he answered via his interpreter "She is very important for me".

With his mother still unaccounted for, Akaiwa repeatedly searched for her at City Hall and nearby evacuation centers. Akaiwa made full use of his diving skills. He waded through neck-deep water, searching the neighborhood where she had last been seen. Finally, on March 15, based on sightings he found her on the second floor of a flooded house where she had been waiting for help for four days. Akaiwa said "She was very much panicking", "There were rushing waters all around still and she was trapped in the upper part of her house."

After rescuing his wife and mother he continued to look for more survivors a week after the massive earthquake and tsunami hit Ishinomaki, for which he was a subject of international press attention and was profiled at the popular website "Badass of the Week" on March 18, 2011.

On September 9, 2018, in Higashimatsushima (Miyagi Prefecture), Hamaichi Point (浜市ポイント), Akaiwa participated in the 5th Carlsbad Open 2018 tournament and earned 3rd place in the Surfing Senior Men Class.
