= Metropolitan Tokyo Ordinance on Measures for Stranded Individuals =

The Metropolitan Tokyo Ordinance on Measures for Stranded Persons (東京都帰宅困難者対策条例, Tōkyōto kitaku kon'nansha taisaku jōrei) is a city ordinance that requires businesses to prepare for a disaster in the Tokyo metropolitan area by stockpiling various emergency supplies at their places of business. It requires them to keep three days' supplies on hand so that commuters, particularly those who live far away, will not be forced by circumstances to walk home long distances in the event that the transportation systems are disrupted.

Drafted in the aftermath of the 2011 Tōhoku earthquake and tsunami, it was passed on March 30, 2012 and came into effect on April 1, 2013.
