= Setsuden =

Setsuden (Japanese: 節電, lit. “saving electricity” in English) was a national movement in Japan to encourage the Japanese public to conserve electricity during the 2011 summer months, and adopt an overall energy sustainable lifestyle. The movement started in July 2011 to prevent rolling blackouts during the summer due to electricity shortages in eastern Japan. Specifically, setsuden was largely in reaction to the aftermath of March 2011 when the Fukushima nuclear plant faced a meltdown after it was damaged by the Tōhoku earthquake and tsunami. Following the shutdown of the Fukushima power plant, other nuclear plants were also decommissioned indefinitely for maintenance checks, further reducing the nation's nuclear power supply. In response to this energy shortage, media campaigns promoted Japanese households and businesses to cut back on electrical usage. While the movement started as an unofficial one, on July 1, 2011, the government passed energy-restriction policies for large companies and target reductions for households and smaller businesses. Although these restrictions were repealed in September 2011, the movement has been successful in preventing blackouts for its span.

== Origin ==
Nuclear power plants originally supplied around 30% of energy around Japan before the March 11 Tōhoku earthquake and tsunami damaged the Fukushima Daiichi nuclear plant and prompted safety checks of other power plants. Including the Fukushima plant, most of the nuclear reactors shut down were owned by Tokyo Electric Power Company(TEPCO), one of Japan's major energy suppliers and leading sources of nuclear power The March earthquake, combined with a meltdown of the Fukushima plant caused the initial widespread blackouts in affected parts of Japan; since then, TEPCO has not recovered and estimated it would be unable to provide enough electricity to meet the peak demand of the 2011 summer.

The damage from the earthquake to the Fukushima Daiichi reactor prompted stress tests of the nation's other fifty-four nuclear reactors; the tests were meant to inspect the resilience of the other reactors in case of another earthquake or tsunami. All of the reactors decommissioned for stress tests and safety checks were yet to be reactivated for usage; as of January 2012, only five were still in action. The absence of these reactors further complicated the energy shortages in eastern parts of Japan.

== Support and response ==
=== Publicity ===
Awareness of the need to save electricity has been raised through public and media support. Public networks aired television advertisements for setsuden and posters were posted around places such as temples and convenience stores. Companies such as Panasonic also provided energy saving information and lectures for employees to review online. The movement has been supported by Japan's prime minister Naoto Kan, made public statements about developing alternative energy sources in solar and wind power.

==== Private households ====
Conservation efforts by the public households were voluntary, but were highly encouraged by the media and government. For the summer of 2011, Tokyo Electric Power Company posted a page with energy suggestions mainly stating that air conditioner use should be decreased as much as possible, and that appliances should be cleaned to operate optimally. Other methods to save electricity are listed below:

- turning lights off during the daytime and when not in use, and replacing incandescent bulbs with fluorescent or LED bulbs
- unplugging electric toilets and turning off lights when not in use
- growing curtains of plants to block and absorb sunlight passing through windows
- completely shutting off appliances instead of putting them on standby mode
- using paper fans instead of air conditioners, which account for a large amount of electrical consumption

==== Business and corporate sector ====
As of July 2011, buildings with electrical usage exceeding 500 kilowatts at any time were mandated to reduce electricity usage by 15%, while leading companies were asked to reduce usage up to 30% These laws are based on Electricity Business Law's Article 27 and fines for exceeding usage or not meeting target electrical savings could cost the company up to 1 million yen. These restrictions were in place for three months, ending in September 2011, although some companies are still using electricity saving methods. Aside from installing private generators, to reduce energy usage, companies in part depended on employee participation and cooperation.

- Households and businesses were told to stay less than 26 °C(82.4 °F) to limit air conditioner usage. Workers were instead been encouraged to participate in the Super Cool Biz campaign by wearing more weather appropriate clothing instead of formal business attire to cut down on heating and cooling costs. This resulted in a more casual dress code incorporating lighter, tie-free clothing in the summer; and heavier, warmer clothing in the winter.
- Many businesses changed their work schedules and shifted vacation days to distribute energy usage evenly across the week; the schedule change aimed to specifically avoid peak usage times on the weekdays from 1 P.M. to 4 P.M. Among participating companies, many Japanese car makers moved their working days to the weekend in exchange for days off during the weekday.
- Productivity and convenience was decreased in favor of energy conservation.

- Public transportation, such as bullet trains, ran slower.
- Escalators in stations were stopped and billboards were turned off when not displaying energy usage levels.
- Most display and exhibition lighting, in addition to unnecessary machinery, was turned off.

==== Manufacturer and retail ====
Manufacturing companies responded by putting out appliances and other products that are more power efficient or do not rely on electricity. Corona Corporation and Iwatani Corporation were two companies that increased their production of oil heaters to meet consumer demand. In addition, clothing companies and similar producers pushed for the purchase of hot patches and insulating clothing as alternatives to electric heating devices in preparation for winter weather.

Panasonic, Sharp, and other appliance manufacturers developed products meant to be twice as energy efficient as earlier models. Air conditioners, televisions, and other appliances produced under Panasonic's EcoNavi line will have sensors to detect when the machine is idle and have the machine shut down completely instead of being in standby mode.

== Success and Impact ==
Japan faced no power outages for the duration of the summer campaign, which was a relative success. Compared to last year, energy usage during peak hours fell around 20%, with max usage falling from 60 gigawatts to 49 gigawatts. The government energy restrictions were originally meant to end on September 22, but due to cooler weather conditions in August and less need for air conditioning, they were instead ended in the beginning of September ahead of schedule . There were no plans to place energy restrictions for the summer 2012.

== See also ==
- Nuclear power debate
- Anti-nuclear movement
