= Cool Biz campaign =

Japanese campaign to conserve electricity consumption

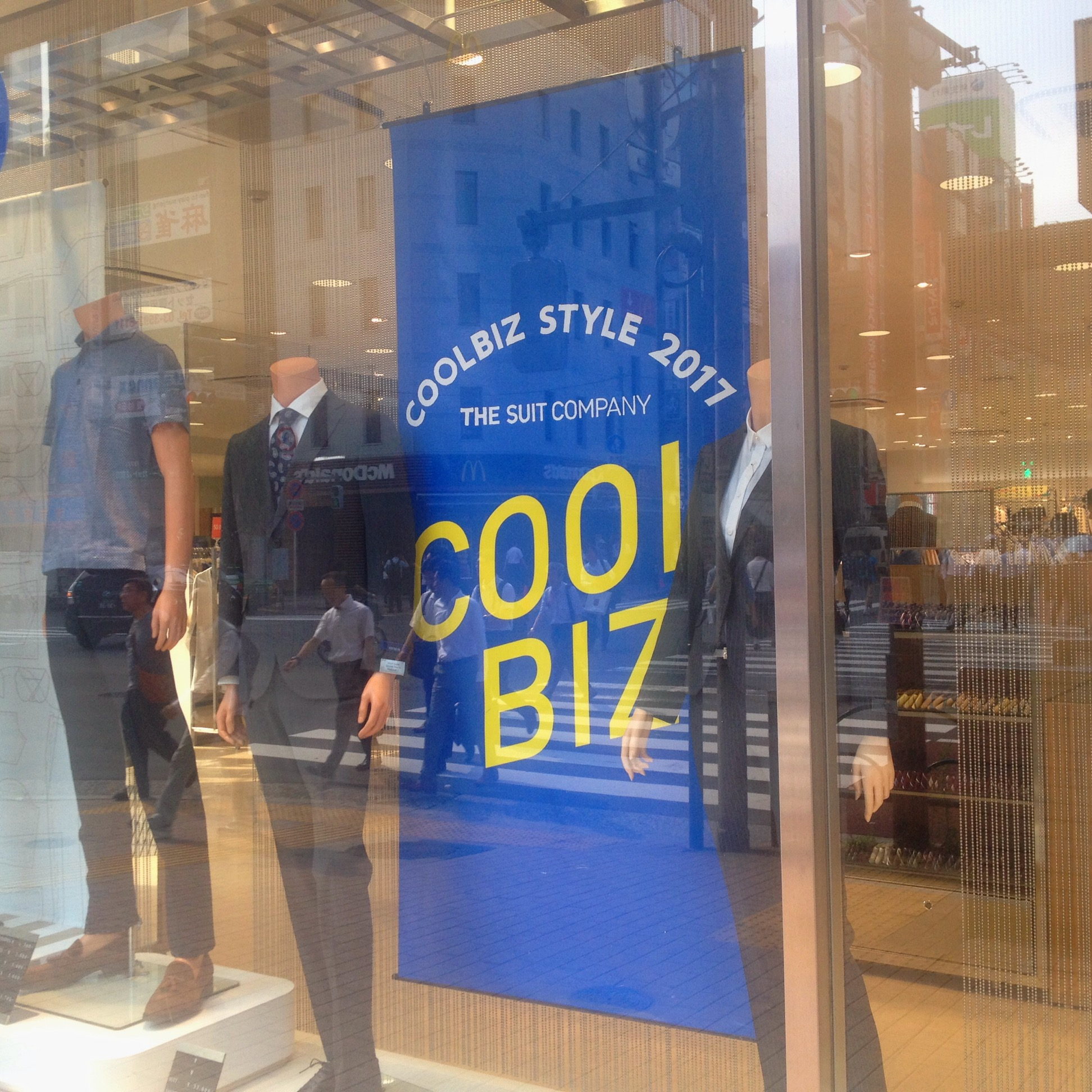
Shop display of Cool Biz fashions, 2017

The Cool Biz campaign is a Japanese campaign initiated by the Japanese Ministry of the Environment from mid-2005 as a means to help reduce Japanese electricity consumption by limiting the use of air conditioning. This was enabled by changing the standard office air conditioner temperature to 28 °C (82 °F) and introducing a liberal summer dress code in the bureaucracy of the Japanese government so staff could work in the warmer temperature. The campaign then spread to the private sector.

This idea was proposed by the then-Minister Yuriko Koike under the cabinet of Prime Minister Junichirō Koizumi. Initially the campaign was from June to September, but from 2011, when there were electricity shortages after the 2011 Tōhoku earthquake and tsunami it was lengthened. It now runs from May to October.

== Plan ==
According to the Ministry of the Environment, central government ministries were to set air conditioner temperatures at 28 °C until September. The Cool Biz dress code advises workers to starch collars so they stand up and to wear trousers made from materials that breathe and absorb moisture. Additionally, workers are encouraged to wear short-sleeved shirts without jackets or ties. Many workers, though, were confused about whether they should follow the new stipulations—many came to work with their jackets in hand and their ties in their pockets. Even those who liked the idea of dressing more casually sometimes became self-conscious during their commutes when they were surrounded by non-government employees who were all wearing standard business suits. Many government workers said they felt it was impolite not to wear a tie when meeting counterparts from the private sector.

All of the government leaders took part in Cool Biz. Prime Minister Koizumi was frequently interviewed without a tie or jacket, and this produced a significantly raised profile of the campaign.

== Result of Cool Biz Campaign ==
On October 28, 2005, the Ministry of Environment announced results of the Cool Biz campaign. The MOE conducted a web-based questionnaire survey on the Cool Biz campaign on September 30, 2005, covering some 1,200 men and women randomly extracted from an Internet panel recruited by a research company. Survey results indicate that 95.8% of respondents knew Cool Biz, and 32.7% of 562 respondents answered that their offices set the air conditioner thermostat higher than in previous years. Based on these figures, the Ministry estimated that the campaign resulted in a 460,000-ton reduction in CO_{2} emission, the equivalent volume of CO_{2} emitted by about 1 million households for one month.

Some companies including Toyota requested their employees not to wear jackets and ties even when meeting with business partners.

The results for 2006 were even better, resulting in an estimated 1.14 million-ton reduction in CO_{2} emission, equivalent to the CO_{2} emissions by about 2.5 million households for one month. The Ministry also stated that it intends to continue encouraging people to set summer office temperatures at no lower than 28 °C as well as to work to have the Cool Biz concept take permanent root in society.

In July 2009, the Cabinet Office announced results of a new questionnaire survey, which indicates that 91.8% of respondents knew about the Cool Biz campaign, and 57% of them put the campaign into practice.

== Economic results ==
On the other hand, the Ministry of Economy, Trade and Industry (METI) analyzed that the Cool Biz campaign increases replacement demand for clothing and generates positive macroeconomic effects on the GDP by 18 billion yen in summer 2005. Dai-Ichi Life Research Institute announced that the total economic effect was more than 100 billion yen in 2005.

== Warm Biz ==
During winter 2005, there was talk on many of the major news networks of promoting a "Warm Biz" style for winter, suggesting that people wear waistcoats, knit sweaters, and lap blankets. Warm Biz was not endorsed by the Japanese government at first. The food industry eagerly promoted this campaign by selling foods that warm people up, such as nabemono.

However, the electric utility industry had little enthusiasm for the campaign. Since fossil fuel heating is popular in northern Japan, Warm Biz had little effect on electric consumption. Thus, Warm Biz is more often referred in an environmental conservation context since fossil fuel heating releases more carbon dioxide than air conditioners do.

== Super Cool Biz ==
Following the Tōhoku earthquake and tsunami in March 2011, the shutdown of many nuclear power plants for safety reasons led to energy shortages. To conserve energy, the government recommended setting air conditioners at 28 degrees Celsius, switching off computers not in use, and called for shifting work hours to the morning and taking more summer vacation than usual. The government then launched a "Super Cool Biz" campaign to encourage workers to wear outfits appropriate for the office yet cool enough to endure the summer heat. Polo shirts and trainers were allowed, while jeans and sandals were also acceptable under certain circumstances. June 1 marked the start of the Ministry of the Environment's Super Cool Biz campaign, with "full-page newspaper ads and photos of ministry workers smiling rather self-consciously at their desks wearing polo shirts and colorful Okinawa kariyushi shirts." The campaign was repeated in 2012.

== Cool Biz outside Japan ==
The South Korean Ministry of Environment and the British Trades Union Congress have promoted their own Cool Biz campaigns since summer 2006. The concept also inspired the United Nations to launch the "Cool UN" initiative in 2008.

== 2026 Campaign ==
In April 2026 "Tokyo Cool Biz" was launched, encouraging employees to wear casual clothes including shorts to work. This caused a counter reaction by women, who are complaining about "leg hair harassment". On social media the term - "sunehara" was coined, referring to the discomfort of being exposed to their colleague's leg hair.

== See also ==
- Cool Japan
