= Seaside Aquarium =

Aquarium in Oregon, United States

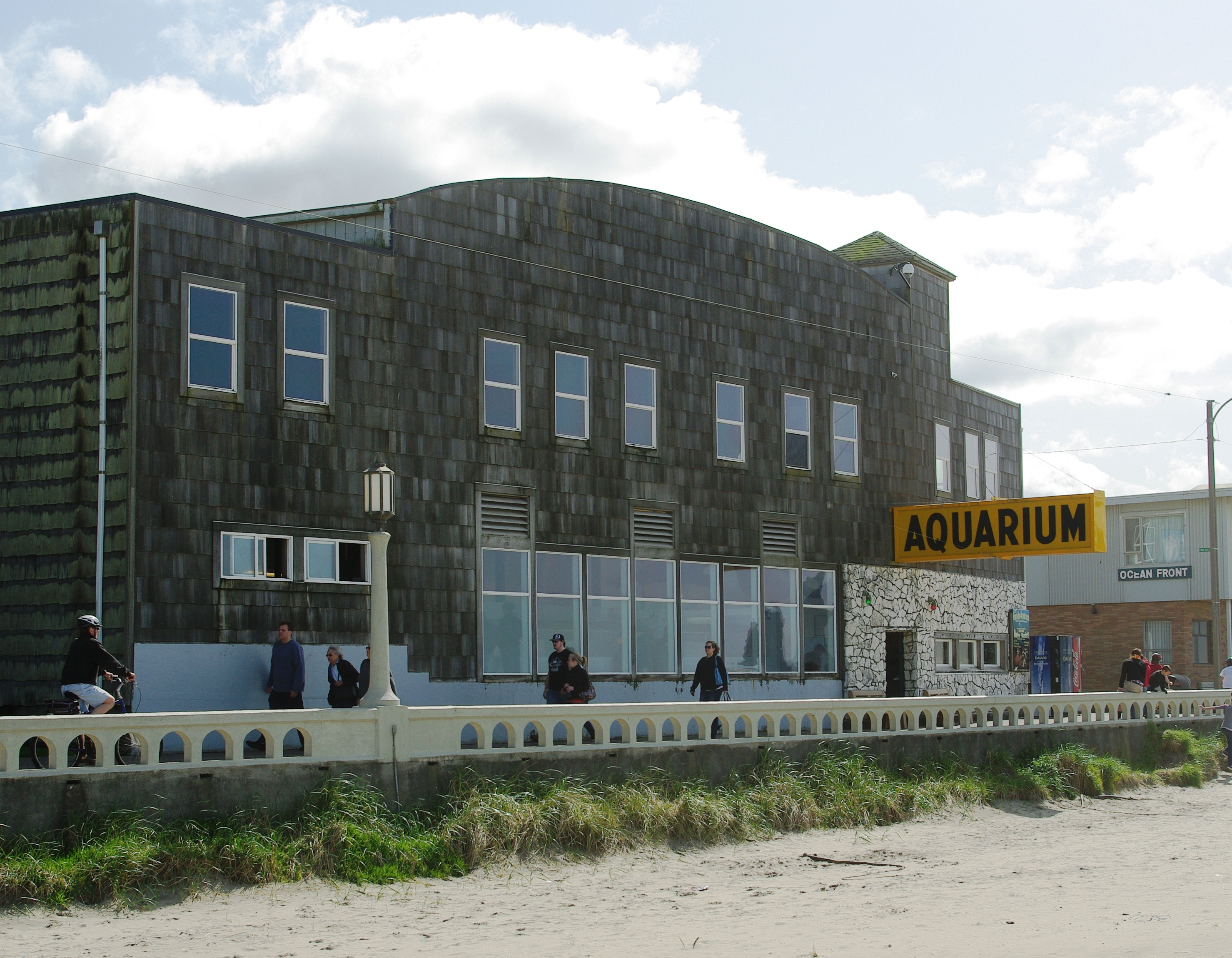
- Iconic sign of the aquarium overlooking Seaside's promenade.
- Interactive map of Seaside Aquarium
- 45.99526°N 123.92916°W
- Date opened: 1937
- Location: Seaside, Oregon, United States
- Website: seasideaquarium.com

The Seaside Aquarium is a privately owned aquarium in Seaside, Oregon, United States. It is one of the oldest aquariums on the West Coast.

== History ==
The building where the aquarium is located was built initially as a natatorium in the 1920s, an indoor saltwater public bath, with the water pumped from the Pacific Ocean through a pipe still visible today at the tide line, and then heated. It featured balconies where people could watch others swim in the pool below. A decade later, the Great Depression ended its economic feasibility. The building later served as a salmon rearing facility and then a place to watch wrestling matches. The aquarium was founded in 1937, making it one of the oldest in the United States. It uses the same pipe that was installed in the 1920s to fill the aquarium tanks.

== Features ==
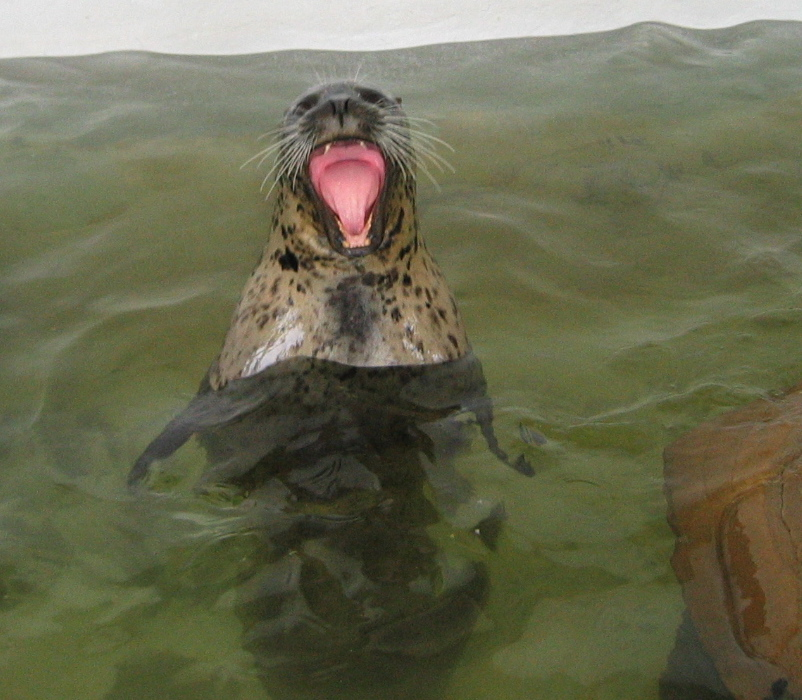
Seal at the aquarium

The Seaside Aquarium reports 100 species of marine life including 20-"arm" sea stars, crabs, wolf eels, moray eels, and octopuses. The Seaside Aquarium established the first program to breed harbor seals in captivity and allows visitors the chance to feed its seals.

During March 2013, a boat lost during the 2011 Tōhoku earthquake and tsunami drifted across the Pacific Ocean and washed up on the shores of Washington carrying trapped live fish. The sole remaining so-called tsunami fish was put on display at the Seaside Aquarium.
