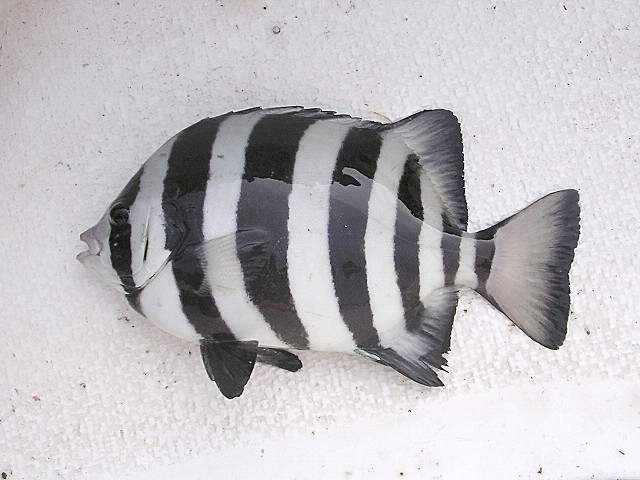

Conservation status
- Least Concern (IUCN 3.1)

Scientific classification
- Kingdom: Animalia
- Phylum: Chordata
- Class: Actinopterygii
- Division: Teleostei
- Order: Centrarchiformes
- Family: Oplegnathidae
- Genus: Oplegnathus
- Species: O. fasciatus

Binomial name
- Oplegnathus fasciatus (Temminck & Schlegel, 1844)

Synonyms
- Scaradon fasciatus Temminck & Schlegel, 1844

= Barred knifejaw =

Species of ray-finned fish

The barred knifejaw (Oplegnathus fasciatus), also known as the striped beakfish or rock bream, is a species of marine ray-finned fish, from the family Oplegnathidae. It is commonly native to the north-western Pacific Ocean, though a smattering of records exist from other localities in the eastern Pacific such as Hawaii and Chile. Recently introduced – likely via ballast water – in the central Mediterranean, it is found very rarely from Malta to the northern Adriatic. There is no listed conservation status for this species, though it is farmed for consumption and angling in many Asian countries suggesting it is common.

The barred knifejaw is an inhabitant of rocky reefs and occurs at depths from 1 to 10 m (3 to 33 ft). Juvenile members of this species can be found with patches of drifting seaweed. This species can reach a total length of 80 cm (31 in), with the greatest recorded weight for this species of 6.4 kg (14 lb). As with all members of the Oplegnathus family, the barred knifejaw has a beak-like structure formed by the fusion of its teeth. One of the biggest identifying characteristics of O. fasciatus is the 7 vertical black bars along both sides of its body, from which it derives its name. The first bar characteristically begins over the eye of the fish and the last is on the body’s narrowing towards the caudal peduncle. The end of the caudal fin is also typically black-tipped.

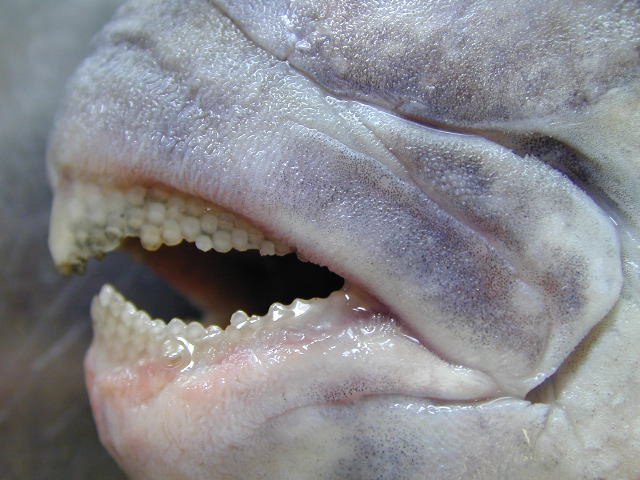
The beak of Oplegnathus woodwardi, a fish of the same genus.

Overall, the fish is easily identifiable due to the black stripes and otherwise solid white/grey body color, however large adult males have been observed with black snouts and no striping. The dorsal and anal fins are oriented posterior on the fish while the pectoral and pelvic fins are before the midline of the fish. Adults of the species utilize their beak-like mouth structure to effectively feed on hard-shelled invertebrates such as crustaceans and mollusks, while juveniles heavily depend on zooplankton. It is a commercially important species and is farmed throughout many East Asian countries for many aquaculture purposes including fishing, fish ranching, and genetic analysis and/or selective breeding of the fish to yield larger fish and therefore a better food source.

== Geographic distribution ==
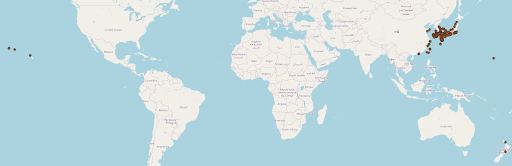
Distribution of the barred knifejaw from 1/1/2000 to present day via INaturalist. The Tsunami fish and subsequent sightings off the Pacific coast of the US are not documented through INaturalist.

The barred knifejaw is endemic to the western Pacific Ocean, notably around the Hawaiian Islands, Japan, and the Osawara Islands. Typically, knifejaw species are found along coastal reefs, though juvenile knifejaw are frequently found in areas with seaweed where their primary food source, zooplankton, is plentiful and the foliage provides cover. Typically, the fish reside as deep as 10 meters deep along reefs, debris, and other structures that can provide shelter and habitat for food sources such as mollusks and crustaceans.

Due to the 2011 tsunami in Japan, a large amount of debris was dumped throughout the Pacific Ocean. Of that debris, two fishing vessels washed up in Long Beach, Washington while harboring at least five specimens of O. fasciatus. Of those 5 fish, one remains as a museum exhibit in the Seaside Aquarium in Seaside, Oregon. Since then, scarce sightings of the barred knifejaw have been reported along Monterey County in California and Curry County in Oregon in 2015.

== Tsunami fish ==
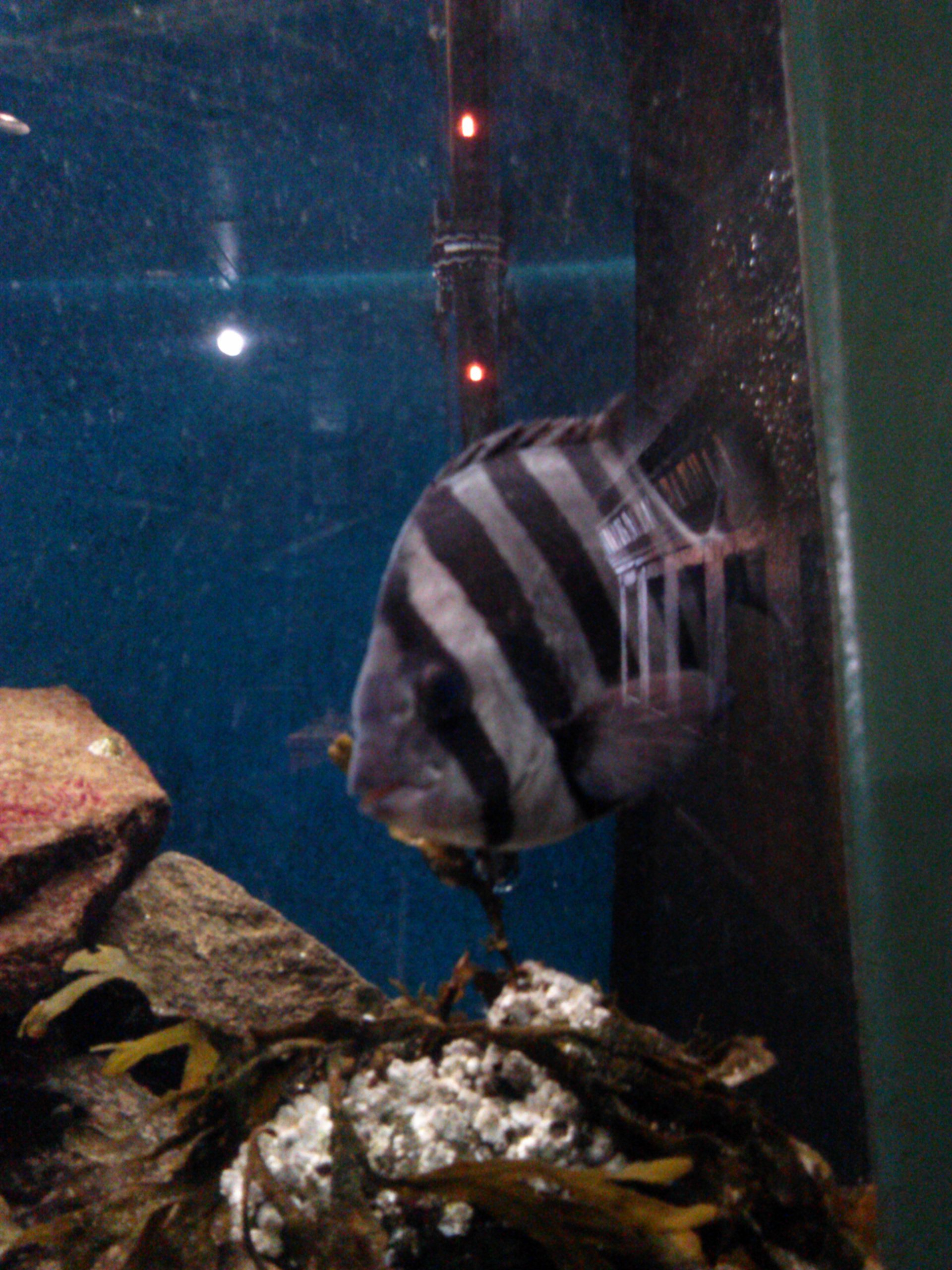
The Tsunami fish in December 2013

Five barred knifejaws endured more than 2 years in the partially submerged hull of the Japanese boat Saishoumaru (斎勝丸). The tsunami fish is the last surviving specimen of those five knifejaws.

The boat broke loose and went adrift during the March 11, 2011 Tōhoku earthquake and tsunami. On March 22, 2013, the boat washed onshore in North America at Long Beach, Washington, more than 4,000 miles (6,400 km) from its starting point. The fish, as of November of 2024, still resides at the Seaside Aquarium in Seaside, Oregon.

The Tōhoku earthquake occurred on March 11, 2011, and was the most powerful reliably measured earthquake in Japanese history. The resulting tsunami swept the 20 foot (6.1 m) Saishoumaru out to sea and inundated its storage compartments with seawater containing marine life, including several knifejaw fry. During the ensuing two-year drift across the Pacific Ocean, the fish likely matured into juveniles. Scientists speculate that the fish were deposited into the ghost ship by sea waves either off the coast of Japan or Hawaii.

The boat was discovered beached on the Washington coast on March 22, 2013, its internal hold now forming an "aquarium" for the five knifejaws as well as more than 30 plant and invertebrate species. Four were euthanized shortly after their discovery by the Washington Department of Fish and Wildlife, due to the concerns that the warm-water fish could become an invasive species. The fifth was brought to the city hall in a bucket, after which the Seaside Aquarium agreed to add the fish to their collection. As of late 2013, the fish is on display at the aquarium.

Between 2014 and 2015, divers spotted at least one other specimen in the wild off the coast of California, again argued to have travelled on or in debris from the tsunami.

Several barred knifejaws swimming in a tank in Japan

== Barred knifejaw in aquaculture ==
Many East-Asian countries (primarily China and Japan) farm the barred knifejaw for many purposes including the commercial sale and recreational activities associated with them. Much of the aquaculture surrounding the barred knifejaw is the result of it having been ranched for the purpose of feeding blue-fin tuna hatcheries. More recently, aquaculture has shifted towards helping support the native populations of the knifejaw throughout the Zhoushan Sea region of the East China Sea due to the pressure to harvest them as a culinary delicacy. As a result of the farming, the barred knifejaws have been selectively bred with the intention of yielding a larger fish.

In recent years, studies have been conducted to investigate if the genetic variability of the barred knifejaw was declining due to the constant addition of hatchery fish into their natural habitats. The results of the study concluded that while there were genetic differences between the natural and stocked knifejaws, with approximately a third of the genetic variation also being found amongst the natural population, suggesting that there may be no immediate short-term effects, though the population should still be monitored.

One of the biggest challenges that must be overcome while working with the barred knifejaw in aquaculture is preventing or limiting the damage done by pathogenic invasion throughout the species. In 1988, red sea bream iridovirus (RSIV) was observed in a South Korean rock bream population resulting in mass mortality across many experimental populations. Furthermore, recent studies suggest that RSIV, and presumably other iridoviruses, have the potential to not only be highly transmissible between fish of the same genus, but also to infect fishes of other genera.

== Iridoviruses in barred knifejaw populations ==
Iridioviruses are one of the biggest threats to many rock bream populations due to high mortality and high transmissibility rates associated with them. Because of the high mortality rates associated with different iridoviruses, they have proved to be an obstacle for many susceptible fishes, and in particular O. fasciatus.

A specific iridovirus variant, Red sea bream iridovirus, has caused mass mortality across many fishes, including juvenile yellowfin tuna, and in 1988, the first documented mass mortality was observed across Korean rock bream populations. Since then, high amounts of mortality have happened annually due to iridovirus infections. In 2011, a documentation of Rock Bream Iridovirus, (RBIV)-C1, identified the first genus-specific iridovirus to infect hatchery Rock Bream. Further gene sequencing had been performed and had found that it was likely to have evolved from or alongside other iridoviruses that infected fish in the same geographic area^{[22]}. In lab settings, vaccination using viral membrane proteins similar to those from RBIV had proved effective in yielding an immune response. Furthermore, poly (I:C) inoculation, (a form of mechanism that inoculates via the usage of RNA and antigens from the pathogen) of rock bream has proved to also induce immune responses which play a speculated role in the inhibition of virus replication in infected hosts.
