= Basket =

Container woven of stiff fibres

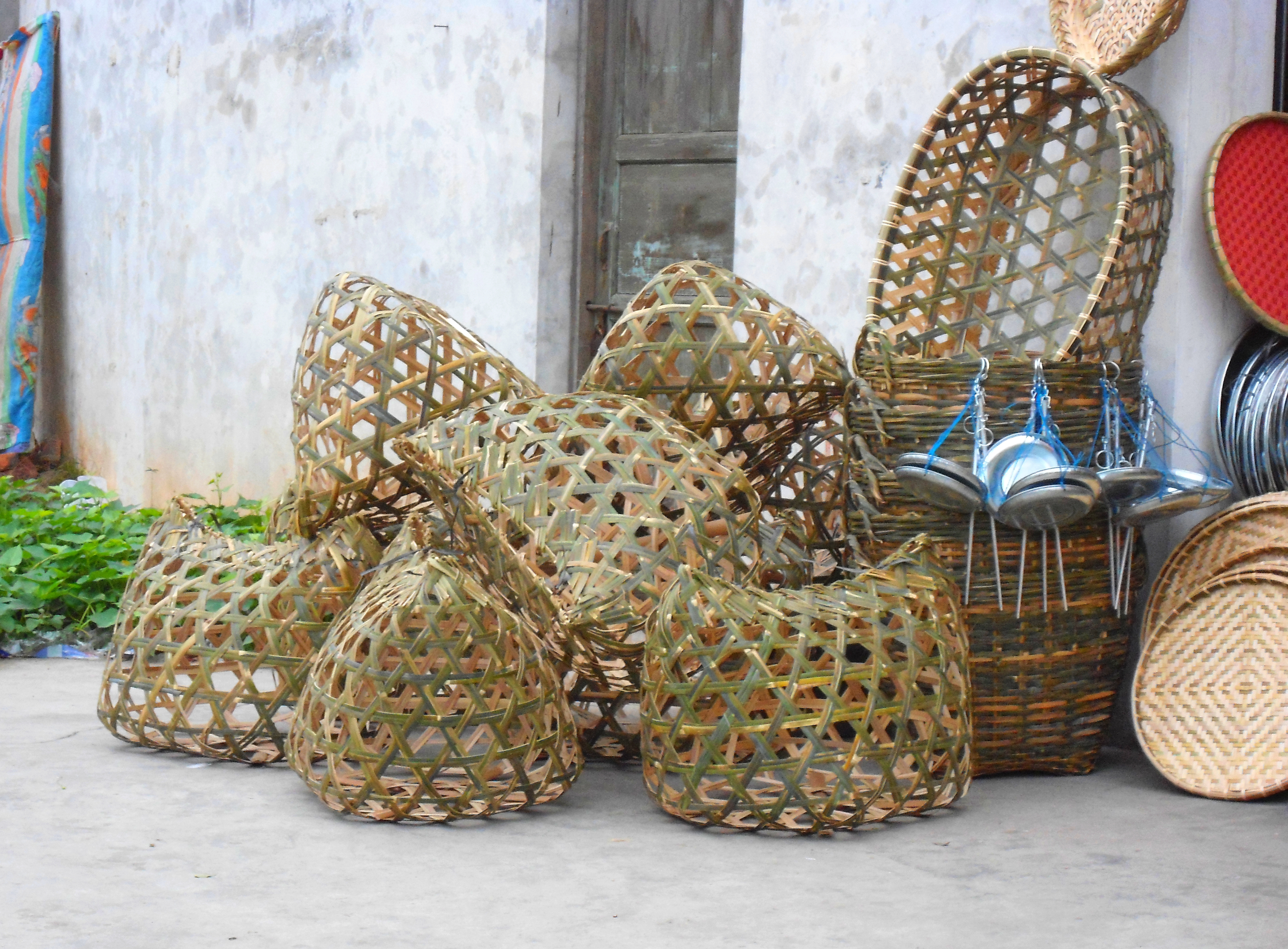
On the left side are live fowl baskets. Directly to the right are flat baskets used for selling shrimp and small fish in Haikou City, Hainan Province, People's Republic of China.

A basket is a container that is traditionally constructed from stiff fibers, and can be made from a range of materials, including wood splints, runners, and cane. While most baskets are made from plant materials, other materials such as horsehair, baleen, or metal wire can be used. Baskets are generally woven by hand. Some baskets are fitted with a lid, while others are left open on top.

== Uses ==
Baskets serve aesthetic as well as utilitarian purposes. Some baskets are ceremonial, that is religious, in nature. While baskets are usually used for harvesting, storage and transport, specialized baskets are used as sieves for a variety of purposes, including cooking, processing seeds or grains, tossing gambling pieces, rattles, fans, fish traps, and laundry.

== History ==
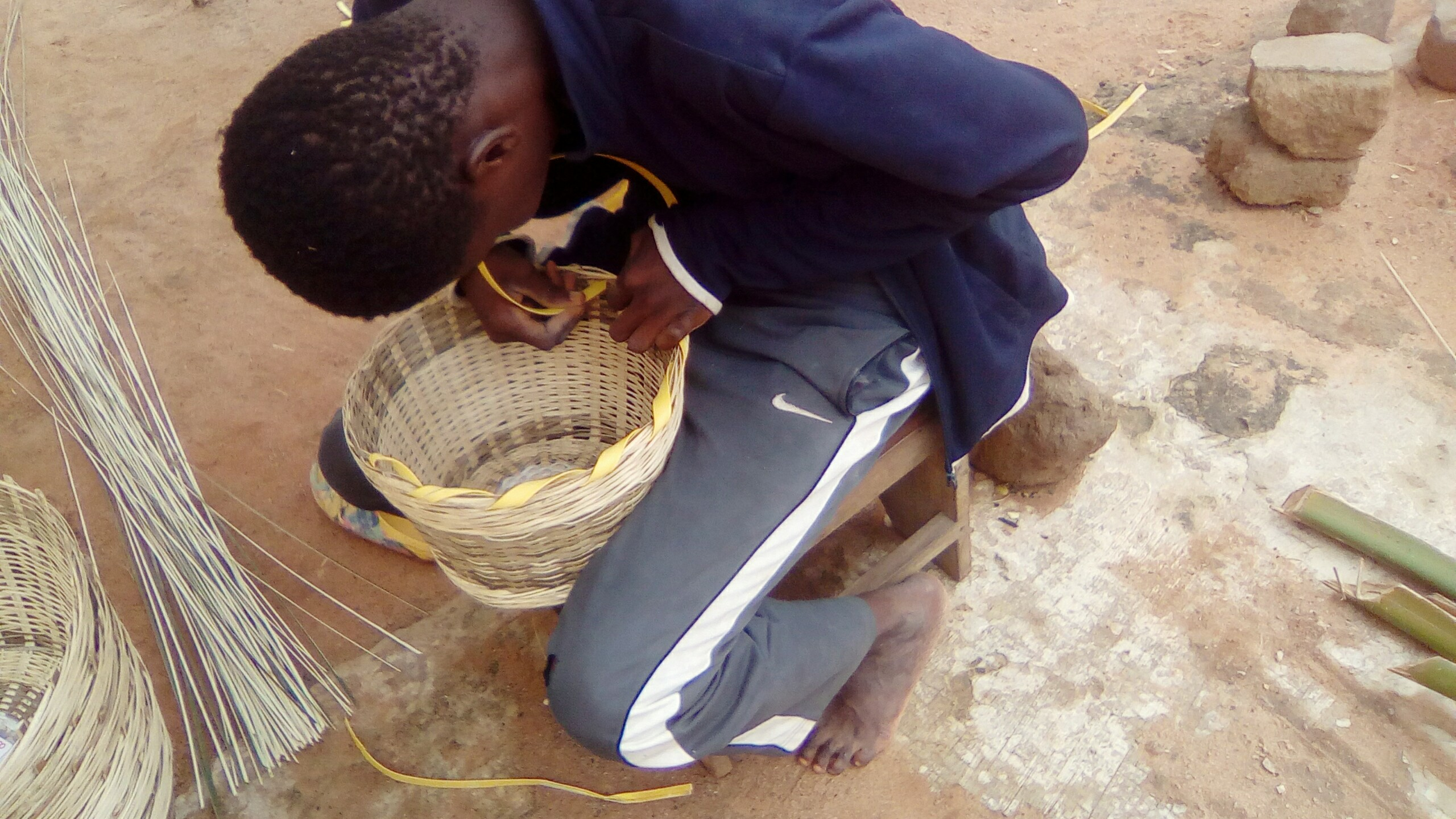
A young man making a palm basket.

Prior to the invention of woven baskets, people used tree bark to make simple containers. These containers could be used to transport gathered food and other items, but crumbled after only a few uses. Weaving strips of bark or other plant material to support the bark containers would be the next step, followed by entirely woven baskets. The last innovation appears to be baskets so tightly woven that they could hold water.

Depending on soil conditions, baskets may or may not be preserved in the archaeological record. Sites in the Middle East show that weaving techniques were used to make mats, and possibly also baskets, circa 8000 BCE. Twined baskets date back to 7000 BCE in Oasisamerica. Baskets made with interwoven techniques were common at 3000 BCE.

Baskets were originally designed as multi-purpose vessels to carry and store materials and to keep stray items about the home. The plant life available in a region affects the choice of material, which in turn influences the weaving technique. Rattan and other members of the Arecaceae or palm tree family, the thin grasses of temperate regions, and broad-leaved tropical bromeliads each require a different method of twisting and braiding to be made into a basket. The practice of basket making has evolved into an art. Artistic freedom allows basket makers a wide choice of colors, materials, sizes, patterns, and details.

The carrying of a basket on the head, particularly by rural women, has long been practiced. Representations of this in Ancient Greek art are called canephorae.

== Figurative and literary usage ==
The phrase "to hell in a handbasket" means to deteriorate rapidly. The origin of this use is unclear. Basket is sometimes used as an adjective for a person who is born out of wedlock. This occurs more commonly in British English. Basket may also refer to a bulge in a man's crotch. The word basket is frequently used in the colloquial "don't put all your eggs in one basket". In this sense, the eggs are a metaphor for a chance at success, while the basket figuratively represents a single method or option.

== Materials ==
Basket makers use a wide range of materials, including:

- Bamboo
- Carbon fiber
- Metal
- Palm
- Plastic
- Straw
- Wicker (traditionally made of willow, rattan, reed, and bamboo)

== Image gallery ==
Different baskets

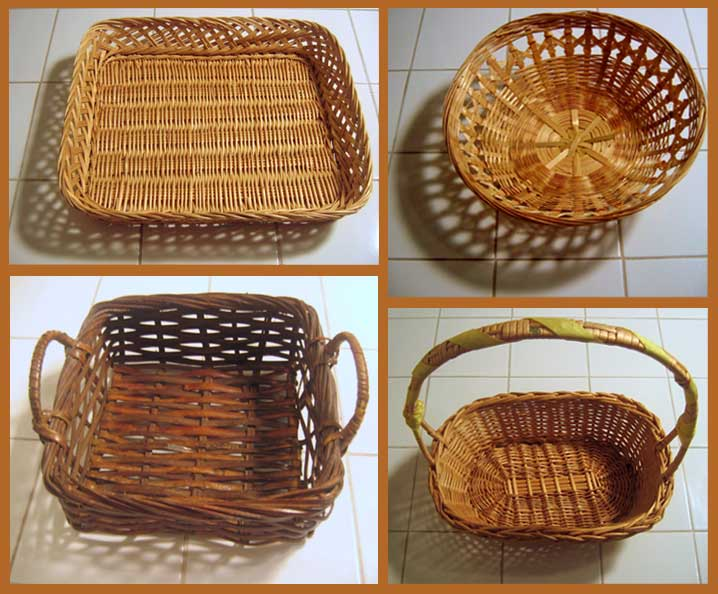
Four styles of baskets

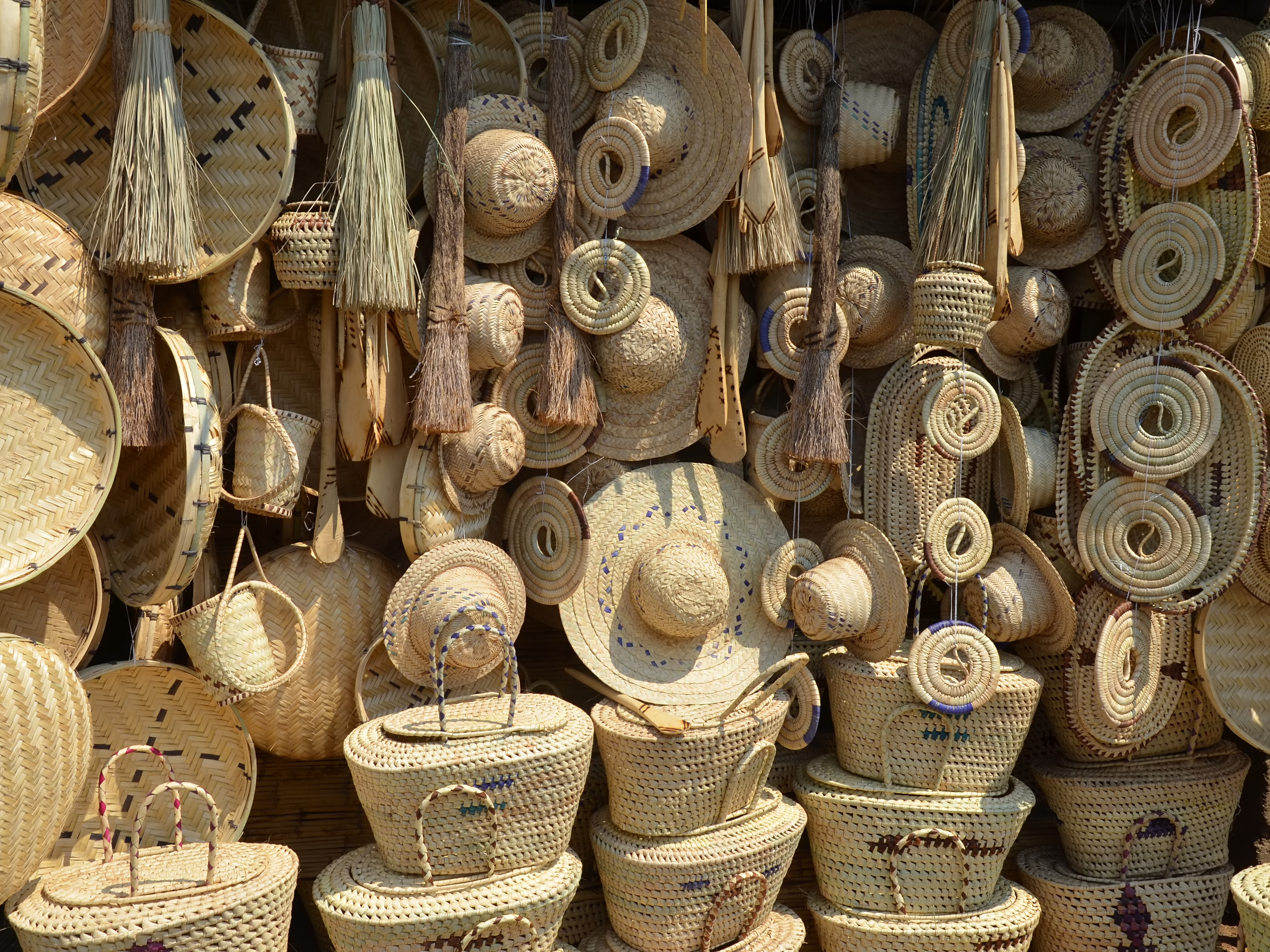
Straw hats and baskets for sale at the Luangwa turn-off on Great East Road, Zambia

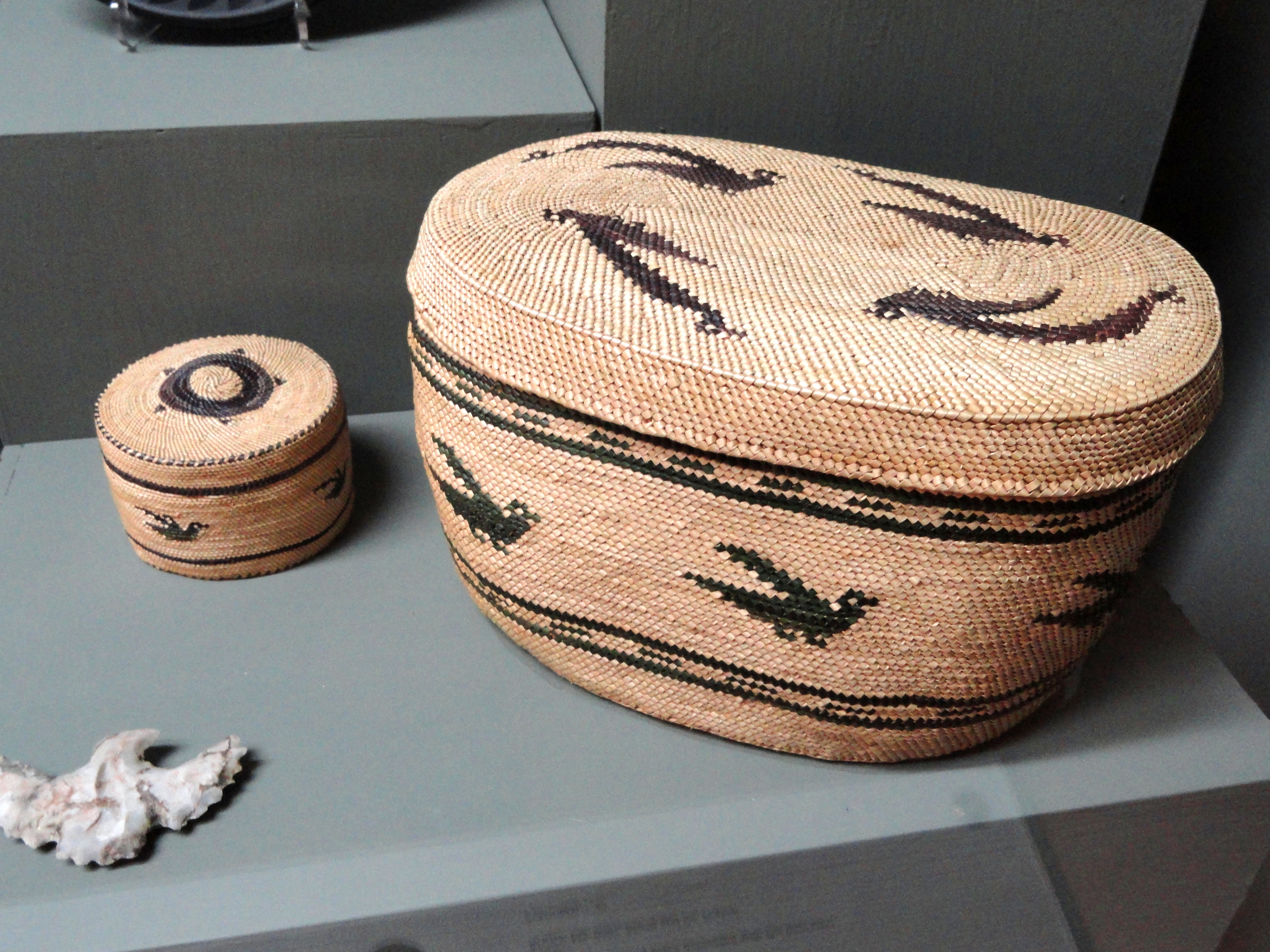
Nootka Makah baskets

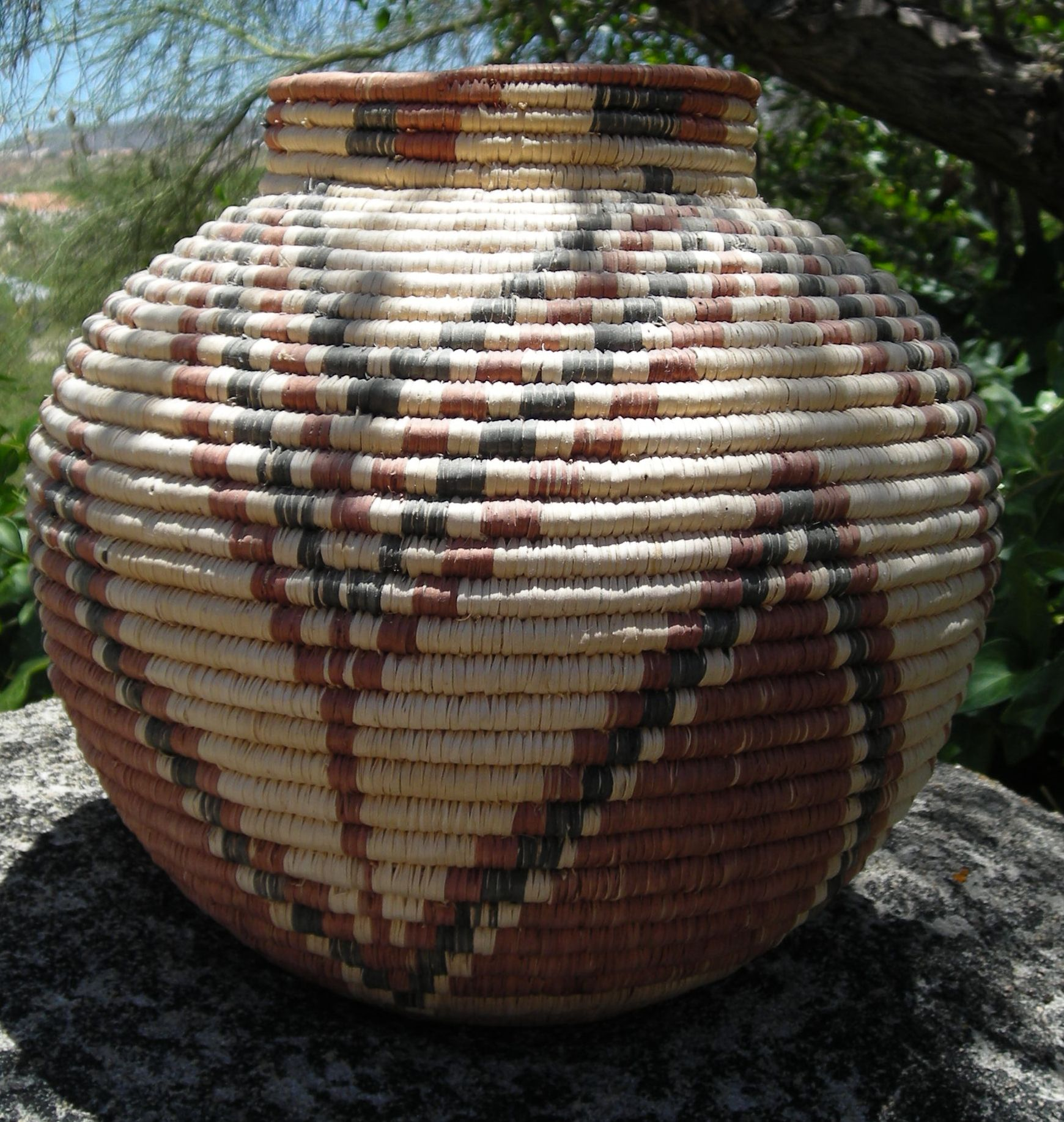
Seri Indian pot-shaped basket from northern Mexico

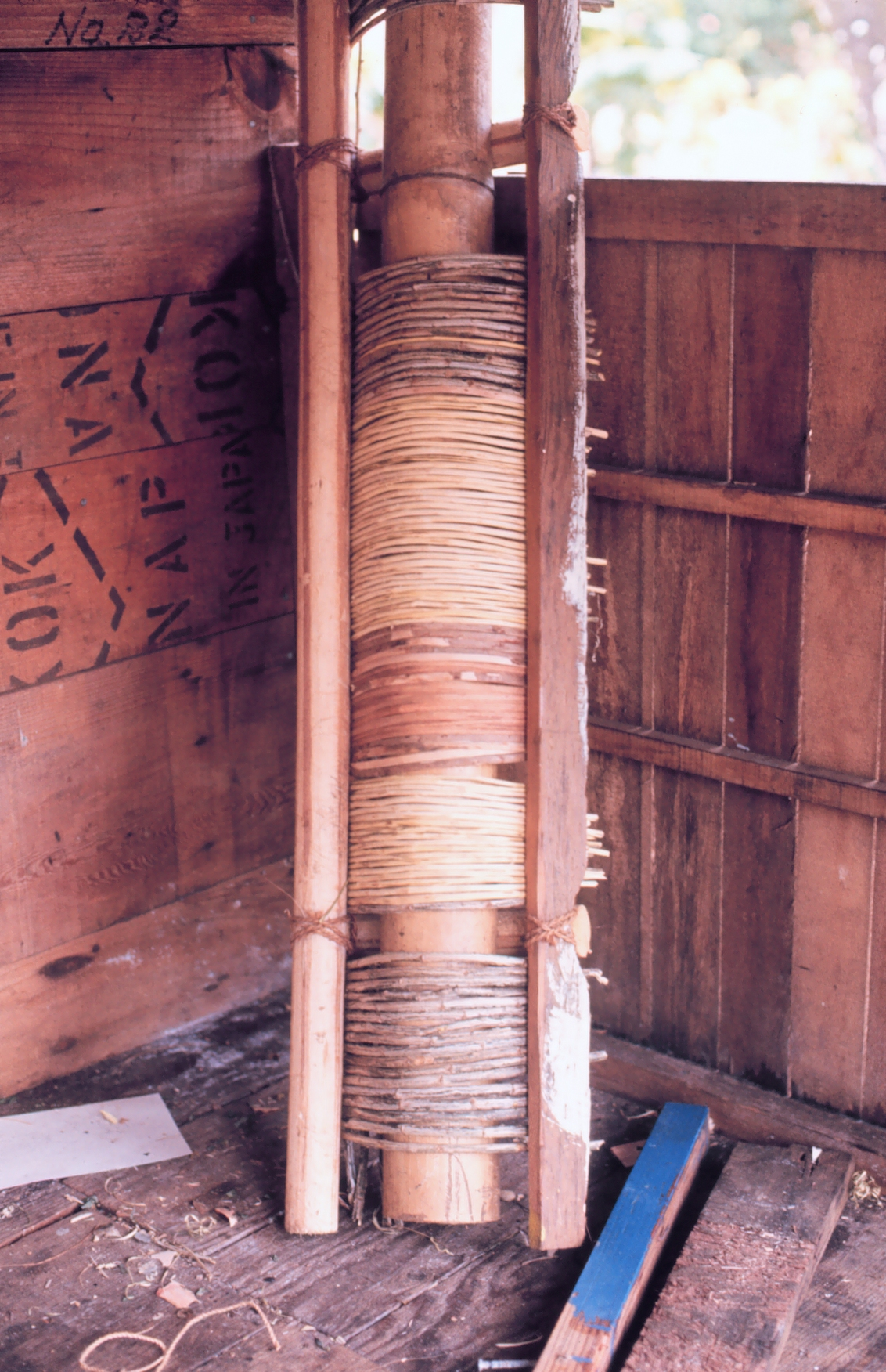
Bending vines for basket construction - Pohnpei

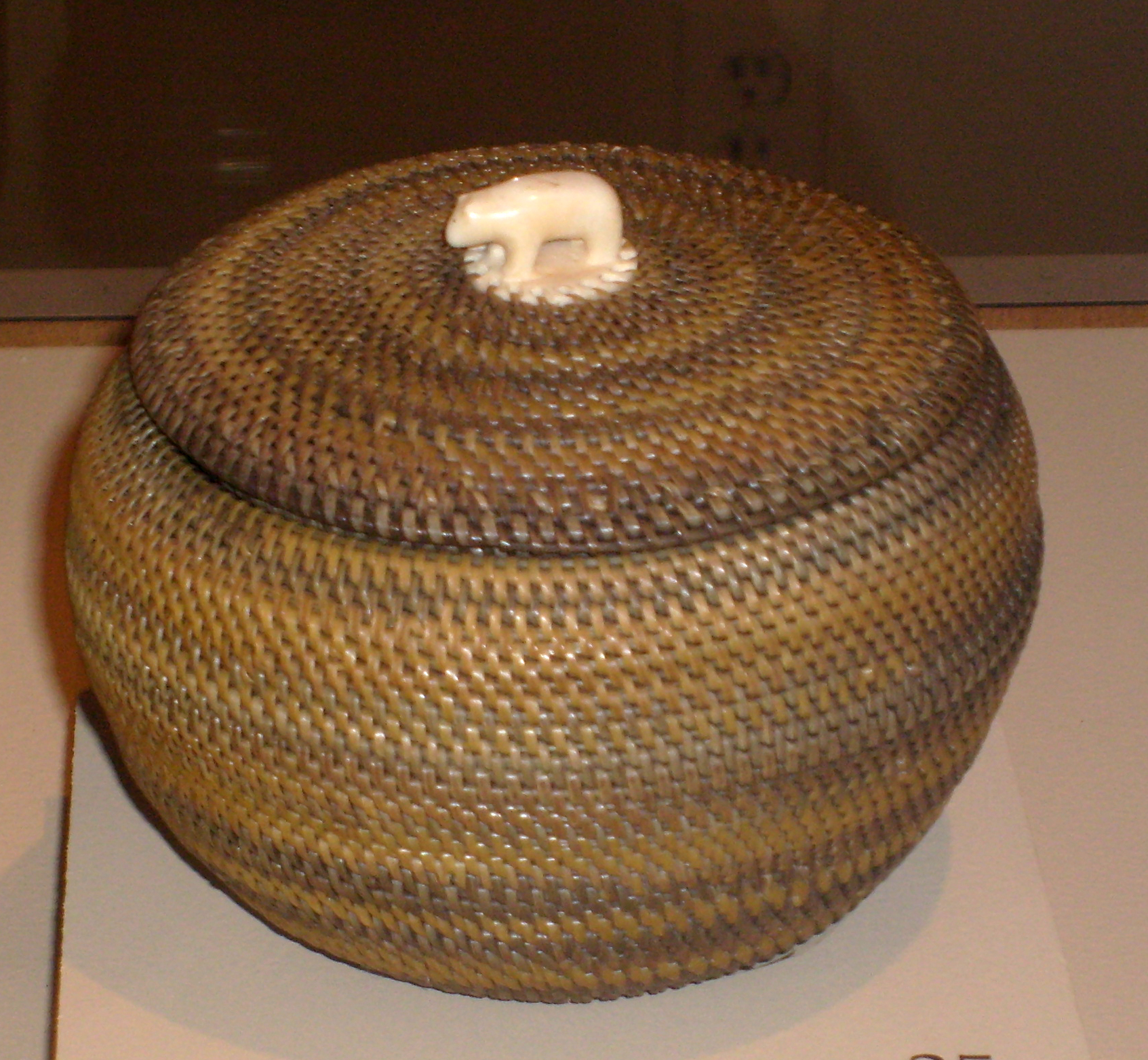
Inupiat basket of whale baleen with a walrus ivory finial, Barrow, Alaska

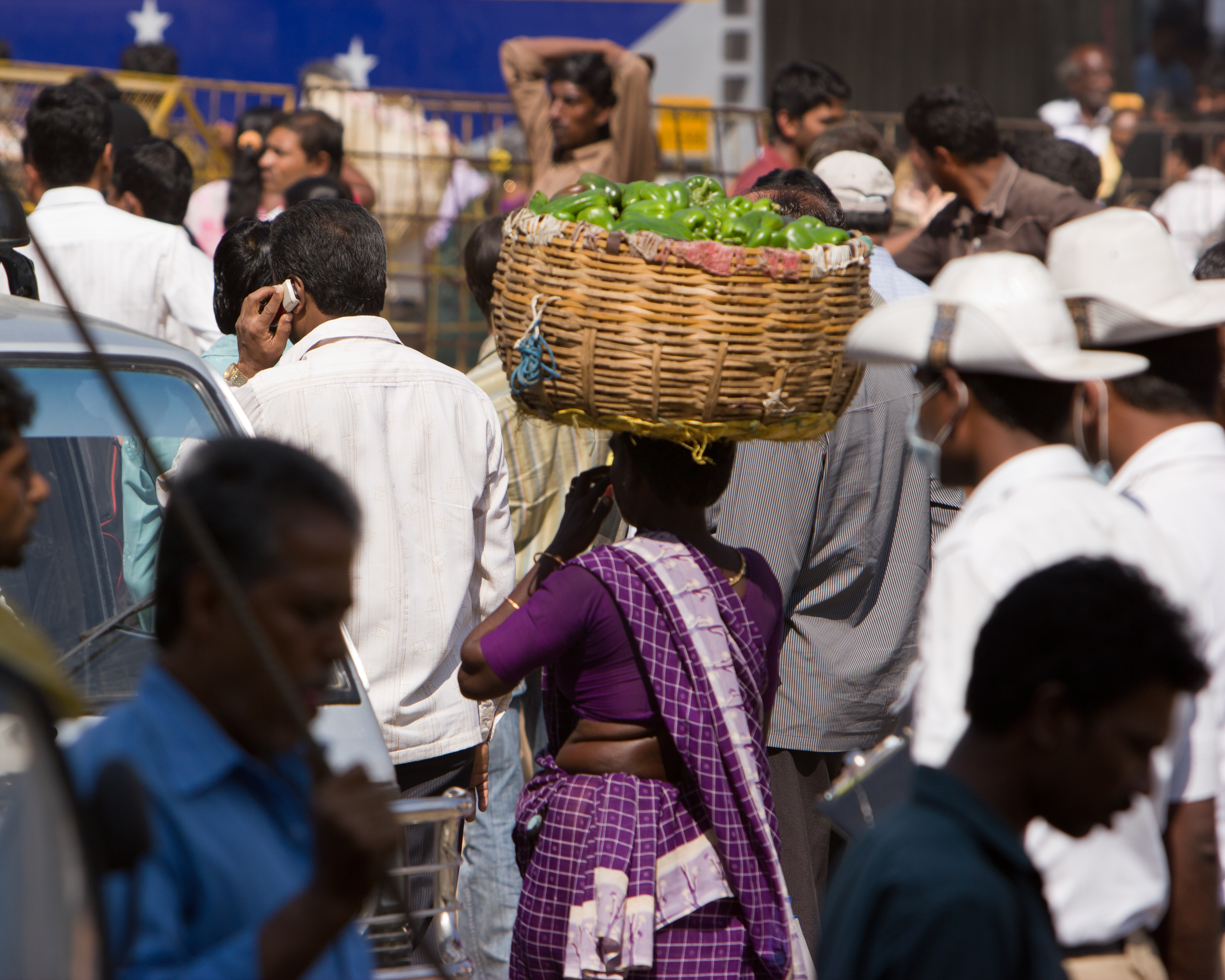
A woman carrying a basket full of vegetables on her head in K R Market, Bangalore, India

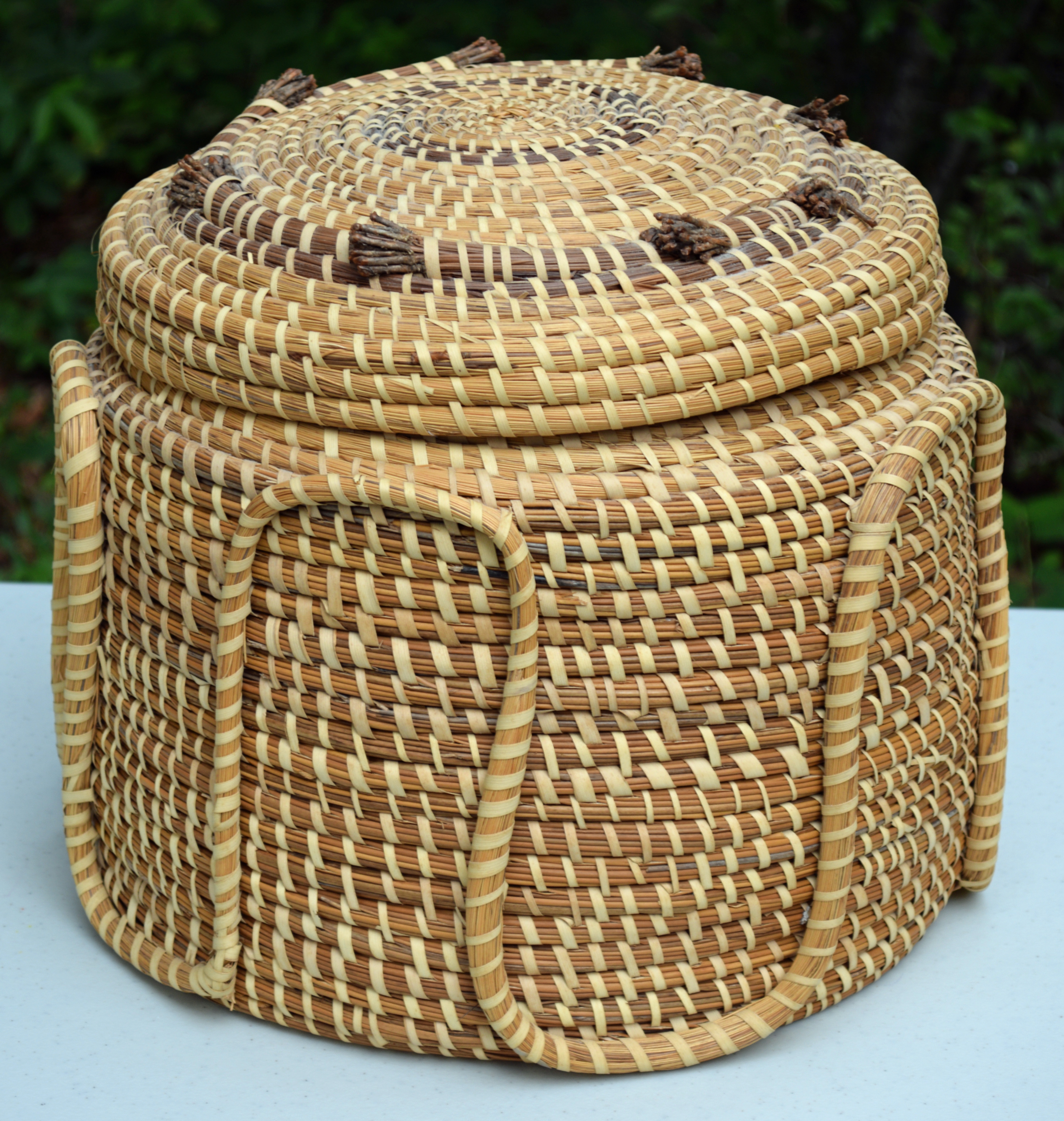
Sweetgrass basket made by the Gullah culture of coastal Georgia or South Carolina, US

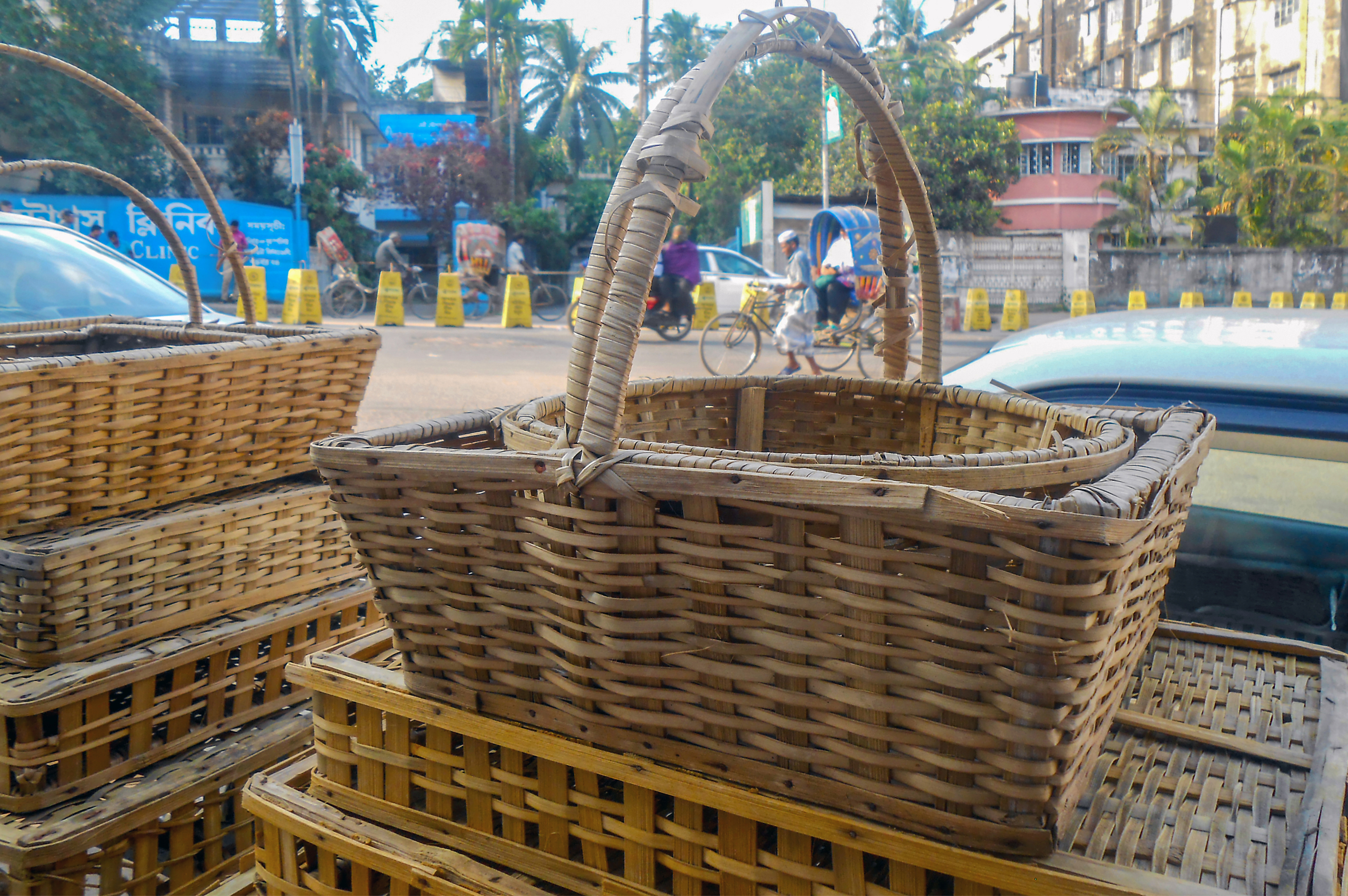
Contemporary bamboo baskets of Bangladesh

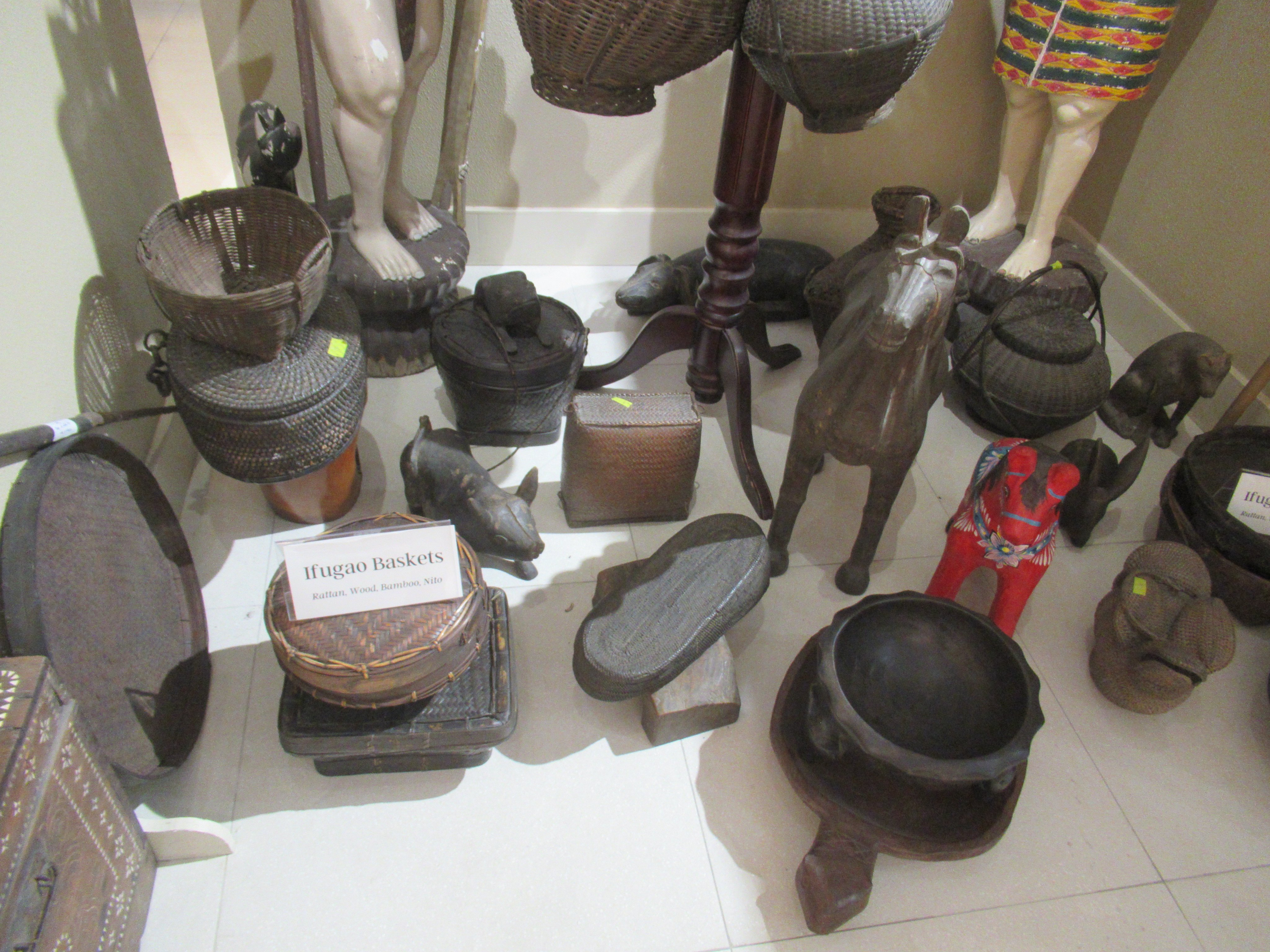
Ifugao baskets in a museum

== See also ==
- Basket weaving
- Canephorae
- Weaving
- Native American basketry
- Native American basket weavers
- Baleen basketry
- Fruits Basket Japanese Manga series

== Sources ==
- Zepeda, Ofelia (1995). Ocean Power: Poems from the Desert. ISBN 0-8165-1541-7.
