= Shenzhen school uniform =

Standardized student uniform worn in Shenzhen, China

- Type: School uniform
- Place of origin: Shenzhen, Guangdong, China
- Introduced: September 2002

Shenzhen school uniform is the citywide standardized school uniform worn by students in Shenzhen, Guangdong, China, in public primary and secondary schools. First introduced in 2002, its basic blue-and-white sportswear design has remained largely unchanged and has been noted in Chinese popular culture as part of Shenzhen's local identity.

== History ==
Most public schools in China prescribe school uniform for their students, but design and procurement are typically handled at the level of each individual school. Shenzhen adopted a citywide standard design in 2002 and was one of the first few cities in China to do so, following complaints about uneven quality and pricing of earlier school-specific uniforms. The blue-and-white sportwear uniform has since become a recognizable symbol of local identity. Private schools may use separate designs; for example, Shenzhen Yaohua Experimental School uses its own school uniform.

Uniforms are generally purchased by families through retailer outlets rather than issued directly by schools. At one point, it was sold by Walmart China stores.

== Design ==
Student uniform is codified by a standard Specification for primary and secondary school uniforms (T/XFBZ 002–2019), covering uniform classification, style requirements, and wearing principles.

The uniform has different variants for primary and secondary school students, as well as winter, summer and autumn seasonal variants. A formal wear with a completely different design also exists but is rarely used.

The informal sportswear for daily wear consists of:

- A polo shirt with the collar in secondary color, as well as two lines on top of both sleeves extending to the end for primary students, or sideways for secondary school students. Boys wear blue-and-white shirts, while girls wear white-and-blue shirts.
- A zipped jacket for winter, in the matching color of polo shirt for primary school students, or white and deep blue per wavy bend sinister unisex for secondary school students.
- Blue shorts (unisex, also below) with two white vertical bars each side, or
- Trousers, blue with one thick bar (primary), or dark blue with thick and thin bars (secondary).
Shenzhen school uniforms on Wikimedia Commons

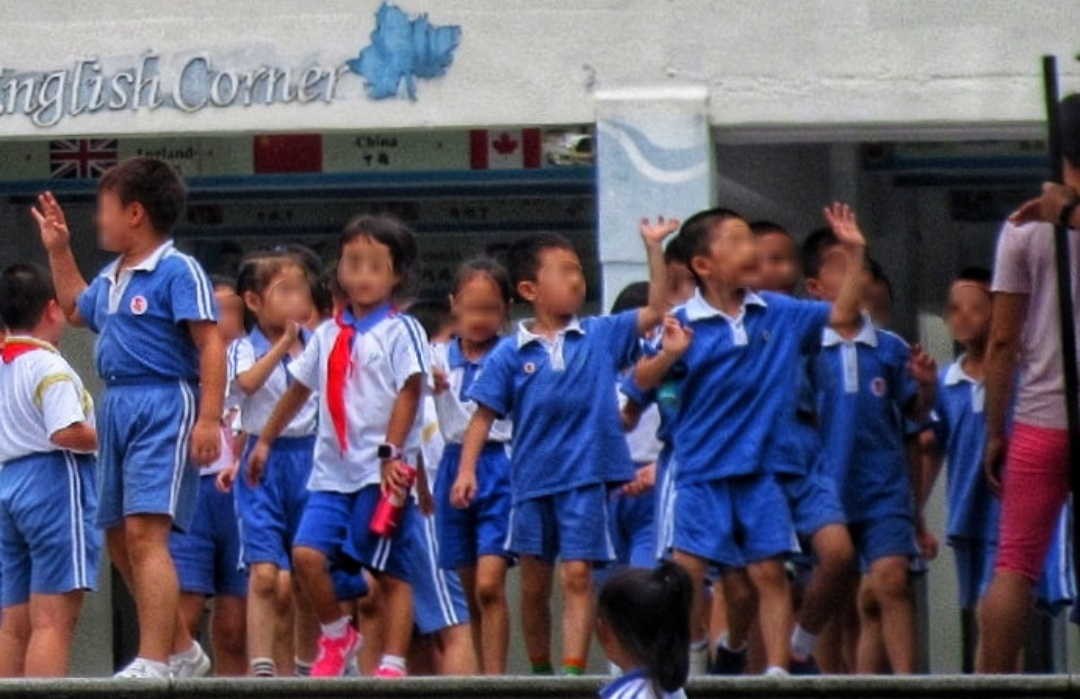
Primary school uniform (2017)

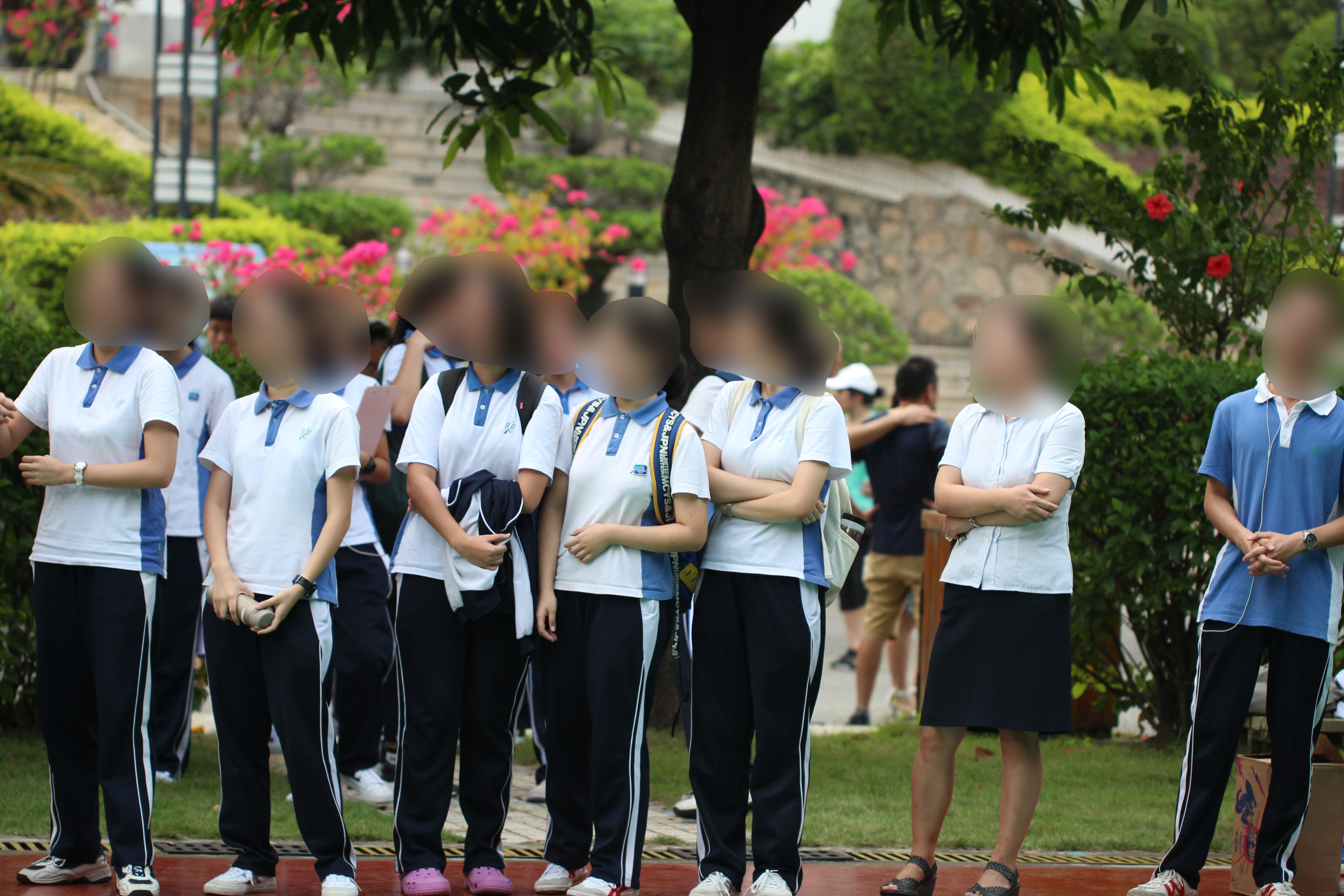
Secondary school summer uniform (2017)

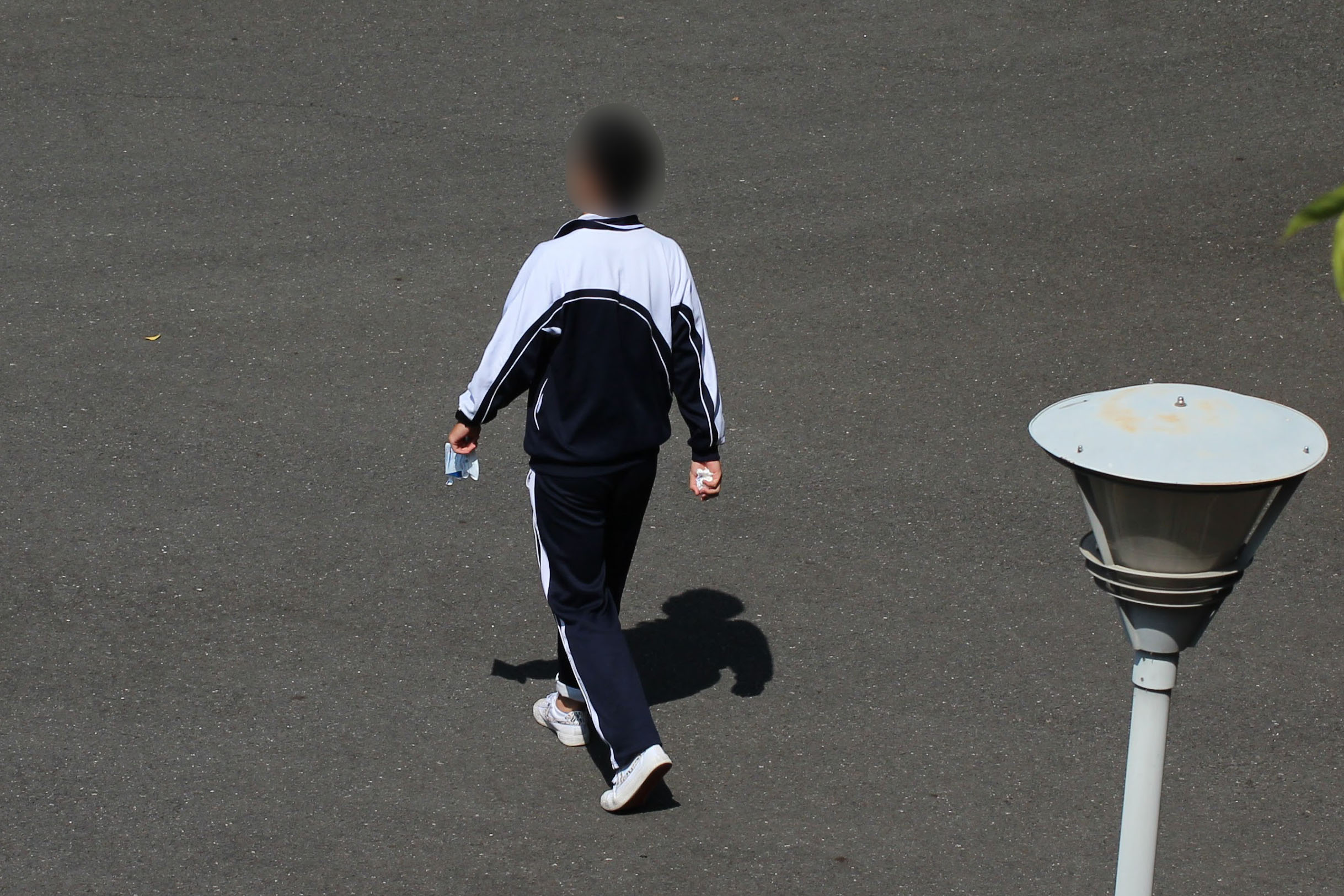
Secondary school winter uniform (2017)

== Cultural impact ==
The uniform has been widely recognized as a symbol of Shenzhen outside the city and even abroad, with some students choosing to continue wearing it after graduation. Individual sportswear items are also sold and worn beyond Shenzhen, including in other Chinese cities and in Taiwan. A Shenzhen secondary school winter sportswear set was acquired by Victoria and Albert Museum for permanent exhibition.

== See also ==
- School uniforms by country
