= Baleen basketry =

Basketry made from whale baleen

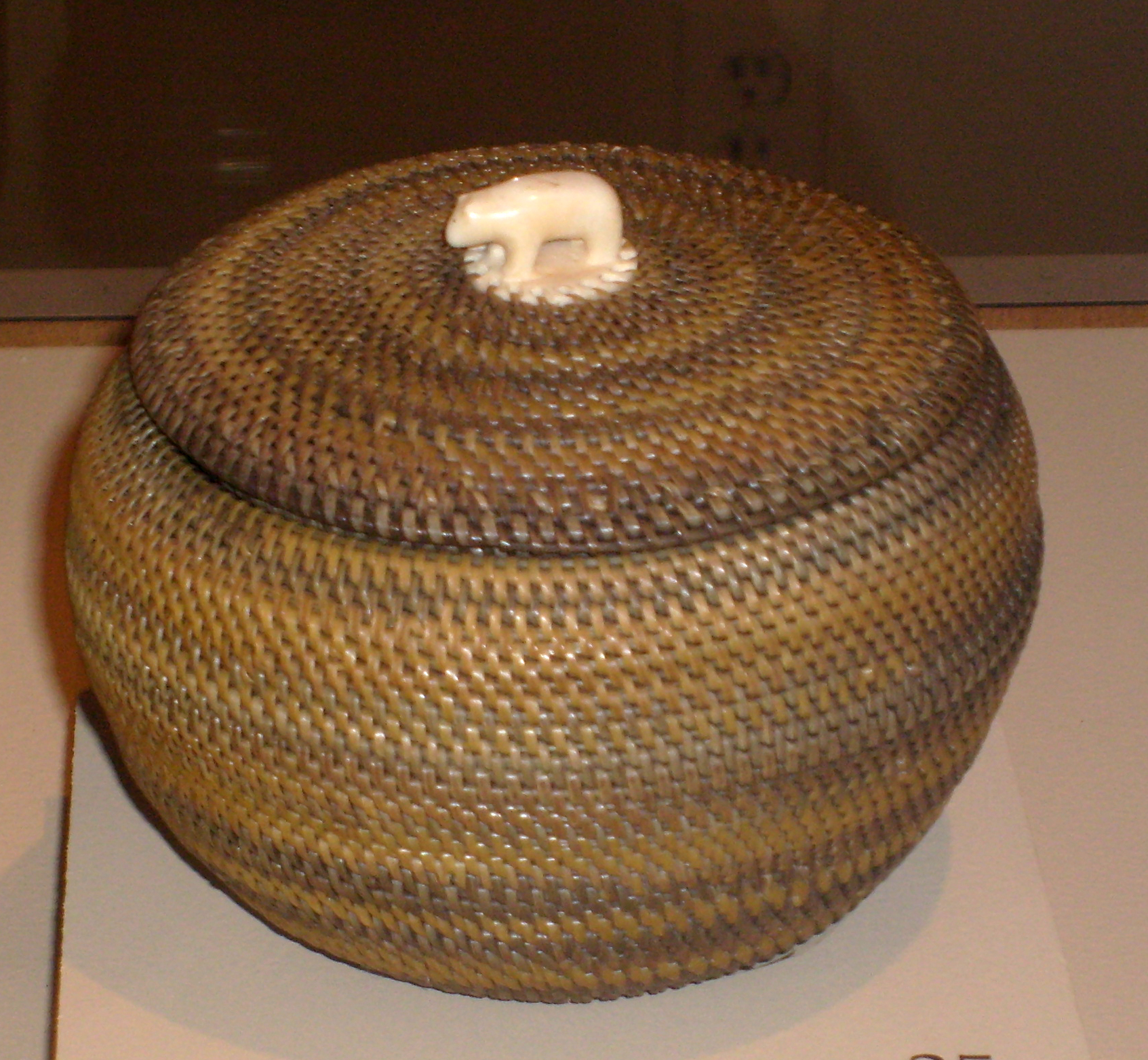
Inupiat baleen basket, with an ivory handle (finial), made by Kinguktuk (Kiŋaqtaq 1871–1941) of Utqiagvik, Alaska. Displayed at the Museum of Man, San Diego, California.

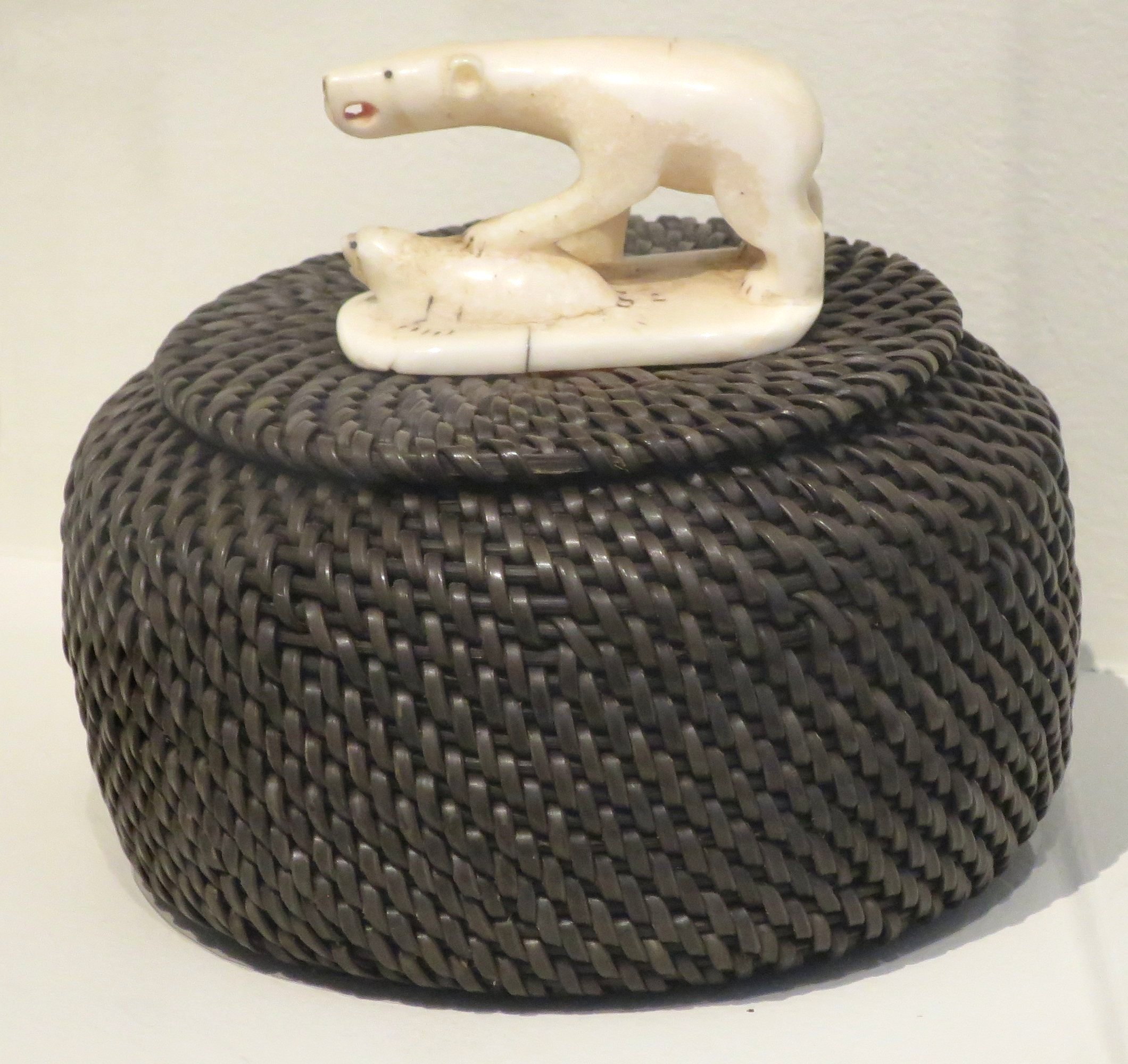
Inupiat baleen basket, with an ivory polar bear and seal handle (finial), made by George Omnik (1905 - 1978) of Point Hope, Alaska. Displayed at the Honolulu Museum of Art.

Baleen basketry is a particular type of basketry, an Alaska Native art made from whale baleen developed in Utqiagvik, Point Hope, and Wainwright, Alaska by North Alaskan Iñupiaq people. Created at the dawn of the 20th century, the baskets made with baleen (a flexible material found in the mouths of Mysticeti or baleen whales) were based on willow-root prototypes. Thin strips of baleen are cut and attached to ivory disks at the start. A coiling method is used to sew baleen bands together, ending with a carved ivory knob on the handle. Most baleen baskets are made by men for sale to tourists, but over time distinctive styles have developed, and since the 1970s more women have become involved in what was originally a predominantly male occupation. Expertly carved finials made by the Siberian Yupik of the St. Lawrence Island and Iñupiaq of the King Island are often used as the handles.

The first baleen (suqqaq, qupitalik, savigaaq in Iñupiaq) basket (aguummak, aguummaq in Iñupiaq) was made at Utqiagvik after the termination of commercial whaling. The exact date is still in doubt, but the preponderance of available evidence suggests the event took place sometime between 1914 and 1918, after whaling ended and before the intensification of the North American fur trade. so this is one of the youngest basketry traditions in North America.

Kinguktuk (1871–1941, also spelled Kiŋaqtaq in Iñupiaq; and his wife: Qusraaq) is recognized as the first baleen basketmaker with his first pieces made between 1914 and 1918 in Utqiagvik. He was perhaps the only baleen basketmaker as late as 1931. Today, most baleen basketmakers live in Point Hope, Alaska. Kinguktuk's early baskets were woven in the single-rod coiling of their willow-root prototypes, and already had starter pieces, the perforated ivory discs used to attach beginning stitches, at the center of their lids and bases.
