= Laundry basket =

Container used for storing clothes

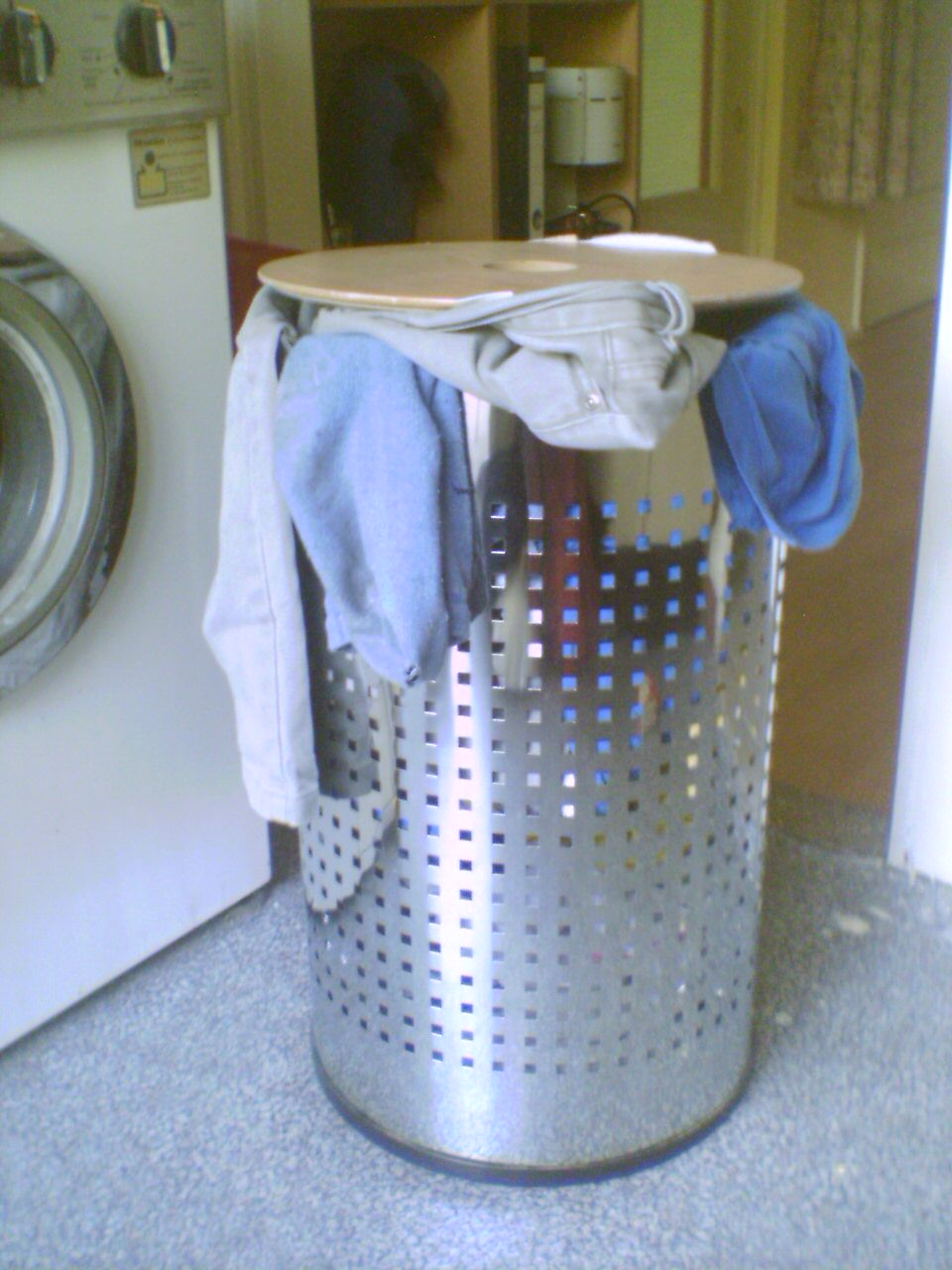
Laundry basket filled with dirty laundry

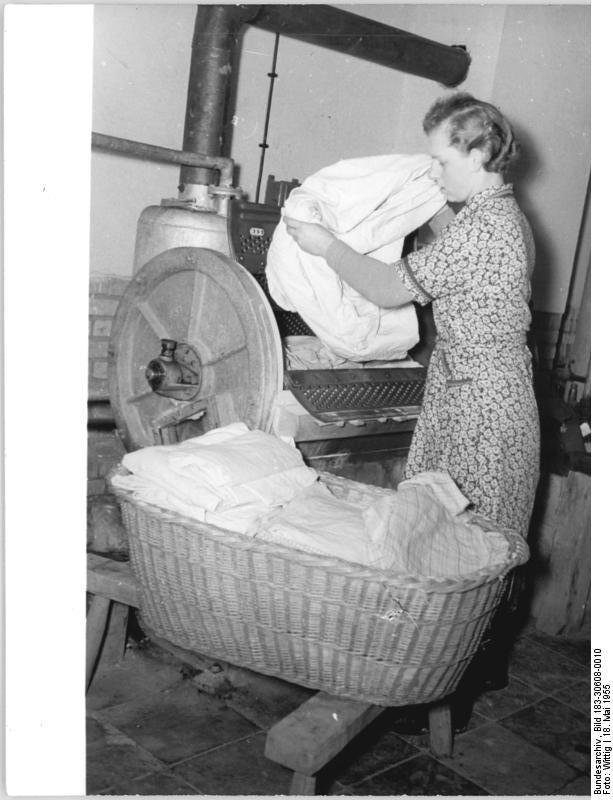
Stacking of clothes for transport

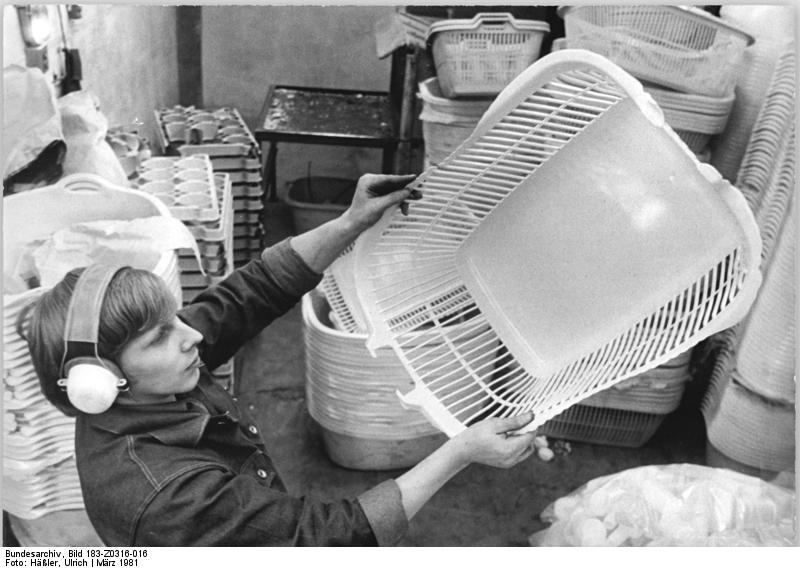
Production of plastic baskets in Ottendorf-Okrilla, Saxony (1981)

A laundry basket (also known as a hamper) is a basket used for storing clean or dirty clothes, for storage before washing and drying, or for transporting clothes. They are used to keep clean and dirty laundry collected and organised, and can prevent clothes from getting lost or mixed up. Laundry baskets are often placed in a bathroom or laundry room as a piece of furniture in a home, while laundry bags are sometimes used to keep dirty laundry separate during travel.

Different boxes can be used for sorting the laundry according to their intended washing programs, and when a basket is full this can indicate that it is time for doing laundry. It is recommended to separate dirty laundry used by ill people from dirty laundry to be used by healthy people, especially if the clothes will be washed at less than 60 Celsius.

Historically, dirty laundry has sometimes been a thing which people have tried to hide under stairs, counters, et cetera.

== Construction ==
Most clothes baskets are designed in such a way that air can circulate so that any moisture in the laundry can escape.

=== Materials ===
Clothes baskets can be made of various materials such as wood, plastic, metal, rope, ratten, braided willow or textile.

=== Form ===
The shape can vary, and baskets can be obtained, among other things, with a base surface that is circular, square or rectangular. Clothes baskets often have carrying handles or edges on two of the short sides so that they can be easily carried by one person. In addition to baskets, there are also laundry bags, boxes and crates. Some clothes baskets have a seat on top, which makes them a multifunctional furniture. Laundry baskets can vary greatly in shape and size from around 25 liters to 100 litres. In 2010, a concept was shown where the laundry basket also functioned as a washing machine.

== See also ==
- Laundry
- Laundry detergent
- Laundry room
- Basket
