= Upturned collar =

Collar that has been turned upward

An upturned collar (or popped collar) is an otherwise flat, protruding collar of either a shirt, Polo, jacket, or coat that has been turned upward.

== History ==
=== Origins ===
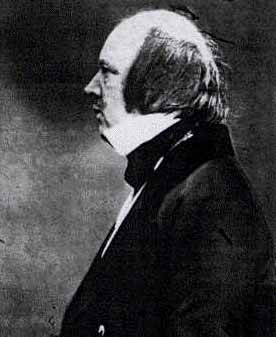
A standard upturned collar in the 19th century, exemplified by William Fox Talbot

Before the early 20th century, most shirt collars were turned up in some manner. Men and women alike wore tall, stiff collars (as much as three inches tall), not unlike a taller version of a clerical collar, made either of starched linen, cotton, or lace. The writer H. G. Wells remarked in his 1902 book Kipps that these "made [the] neck quite sore and left a red mark under [the] ears." Between the late 19th and mid-20th centuries, men's collars were often detachable from their shirts, connected only by two removable collar studs (one in front and one at the back). Detachable collars were very stiff, and either stood straight up (as in a Hamilton collar) or were pressed over at an ironed-in, starched crease (as in a Fremont collar). After World War II, mass-production gradually phased out detachable collars from ordinary dress shirts. Occasionally, one can still find detachable collar formal shirts, designed to be worn with a tuxedo or evening dress.

Lapels on jackets and coats were also occasionally worn turned up, as a fashion statement and to provide extra warmth. The frock coat of the 18th and 19th century often had a solid lapel that was always turned up. Gradually, toward the mid-to-late 19th century, however, lapels became folded down and "pieced out," in the peak, notched, or shawl lapel that one sees to this day.

=== Tennis shirts ===
With the advent of the tennis shirt, however, the upturned collar took on a whole new purpose. In 1929 René Lacoste, the French 7-time Grand Slam champion, decided that the stiff dress shirts and ties usually worn by tennis players were too cumbersome and uncomfortable for the tennis court. Instead, he designed a loosely-knit piqué cotton shirt with an unstarched, flat protruding collar and a longer shirt-tail in back than in front. This came to be known as the tennis shirt. Lacoste's design called for a thick piqué collar that one would wear turned up to block the sun from one's neck skin. Thus, the tennis shirt's upturned collar was originally designed by the inventor of the tennis shirt, himself, for ease and comfort on the tennis court, aiding the player by helping to prevent sunburn.

Gradually, as tennis shirts became more popular and were produced more widely, their use transcended tennis and was adopted for golf, polo, other sports, and everyday life. As the tennis shirt entered the popular culture, wearers were less apt to turn up their collar to block the sun if not wearing the shirt during sport or outdoor activity. Thus, most people began to wear a tennis shirt without the collar turned up, or turning them up only when involved in sport. The professional golfer Fuzzy Zoeller was known for this practice; as the golf shirt is a looser-fitting descendant of René Lacoste's tennis shirt, off the course Zoeller wears his golf shirt's collar turned down, whereas one often observes him with an upturned collar while he is playing.

== Adoption as popular culture trend ==
=== Initial adoption as trend ===
In 1980, Lisa Birnbach published The Official Preppy Handbook, in which she extolled the "virtues of the upturned collar". According to Ms. Birnbach, rather than being a sports innovation, the upturned collar on a tennis shirt was simply a signal that the wearer is a "preppy". Despite this obviously tongue-in-cheek characterization, Ms. Birnbach did correctly identify that one was more likely to view an upturned collar on the beaches of Nantucket than one would in middle America.

The book was a bestselling sensation. As a result, many people outside of the "preppy" enclaves of New England began emulating the style espoused in and categorized by Ms. Birnbach. As such, ordinary people in middle America who would not otherwise have done so began to wear the collars of their tennis shirts turned up as a popular culture trend, but not because of the collar's utilitarian purpose of blocking the sun. During the 1980s, many celebrities wore upturned collars. Joan Jett often upturned the collar of her leather jacket, as did Tiffany. Nevertheless, this style ultimately seemed to pass out of popular culture fashion by the middle of the 1990s.

=== Resurgence as trend ===
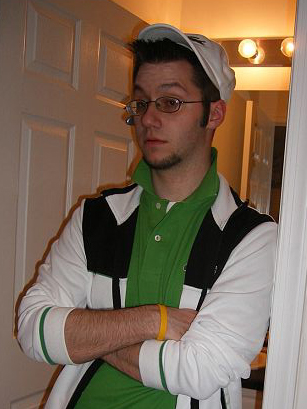
Young American man wearing the collar on his tennis shirt turned up as a part of a popular culture trend in the early 2000s.

In the early 2000s, however, the upturned collar underwent a resurgence in popularity as a trend in the popular culture, particularly in the United States, where some people began to refer to it as a "popped collar". Schools such as CSH Greenwich even had days dedicated to the trend such as "Pop your collar Thursday". The layering of multiple polo shirts with the collars up was also popular such as the double or triple popped collars. It also gained popularity as a trend in Europe (perhaps after football star Eric Cantona). Although the upturned collar no longer seems to be in vogue with the majority of European youth, older people still frequently wear upturned collars. Recently, certain Americans still perceive the upturned collar to be a "preppy" status symbol. This trend seems no longer to be limited to tennis shirts, as some people turn up the collars of shirts not designed to be worn that way.

Since the mid-2010s, some Americans have regarded the trend as having worn out, and thus the wearer of an upturned collar can be the object of mockery and scorn. Still, others continue to turn up their collars as a popular culture fashion. This has been bolstered by publicity from retailers with a middle-class clientele, such as Abercrombie & Fitch and American Eagle Outfitters (although Abercrombie & Fitch company styling requirements for the 2006 Holiday floorset officially said that their workers should not be turning their collars up).

The upturned collar fashion has remained relatively popular over the years and decades, by celebrities who occasionally and sometimes frequently wear their shirts this way. This includes celebrities such as Jane Fonda, Goldie Hawn, Sharon Stone, Kanye West, Oprah Winfrey, Michelle Obama, Diane Sawyer, Suze Orman, Wendie Malick, and Morgan Pressel, and Aishwarya Rai.

== In popular culture ==
=== Historical use ===
- Characters in many films set in the 18th century or 19th century, such as:
  - The Age of Innocence
  - Amadeus
  - Barry Lyndon
  - The Elephant Man
  - Gone with the Wind
  - Gosford Park
  - Hell on Wheels
  - Sherlock Holmes

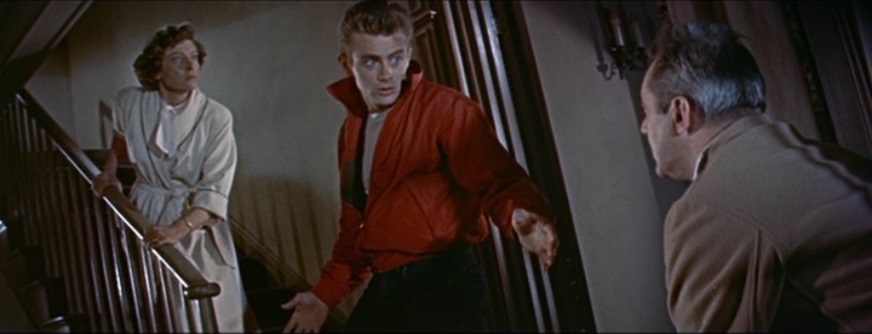
Actor James Dean (center) with an upturned collar in the film Rebel Without a Cause

=== For sport/utility/traditional use ===
- Members of Dan Aykroyd's character's tennis club in Trading Places
- Marlon Brando's character "Terry Malloy" in On the Waterfront
- Diane Keaton in the title role of Annie Hall
- Eric Cantona a French footballer playing for Manchester United in the 1990s

=== As a trend ===
- Many characters in the film Grease and Grease 2
- The Fonzie character in Happy Days
- James Dean's character "Jim Stark" in Rebel Without a Cause
- Tom Cruise's character "Joel Goodson" in Risky Business
- Andrew Dice Clay in The Adventures of Ford Fairlane
- Lane Smith as coach "Jack Riley" in the movie The Mighty Ducks
- Alex Turner of Arctic Monkeys
- Jana Ina on NBC GIGA
- Kick Buttowski from Kick Buttowski: Suburban Daredevil
- Jensen Ackles's character Dean Winchester from the hit TV show Supernatural
- Mentioned in the BBC series Sherlock. Dr. Watson specifically calls Sherlock out for "turning up his coat collar so he looks cool" in "The Hounds of Baskerville" episode.
- Former Indian cricketer Mohammad Azharuddin was famous for his style of wearing an upturned collar while on field as well as off field during his career.
- Many characters in the series Skins
- Kazuma Kiryu in the video game series Yakuza
- Snagglepuss in The Yogi Bear Show
- Grace Hanson in the show Grace and Frankie

== See also ==
- "Poppin' My Collar", a hiphop song about the trend.
- Collar (clothing)
