= Collar stay =

Shirt collar accessory

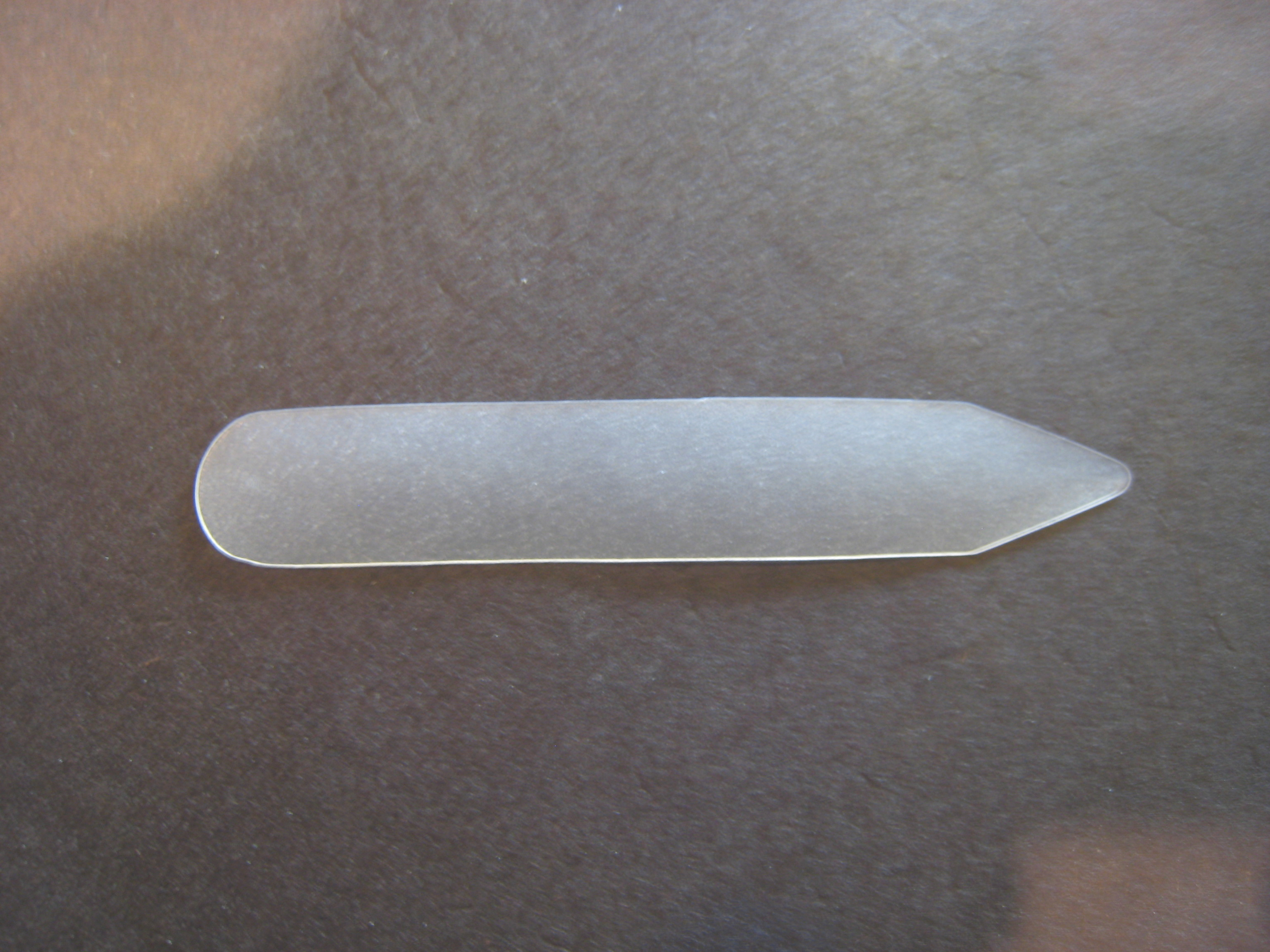
Plastic collar stay removed from shirt collar

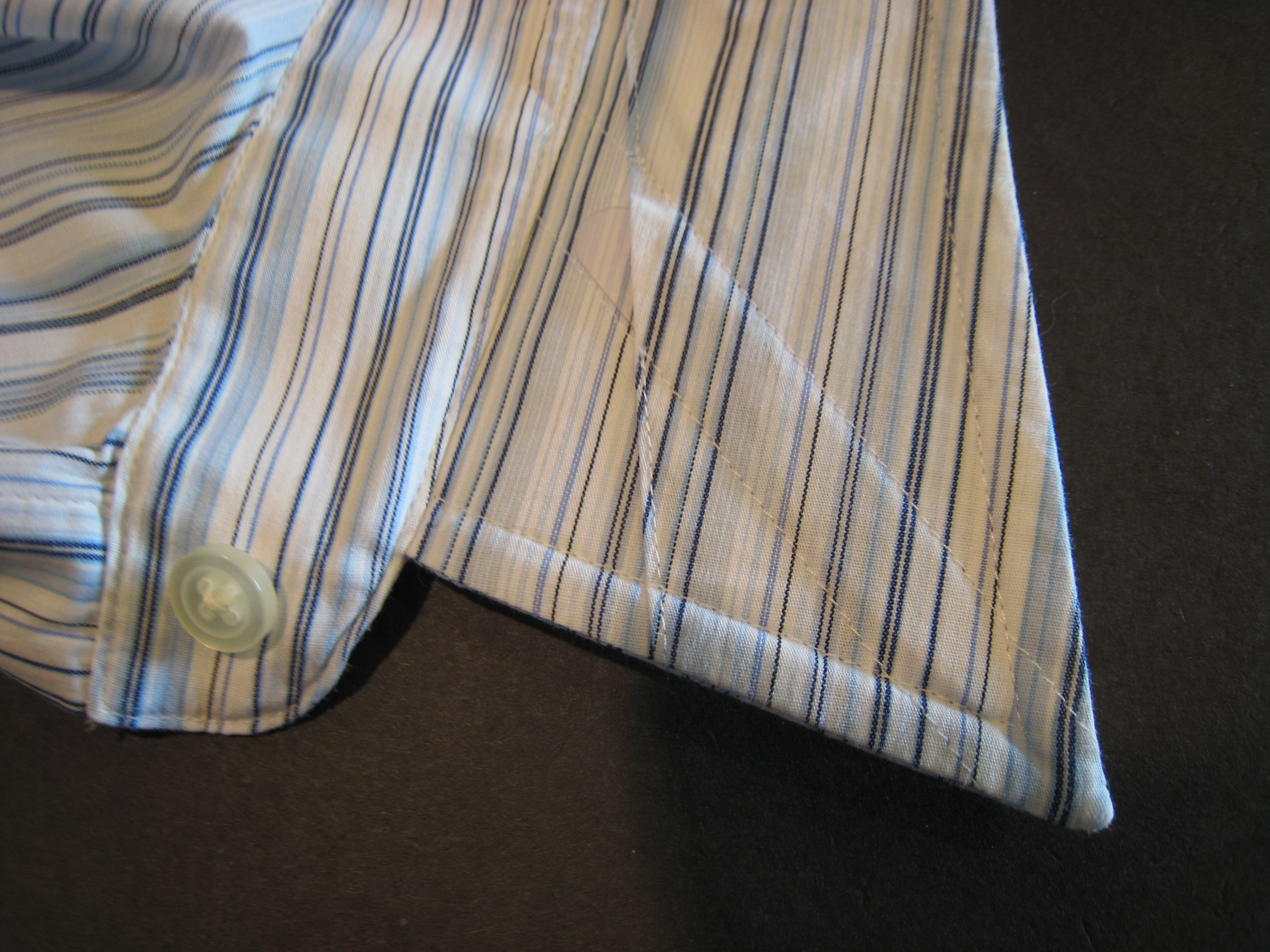
Underside of a men's shirt collar showing removable collar stay

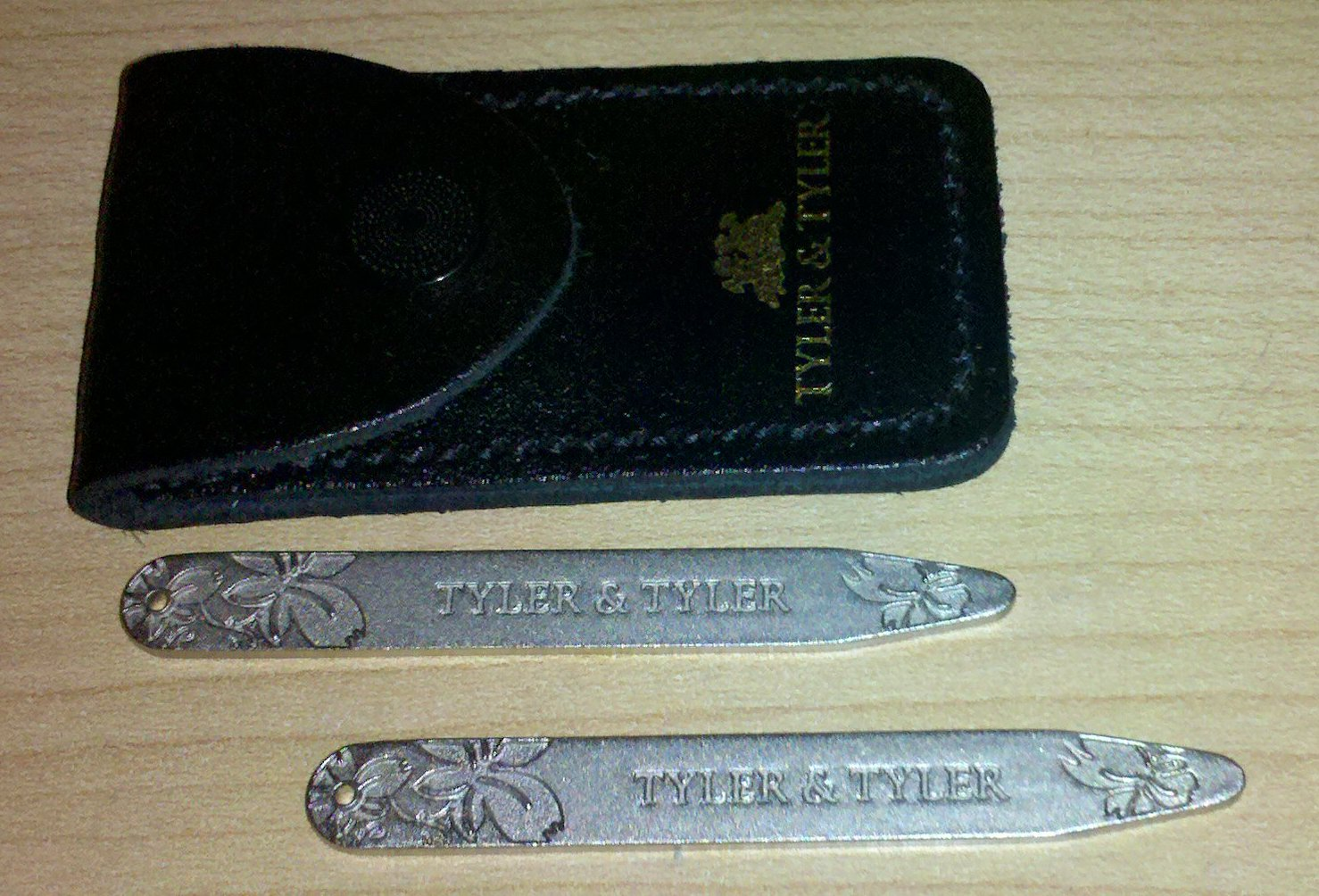
Metal collar stays are often used to replace plastic ones.

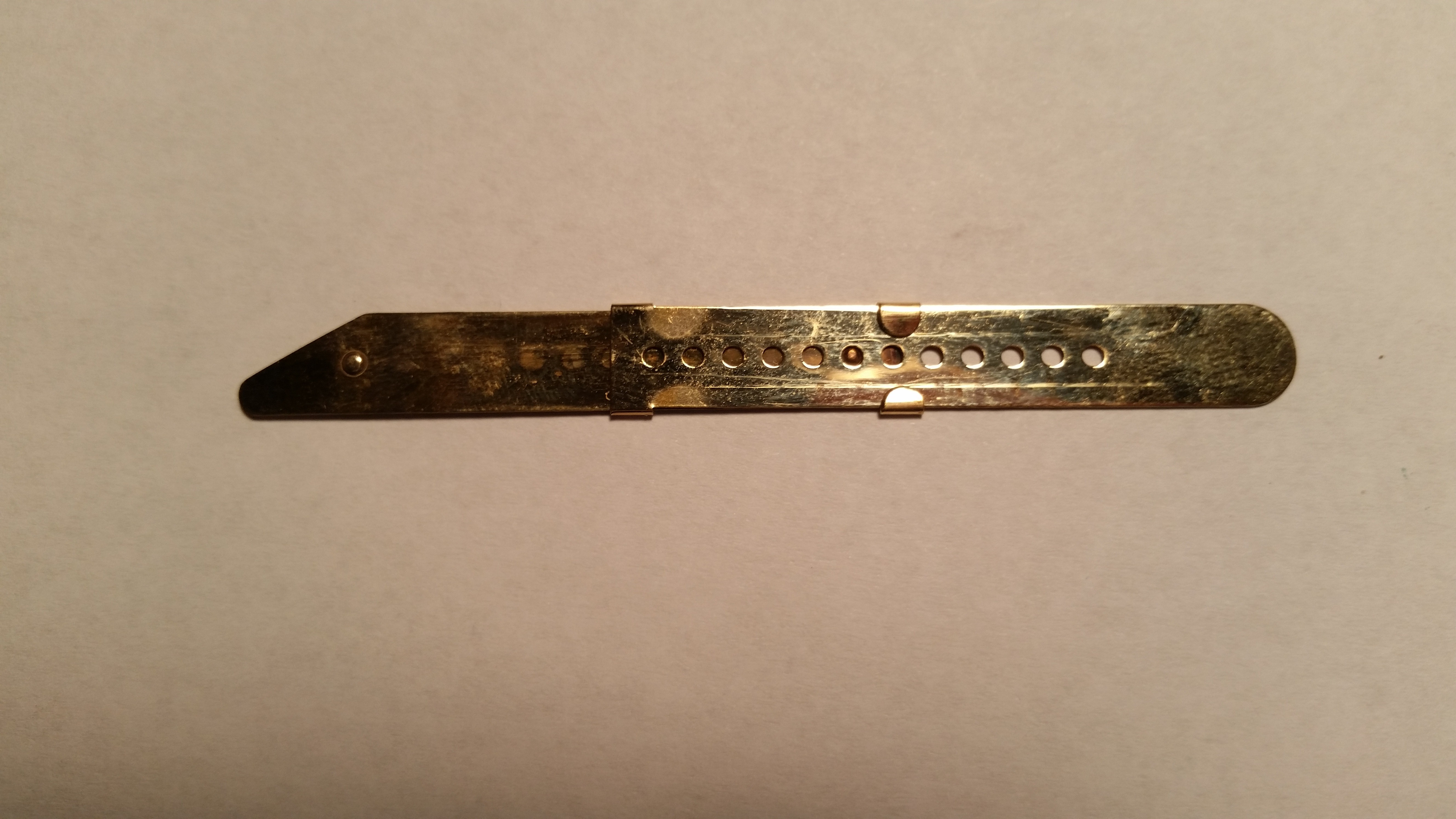
Adjustable-length collar stay

A collar stay, collar stick, collar bone (British English), collar tab (British English), collar stiffener, or collar stiff is a shirt accessory consisting of a smooth strip of rigid material, rounded at one end and pointed at the other, inserted into specially made pockets on the underside of a shirt collar to stabilize the collar's points. The stays ensure that the collar lies flat against the collarbone, looking crisp and remaining in the correct place.

Collar stays can be made from a variety of materials, including metal (such as brass, stainless steel, or sterling silver), horn, baleen, mother of pearl, or plastic. Shirts often come with plastic stays that may eventually need to be replaced if they bend; metal replacements do not have this problem.

Collar stays can be found in haberdashers, fabric- and sewing-supply stores and men's clothing stores. They are manufactured in multiple lengths to fit different collar designs, or may be designed with a means to adjust the length of the collar stay.

There are many variations to the traditional collar stay. Some metallic collar stays are sold with a magnet, which is used to hold the stiffened collar in place against the shirt. A different type of collar stay discreetly adds a button hook on one end, to help fasten tiny buttons on dress shirts; e.g. placket, cuffs or button down collars. Adhesive collar stays can be stuck to the underside of a collar to either add stiffness or attach the collar points to the shirt.

Collar stays are removed from shirts before dry cleaning or pressing, as the cleaning process can damage both the shirt and the stays; they are replaced prior to wearing. Shirts that are press ironed with the collar stays are vulnerable to damage, as this results in a telltale impression of the collar stay in the fabric of the collar. Some shirts have stays which are sewn into the collar and are not removable.

Some dress shirts are sold with shorter, wider stays than the classic shirt stay (e.g., Tommy Hilfiger). The classic stay will not work with these shirts.
