= Polo shirt =

Type of shirt

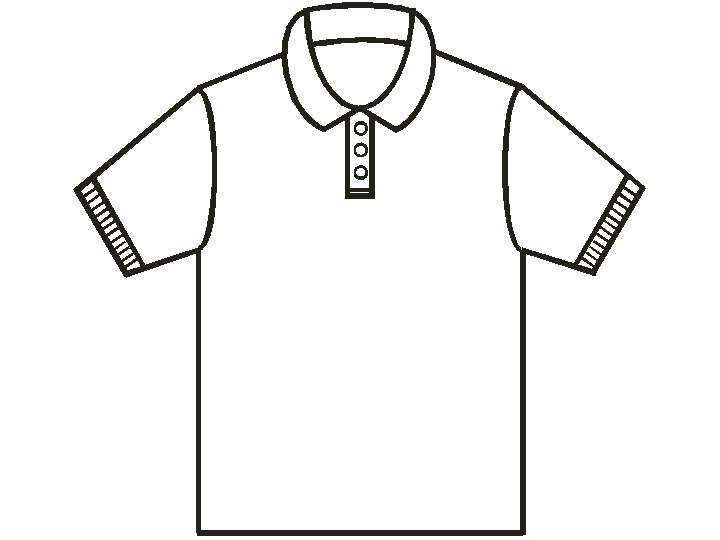
Polo shirt outline

A polo shirt, tennis shirt, golf shirt, or chukker shirt is a form of shirt with a collar. Polo shirts are usually short sleeved but can be long; they were used by polo players originally in British India in 1859 and in Great Britain during the 1920s.

Polo shirts are usually made of knitted cotton (rather than woven cloth), usually a piqué knit, or less commonly an interlock knit (the latter used frequently, though not exclusively, with pima cotton polos), or using other fibers such as silk, wool, synthetic fibers, or blends of natural and synthetic fibers. A dress-length version of the shirt is called a polo dress.

== History of the tennis shirt ==
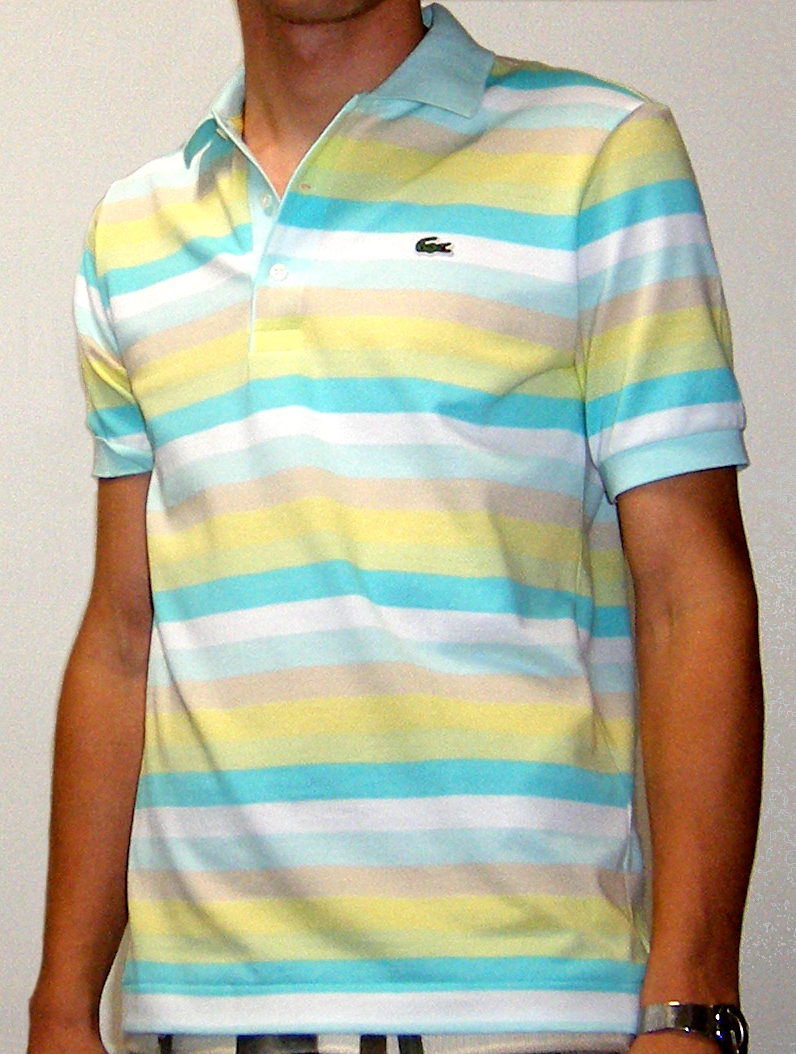
A Lacoste tennis shirt

In the 19th and early 20th centuries, tennis players ordinarily wore "tennis whites" consisting of long-sleeved white button-up shirts (worn with the sleeves rolled up), flannel trousers, and ties. This attire presented problems for ease of play and comfort.

René Lacoste, the French seven-time Grand Slam tennis champion, felt that the stiff tennis attire was too cumbersome and uncomfortable. He designed a white, short-sleeved shirt of loosely-knit piqué cotton (he called the cotton weave jersey petit piqué) with an unstarched, flat, protruding collar; a buttoned placket; and a shirt-tail longer in back than in front (known today as a "tennis tail"; see below), which he first wore at the 1926 U.S. Open championship.

Beginning in 1927, Lacoste placed a crocodile emblem on the left breast of his shirts, as the American press had begun to refer to him as "The Crocodile", a nickname which he embraced.

Lacoste's design mitigated the problems that traditional tennis attire created:

- the short, cuffed sleeves solved the tendency of long sleeves to roll down
- the shirt should be buttoned to the top
- the piqué collar could be worn upturned to protect the neck skin from the sun
- the jersey knit piqué cotton breathed and was more durable
- the "tennis tail" prevented the shirt from pulling out of the wearer's trousers or shorts

In 1933, after retiring from professional tennis, Lacoste teamed up with André Gillier, a friend who was a clothing merchandiser, to market that shirt in Europe and North America. Together, they formed the company Chemise Lacoste, and began selling their shirts, which included the small embroidered crocodile logo on the left breast.

== Application to polo ==
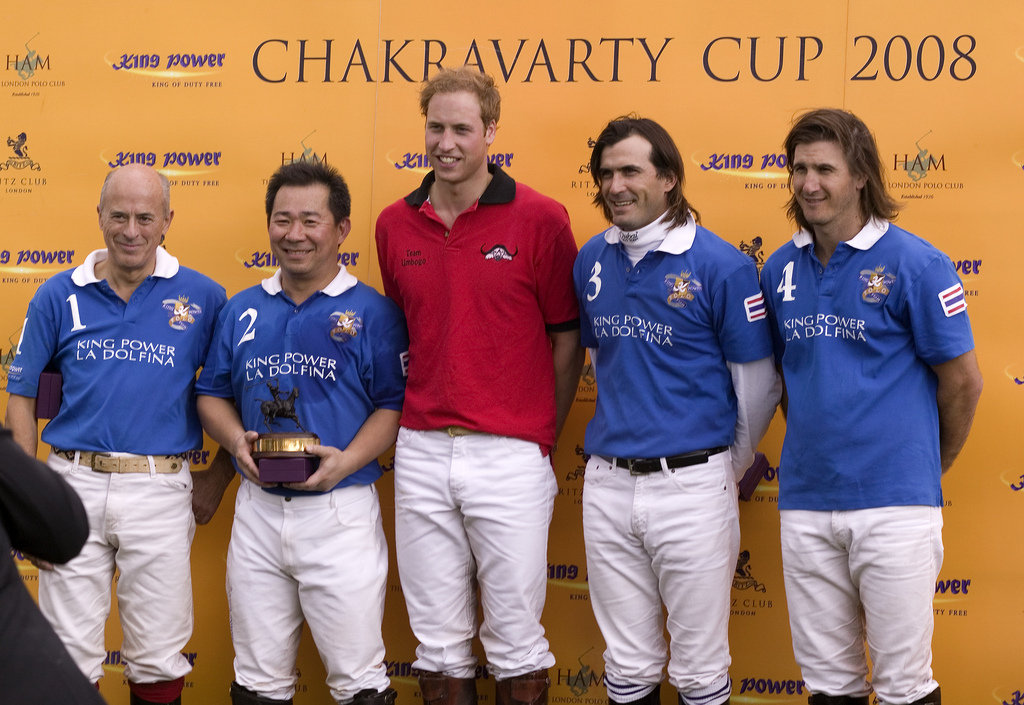
Polo players Paul Barr, Vichai Srivaddhanaprabha, Adolfo Cambiaso, Martin Valent with fellow player Prince William (center), wearing polo shirts as part of their uniform.

Until the beginning of 20th century, polo players wore thick, long-sleeved shirts made of Oxford-cloth cotton. This shirt was the first to have a buttoned-down collar, which polo players invented in the late 19th century to keep their collars from flapping in the wind. Brooks Brothers' early president, John Brooks, noticed this while at a polo match in England and began producing such a shirt in 1896. Brooks Brothers still produces this style of button-down "polo shirt".

In 1920, Lewis Lacey, a Canadian haberdasher and polo player born to English parents in Montreal, Quebec, in 1887, began producing a shirt that was embroidered with an emblem of a polo player, a design originating at the Hurlingham Polo Club near Buenos Aires.

In 1972, Ralph Lauren marketed a tennis shirt as a "polo shirt" as a prominent part of his original line Polo, thereby helping further its already widespread popularity. While not specifically designed for use by polo players, Lauren's shirt imitated what by that time had become the normal attire for polo players. As he desired to exude a certain "WASPishness" in his clothes, initially adopting the style of clothiers like Brooks Brothers, J. Press, and "Savile Row"-style English clothing, he prominently included this attire from the "sport of kings" in his line, replete with a logo reminiscent of Lacoste's crocodile emblem, depicting a polo player and pony.

In large part due to Ralph Lauren (and arguably as an example of a genericized trademark), the term “polo shirt,” has become far more common than “tennis shirt” or “golf shirt.”

== Golf ==
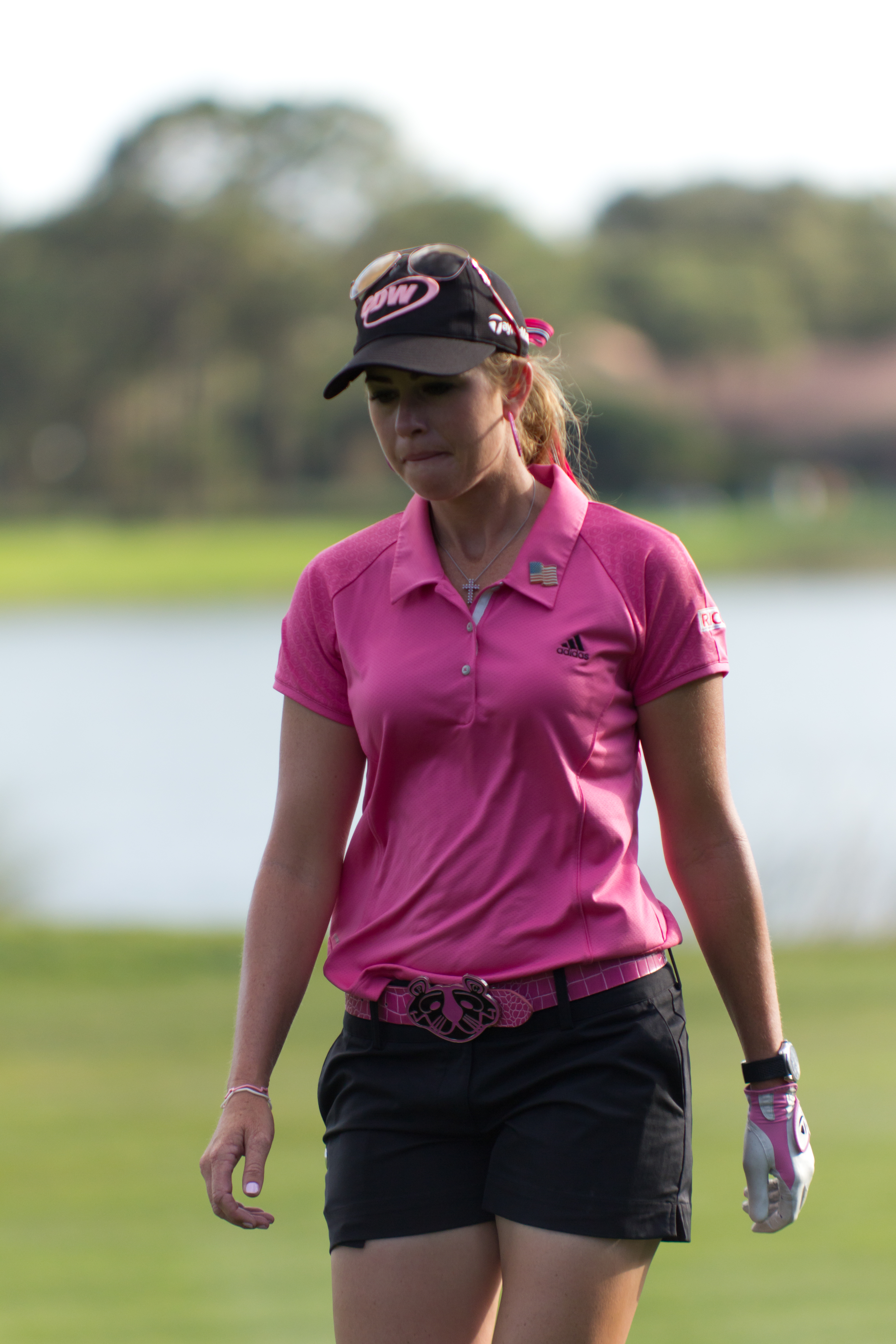
Paula Creamer wearing a golf polo.

Over the latter half of the 20th century, as standard clothing in golf became more casual, the tennis shirt was adopted nearly universally as standard golf attire. Many golf courses and country clubs require players to wear golf shirts as a part of their dress code. Moreover, producing Lacoste's "tennis shirt" in various golf cuts has resulted in specific designs of the tennis shirt for golf, resulting in the moniker golf shirt.

Golf shirts are commonly made out of polyester, cotton-polyester blends, or mercerized cotton. The placket typically holds three or four buttons, and consequently extends lower than the typical polo neckline. The collar is typically fabricated using a stitched double-layer of the same fabric used to make the shirt, in contrast to a polo shirt collar, which is usually one-ply ribbed knit cotton. Golf shirts often have a pocket on the left side, originally designed to hold small items such as a scorepad and pencil.

== In Vietnam ==
Polo shirts, known as áo thun có cổ in Vietnamese, were introduced to Vietnam in the early 20th century by the colonising French. Initially, polo shirts were worn by the upper class and athletes, but were gradually popular and widely accepted by all social classes. Many Vietnamese companies and businesses choose polo shirts as their employee uniforms. According to Metric.vn, the Vietnamese polo shirt market on e-commerce platforms reached 9.2 billion VND in 2023, a decrease of 19.3% compared to the previous quarter. Polo shirts account for about 20% of the Vietnamese t-shirt market, equivalent to 1.84 billion VND. In 2023, Vietnam exported 3.2 billion USD worth of t-shirts of all kinds, of which polo shirts accounted for about 20%, equivalent to US$640 million.

== See also ==
- Rugby shirt
- Sportswear (activewear)
