= Shirt =

Garment for the upper body

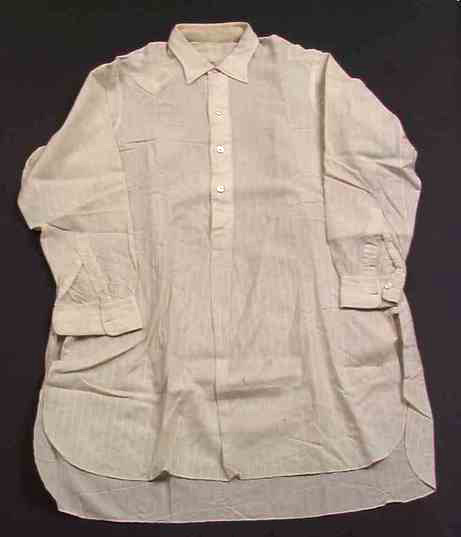
- Charvet shirt from the 1930s Norsk Folkemuseum, Oslo, Norway
- Type: Clothing
- Material: Materials uses: Cotton; Polyester; Linen; Silk; Wool; Denim; Flannel; Chambray
- Place of origin: Egypt

A shirt is a cloth garment for the upper body (from the neck to the waist).

Originally an undergarment worn exclusively by men, it has become, in American English, a catch-all term for a broad variety of upper-body garments and undergarments. In British English, a shirt is more specifically a garment with a collar, sleeves with cuffs, and a full vertical opening with buttons or snaps (North Americans would call that a "dress shirt", a specific type of collared shirt). A shirt can also be worn with a necktie under the shirt collar.

== History ==
The world's oldest preserved garment, discovered by Flinders Petrie, is a "highly sophisticated" linen shirt from a First Dynasty Egyptian tomb at Tarkan, dated to c. 3000 BC: "the shoulders and sleeves have been finely pleated to give form-fitting trimness while allowing the wearer room to move. The small fringe formed during weaving along one edge of the cloth has been placed by the designer to decorate the neck opening and side seam."

The shirt was an item of clothing that only men could wear as underwear, until the twentieth century. Although the women's chemise was a closely related garment to the men's, it is the men's garment that became the modern shirt. In the Middle Ages, it was a plain, undyed garment worn next to the skin and under regular garments. In medieval artworks, the shirt is only visible (uncovered) on humble characters, such as shepherds, prisoners, and penitents. In the seventeenth century, men's shirts were allowed to show, with much the same erotic import as visible underwear today. In the eighteenth century, instead of underpants, men "relied on the long tails of shirts ... to serve the function of drawers. Eighteenth-century costume historian Joseph Strutt believed that men who did not wear shirts to bed were indecent. Even as late as 1879, a visible shirt with nothing over it was considered improper.

The shirt sometimes had frills at the neck or cuffs. In the sixteenth century, men's shirts often had embroidery, and sometimes frills or lace at the neck and cuffs and through the eighteenth-century long neck frills, or jabots, were fashionable. Coloured shirts began to appear in the early nineteenth century, as can be seen in the paintings of George Caleb Bingham. They were considered casual wear, for lower-class workers only, until the twentieth century. For a gentleman, "to wear a sky-blue shirt was unthinkable in 1860, but had become standard by 1920 and, in 1980, constituted the most commonplace event."

European and American women began wearing shirts in 1860, when the Garibaldi shirt, a red shirt as worn by the freedom fighters under Giuseppe Garibaldi, was popularized by Empress Eugénie of France. At the end of the nineteenth century, the Century Dictionary described an ordinary shirt as "of cotton, with linen bosom, wristbands and cuffs prepared for stiffening with starch, the collar and wristbands being usually separate and adjustable".

The first documented appearance of the expression "To give the shirt off one's back", happened in 1771 as an idiom that indicates extreme desperation or generosity and is still in common usage. In 1827 Hannah Montague, a housewife in upstate New York, invents the detachable collar. Tired of constantly washing her husband's entire shirt when only the collar needed it, she cut off his collars and devised a way of attaching them to the neckband after washing. It was not until the 1930s that collar stays became popular, although these early accessories resembled tie clips more than the small collar stiffeners available today. They connected the collar points to the necktie, keeping them in place.

== Types ==
Three types of shirt

- Aloha shirt
- Camp shirt – a loose, straight-cut, short sleeved shirt or blouse with a simple placket front-opening and a "camp collar".
- Dress shirt – shirt with a formal (somewhat stiff) collar, a full-length opening at the front from the collar to the hem (usually buttoned), and sleeves with cuffs
- White shirt – usually dress shirt which is white in colour
  - Dinner shirt – a shirt specifically made to be worn with male evening wear, e.g. a black tie or white tie.
  - Guayabera – an embroidered dress shirt with four pockets.
- Poet shirt – a loose-fitting shirt or blouse with full bishop sleeves, usually with large frills on the front and on the cuffs.
- T-shirt – also "tee shirt", a casual shirt without a collar or buttons, made of a stretchy, finely knit fabric, usually cotton, and usually short-sleeved. Originally worn under other shirts, it is now a common shirt for everyday wear in some countries.
  - Long-sleeved T-shirt – a T-shirt with long sleeves that extend to cover the arms.
  - Ringer T-shirt – tee with a separate piece of fabric sewn onto the collar and sleeve hems.
  - Raglan T-shirt – a T-shirt with a raglan sleeve; a sleeve that extends in one piece fully to the collar, leaving a diagonal seam from underarm to collarbone.
  - Halfshirt – a high-hemmed T-shirt, typically falling between the bottom of the sternum and navel.
  - Sleeveless shirt – a shirt manufactured without sleeves, or one whose sleeves have been cut off, also called a tank top
    - A-shirt or vest or singlet (in British English) – essentially a sleeveless shirt with large armholes and a large neck hole, often worn by labourers or athletes for increased movability.
    - Camisole – woman's undershirt with narrow straps, or a similar garment worn alone (often with bra). Also referred to as a cami, shelf top, spaghetti straps or strappy top
- Polo shirt (also tennis shirt or golf shirt) – a pullover soft collar short-sleeved shirt with an abbreviated button placket at the neck and a longer back than front (the "tennis tail").
  - Rugby shirt – a long-sleeved polo shirt, traditionally of rugged construction in thick cotton or wool, but often softer today
  - Henley shirt – a collarless polo shirt
- Baseball shirt (jersey) – usually distinguished by a three-quarters sleeve, team insignia, and flat waist seam
- Sweatshirt – long-sleeved athletic shirt of heavier material, with or without hood
- Tunic – primitive shirt, distinguished by two-piece construction. Initially a men's garment, is normally seen in modern times being worn by women
- Shirtwaist – historically (circa. 1890–1920) a woman's tailored shirt (also called a "tailored waist") cut like a man's dress shirt; in contemporary usage, a woman's dress cut like a men's dress shirt to the waist, then extended into dress length at the bottom
- Nightshirt – often oversized, ruined or inexpensive light cloth undergarment shirt for sleeping.
- Halter top – a shoulderless, sleeveless garment for women. It is mechanically analogous to an apron with a string around the back of the neck and across the lower back holding it in place.
- Top shirt – a long-sleeved collarless polo shirt
- Heavy shirt – a shirt made with heavier fabric (typically more than 6 oz./yd.², often ranging from 6 oz. to 9 oz.+, or 180 to 220 GSM)
- Onesie or diaper shirt – a shirt for infants which is buttoned in the front between the legs
- Tube top (in American English) or boob tube (in British English) – a shoulderless, sleeveless "tube" that wraps the torso not reaching higher than the armpit, staying in place by elasticity or by a single strap that is attached to the front of the tube
- Overshirt- a heavier type of shirt that can be worn over the shirt as a jacket.
- Thousand-miler shirt - historically (until circa 1960s) a light brown colored shirt worn predominantly by American travelling salesmen in first half of 20th century and known as a thousand-miler because it did not show dirt from long business trips on the road. Also a dark shirt or one made of heavy serviceable fabric as worn by sailors or railway workers especially during the steam age.
- Punishment shirts were special shirts made for the condemned, either those cursed supernaturally, such as the poisoned shirt that killed Creusa (daughter of Creon), the Shirt of Nessus used to kill Hercules, those used to execute people in ancient Rome, such as the Tunica molesta, and those used in church heresy trials such as the Sanbenito

== Parts of shirt ==
Many terms are used to describe and differentiate types of shirts (and upper-body garments in general) and their construction. The smallest differences may have significance to a cultural or occupational group. Recently, (late twentieth century, into the twenty-first century) it has become common to use tops as a form of advertisement. Many of these distinctions apply to other upper-body garments, such as coats and sweaters.

=== Shoulders and arms ===
==== Sleeves ====
Shirts may:

- have no covering of the shoulders or arms – a tube top (not reaching higher than the armpits, staying in place by elasticity)
- have only shoulder straps, such as spaghetti straps
- cover the shoulders, but without sleeves
- have shoulderless sleeves, short or long, with or without shoulder straps, that expose the shoulders, but cover the rest of the arm from the biceps and triceps down to at least the elbow
- have short sleeves, varying from cap sleeves (covering only the shoulder and not extending below the armpit) to half sleeves (elbow length), with some having quarter-length sleeves (reaching to a point that covers half of the biceps and triceps area)
- have three-quarter-length sleeves (reaching to a point between the elbow and the wrist)
- have long sleeves (reaching a point to the wrist to a little beyond wrist)

==== Cuffs ====
Shirts with long sleeves may further be distinguished by the cuffs:

- no buttons – a closed placket cuff
- buttons (or analogous fasteners such as snaps) – single or multiple. A single button or pair aligned parallel with the cuff hem is considered a button cuff. Multiple buttons aligned perpendicular to the cuff hem, or parallel to the placket constitute a barrel cuff.
- buttonholes designed for cufflinks
  - a French cuff, where the end half of the cuff is folded over the cuff itself and fastened with a cufflink. This type of cuff has four buttons and a short placket.
  - more formally, a link cuff – fastened like a French cuff, except is not folded over, but instead hemmed, at the edge of the sleeve.
- asymmetrical designs, such as one-shoulder, one-sleeve or with sleeves of different lengths.

=== Lower hem ===
- hanging to the waist
- leaving the belly button area bare (much more common for women than for men). See halfshirt.
- covering the crotch
- covering part of the legs (essentially this is a dress; however, a piece of clothing is perceived either as a shirt (worn with trousers) or as a dress (in Western culture mainly worn by women)).
- going to the floor (as a pajama shirt)

=== Body ===
- vertical opening on the front side, all the way down, with buttons or zipper. When fastened with buttons, this opening is often called the placket front.
- similar opening, but in back.
- left and right front side not separable, put on over the head; with regard to upper front side opening:
  - V-shaped permanent opening on the top of the front side
  - no opening at the upper front side
  - vertical opening on the upper front side with buttons or zipper
    - men's shirts are usually buttoned on the right whereas women's are usually buttoned on the left.

=== Neck ===
- with polo-neck
- with "scoop" neck
- with v-neck but no collar
- with plunging neck
- with open or tassel neck
- with collar
  - windsor collar or spread collar – a dressier collar designed with a wide distance between points (the spread) to accommodate the windsor knot tie. The standard business collar.
  - tab collar – a collar with two small fabric tabs that fasten together behind a tie to maintain collar spread.
  - wing collar – best suited for the bow tie, often only worn for very formal occasions.
  - straight collar – or point collar, a version of the windsor collar that is distinguished by a narrower spread to better accommodate the four-in-hand knot, pratt knot, and the half-windsor knot. A moderate dress collar.
  - button-down collar – A collar with buttons that fasten the points or tips to a shirt. The most casual of collars worn with a tie.
  - band collar – essentially the lower part of a normal collar, first used as the original collar to which a separate collarpiece was attached. Rarely seen in modern fashion. Also casual.
  - turtle neck collar – A collar that covers most of the throat.
- without collar
    - V-neck no collar – The neckline protrudes down the chest and to a point, creating a "V"-looking neckline.

=== Other features ===
- pockets – how many (if any), where, and with regard to closure: not closable, just a flap, or with a button or zipper.
- with or without hood

Some combinations are not applicable, e.g. a tube top cannot have a collar.

== Measures and sizes ==
The main measures for a jacket are:

- Shoulders
- Bust
- Waist
- Hip
- Sleeve
- Length, from the neck to the waist or hip.

=== Sizes ===
- Asia Size M = US/EU Size XS.
- Asia Size L = US/EU Size S.
- Asia Size XL = US/EU Size M.
- Asia Size XXL = US/EU Size L.
- Asia Size XXXL = US/EU Size XL.
- Asia Size XXXXL = US/EU Size XXL.

== Types of fabric ==
There are two main categories of fibres used: natural fibre and man-made fibre (synthetics or petroleum based). Some natural fibres are linen, the first used historically, hemp, cotton, the most used, ramie, wool, silk and more recently bamboo or soya. Some synthetic fibres are polyester, tencel, viscose, etc. Polyester mixed with cotton (poly-cotton) is often used. Fabrics for shirts are called shirtings. The four main weaves for shirtings are plain weave, oxford, twill and satin. Broadcloth, poplin and end-on-end are variations of the plain weave. After weaving, finishing can be applied to the fabric.

== Shirts and politics ==
In the 1920s and 1930s, fascists wore different coloured shirts:

- Black shirts were used by the Italian fascists, and in Britain, Finland and Germany and Croatia.
- Brownshirts were worn by German Nazis of the SA.
- The Blueshirts was a fascist movement in Ireland and Canada, and the colour of the Portuguese Nacional Sindicalistas, the Spanish Falange Española, the French Solidarité Française, and the Chinese Blue Shirts Society.
- Green shirts were used in Hungary, Ireland, Romania, Brazil and Portugal.
- Camisas Doradas (golden shirts) were used in Mexico.
- Red shirts were worn by the racist and antisemitic Bulgarian Ratniks.
- Silver Shirts were worn in the United States of America.
- Grey shirts were worn by members of the Fatherland League in Norway.

In addition, red shirts have been used to symbolize a variety of different political groups, including Garibaldi's Italian revolutionaries, nineteenth-century American street gangs, and socialist militias in Spain and Mexico during the 1930s.

Different colored shirts signified the major opposing sides that featured prominently in the 2008 Thai political crisis, with red having been worn by the supporters of the populist People's Power Party (PPP), and yellow being worn by the supporters of the royalist and anti-Thaksin Shinawatra movement the People's Alliance for Democracy (PAD). Each side is commonly referred to as the 'red shirts' and 'yellow shirts' respectively, though the later opponents of the later Thaksin supporting groups have largely ceased wearing yellow shirts to protest rallies.

In the UK, the Social Credit movement of the thirties wore green shirts.

The party leaders of Dravidar Kazhagam in India wear only black shirts to symbolise atheism.

Whatever its color, the shirt itself means a certain wealth and social status. In Spain in the 19th century, then in Argentina during the time of Juan Perón, the word descamisados ("shirtless") means the masses of the poor.

== Industrial production ==
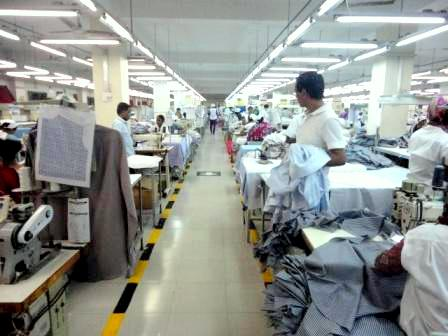
Shirt production line

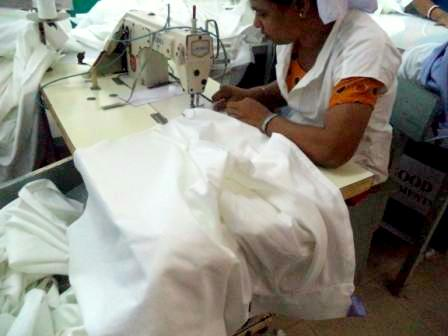
Factory sewing

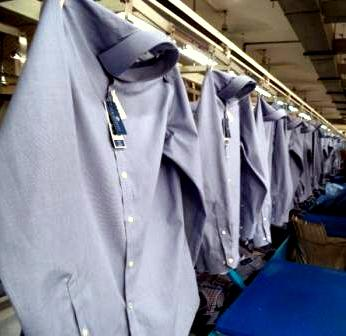
Shirts on a conveyor

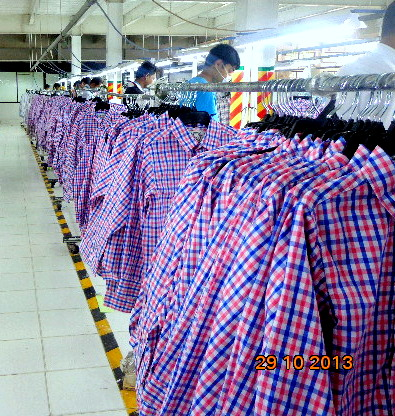
Shirts awaiting finishing

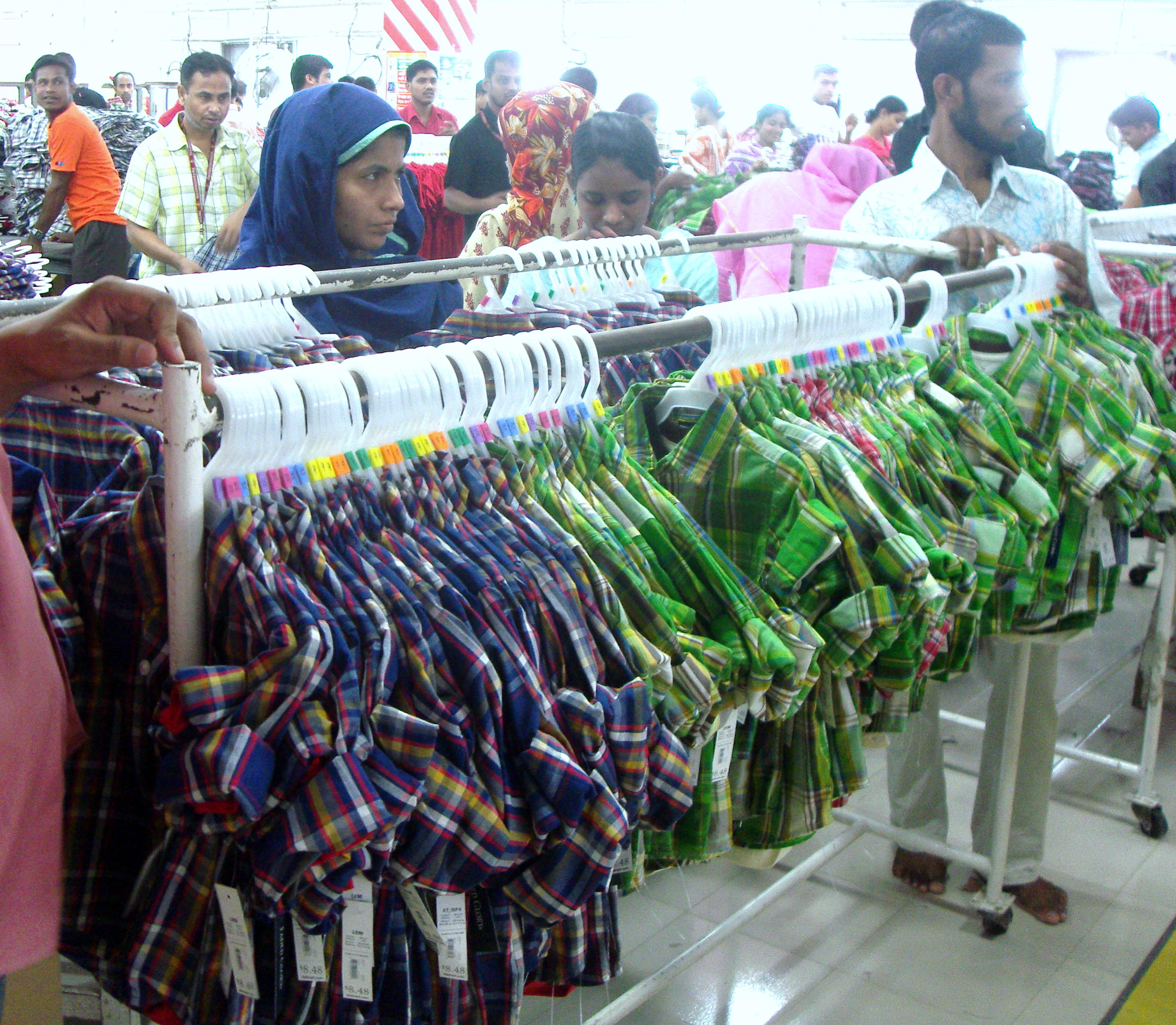
Kids shirts for quality checking

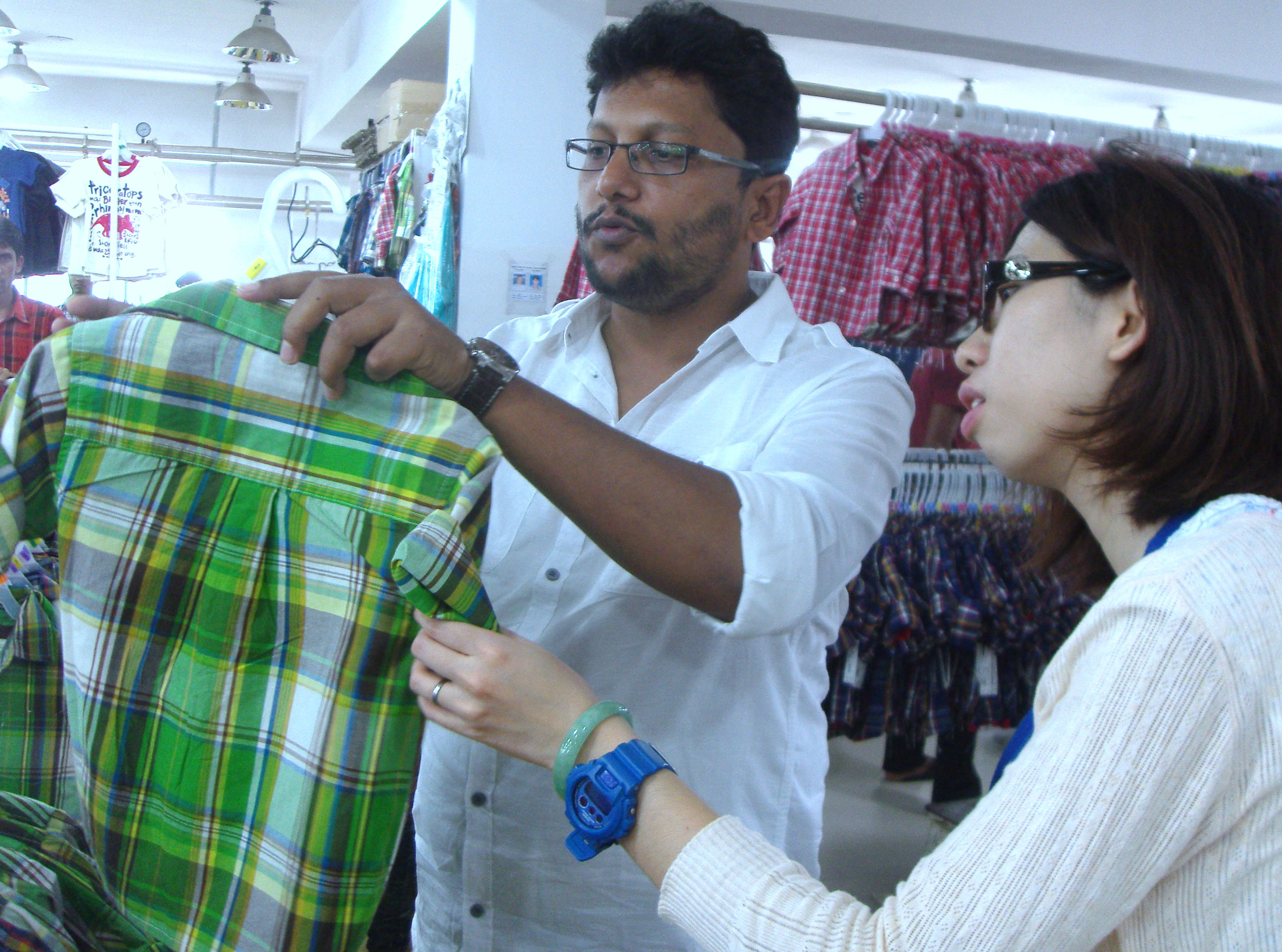
Manufacturer and buyer reviewing product

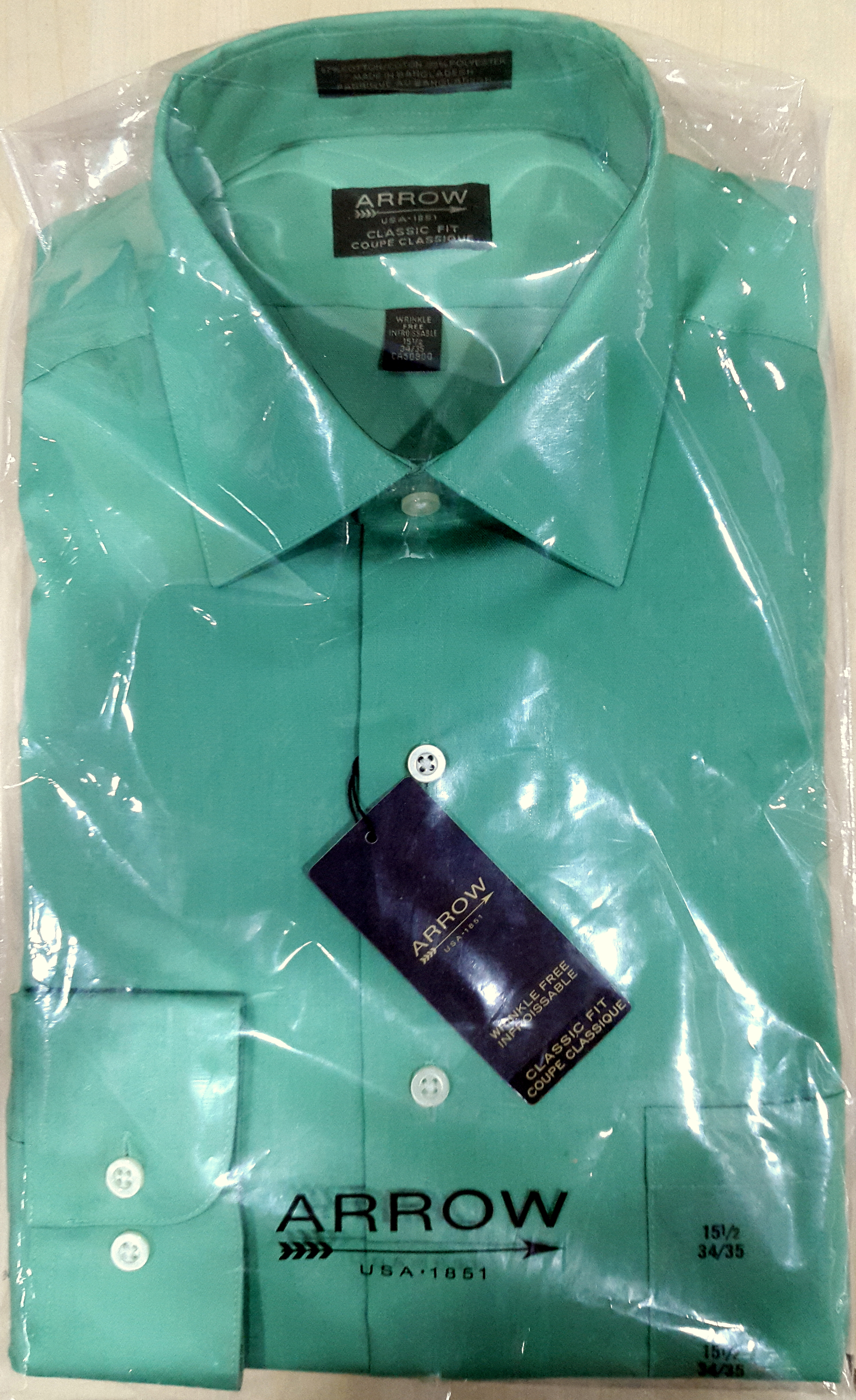
Dress shirt

== See also ==
- Cardigan (sweater)
- Descamisado
- Jermyn Street, home of the oldest English shirtmakers
