= Grandfather shirt =

Long-sleeved garment

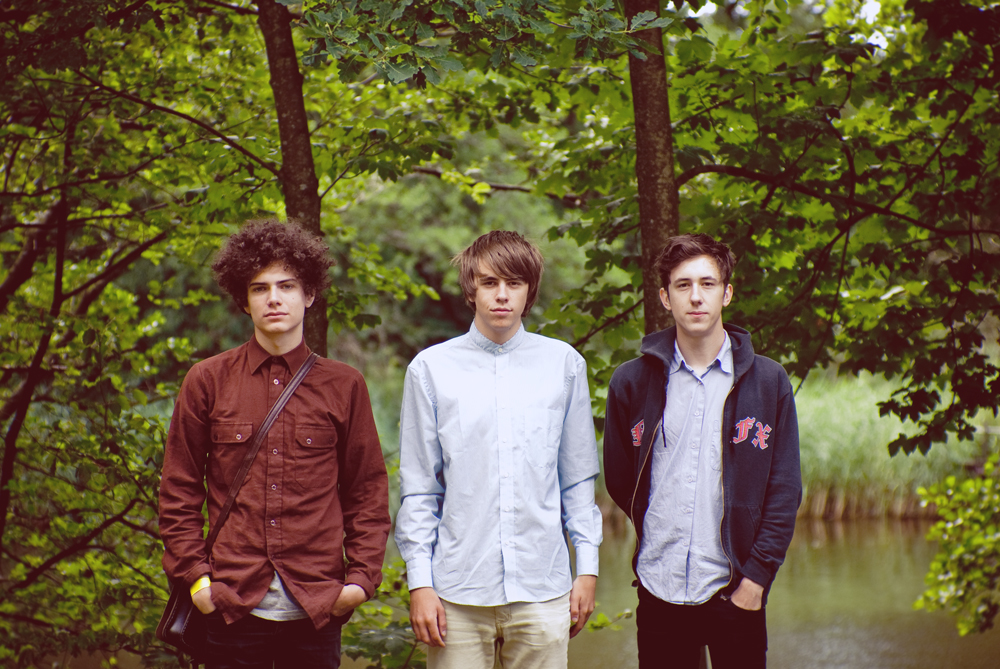
A Swedish teenager (centre) wearing grandad style shirt, 2008

A grandfather shirt or grandad shirt is a long-sleeved or short-sleeved flannel or brushed cotton collarless or band-collared shirt. In Ireland, the term "grandfather shirt" is typically applied to a collarless buttoned shirt. In Britain, a collarless shirt worn by the working class was sometimes known as a "union shirt". The shirts were traditionally plain white or white with coloured vertical stripes.

== Background ==
"Grandfather shirts", a band-collared shirt, were historically worn by labourers. The collar-less or band-collared style was favoured by labourers as a removable collar made for easier laundering and as stiff collars were uncomfortable and unneccecssary. Some sources suggest that the collar was removed by factory workers and labourers as collars and ties represented a safety hazard in industrial settings.

A similar style of collarless shirt, known as a "union shirt", was also worn by working-class men in Great Britain during the industrial era. At this period, the lack of a turndown or collar "cape" was filled by the use of a detachable collar or scarf, as access to laundered collars was difficult or unnecessary.

When worn with an attached/button-on collar, to "dress the shirt up", the collared grandfather shirt was colloquially known as a "Sunday Shirt". Longer shirts were sometimes worn as a nightshirt.

== Re-emergence ==
In the late 20th century, grandfather shirts were associated with the skinhead subculture in Britain. In the early decades of the 21st century, the garment featured as a mainstream fashion item for men. Some sources associate the trend with the British television series Peaky Blinders.

== See also ==
- Henley shirt, a collarless pullover shirt with a round neckline
- Kurta, a collarless shirt or tunic traditionally worn in the Islamic world and South Asia
- Polo neck, a snug roll-neck worn without a necktie. Originally worn when playing polo.
