= Camp shirt =

Loose, short-sleeved shirt or blouse

A camp shirt, variously known as a cabin shirt, Cuban collar shirt, cabana shirt, and lounge shirt, is a loose, straight-cut, woven, short-sleeved button-front shirt or blouse with a simple placket front opening and a "camp collar"–a one-piece collar (no band collar) that can be worn open and spread or closed at the neck with a button and loop. It usually has a straight hemmed bottom falling at hip level, not intended to be tucked into trousers.

While camp shirts are generally made from plain, single-color fabrics, variants include duo-tone bowling shirts and print patterned aloha shirts.

== See also ==
- Barong tagalog – Formal Filipino shirt made of pineapple fiber
- Batik – Indonesian and Malaysian shirt worn casually or as business attire
- Guayabera – Mexican, Central American, and Caribbean shirt worn casually or as business attire
- Kariyushi shirt – Okinawan shirt worn casually or as business attire
