= Untuckit =

American clothing company

Untuckit LLC
- Company type: Private
- Industry: Retail, Apparel, E-Commerce
- Founded: 2010; 16 years ago, in Hoboken, New Jersey
- Founders: Aaron Sanandres; Chris Riccobono
- Headquarters: SoHo, Manhattan, New York, United States
- Number of locations: 80 (November 2020)
- Areas served: United States; Canada; United Kingdom
- Website: untuckit.com

Untuckit LLC (styled as "UNTUCKit" in branding materials) is an American casual men's apparel company established in 2011 and headquartered in New York City. The company focuses on selling casual shirts that are designed not to be tucked into pants, and thus are cut a bit shorter than typical men's dress shirts. The first Untuckit brick-and-mortar store was opened in September 2015; as of today, the company now has 73 stores in various cities in North America and the United Kingdom. Its flagship store is located on Fifth Avenue in New York City.

== History ==
Chris Riccobono came up with the idea for Untuckit while working at GE Healthcare. In February 2011, he brought on Aaron Sanandres, a Columbia Business School classmate, to help develop the idea into a standalone business. Through a market survey, they established the length of their shirts to be halfway between the belt and the bottom of the zipper, allowing the front pockets of the pants to be slightly exposed.

Initially running the operation out of the third bedroom in Riccobono's apartment in Hoboken, New Jersey, and shipping out of a local storage unit Untuckit opened its first store in September 2015 in SoHo, Manhattan, New York (on Prince Street). In 2016, brick-and-mortar stores were opened in Chicago, Los Angeles Austin, Texas, and San Francisco. The company opened an additional 20 stores in 2017, including 3 additional stores in New York City, and opened an additional 26 stores in 2018. As of August 2019, the company has a total of 73 stores including its first international store at Sherway Gardens in Canada which opened on September 12, 2018.

== Products ==
Untuckit offers its products through its e-commerce site and brick-and-mortar stores. Their core product is men's casual shirts. Their product line includes button-down shirts, polos, tee shirts, henleys, vests, sweaters, sweatshirts, pants, outerwear, sports coats, shoes, and accessories. They also offer a women's clothing line, which was first launched in 2017.

== Press commentary ==
Untuckit was named a "Brand to Know" by Maxim. Reviewer Sean Hotchkiss, writing in GQ, referred to the length of the company's shirts as "perfection".

Untuckit has also been featured in other publications including The Wall Street Journal, Esquire, Men's Journal, Men's Health, and The Howard Stern Show.
