= Shirtdress =

Style of women's dress that borrows details from a man's shirt

A shirtdress is a style of women's dress that borrows details from a man's shirt. These can include a collar, a button front, or cuffed sleeves. Often, these dresses are made up in crisp fabrics including cotton or silk, much like a men's dress shirt would be. As they are typically cut without a seam at the waist, these dresses often have a looser fit, usually relying on a belt to define the waist. Button fronts and a forgiving fit make this a flattering look for most body types.

== History ==
Shirtdresses were sometimes called a "shirtwaist dress" when they were fashionable during the 1950s. The 1950s version of the shirtdress was launched as part of Christian Dior's post–World War II "New Look" couture designs, with a full skirt held up by wearing a crinoline. They often featured a notched collar, and elbow-length sleeves with cuffs. More informal versions of the shirtdress, made of cotton, but retaining the full skirt and collar, became a staple part of many women's wardrobes during the 1950s, with designers such as Anne Fogarty becoming known for their versions of this style. A 1957 issue of Life magazine includes a photo of a typical cotton shirtdress selling for $25 in New York City.

A variation of the original shirtdress is the "T-shirt dress". T-shirt dresses began being produced in the 1960s, and are simply an elongated version of a T-shirt.

== Image gallery ==
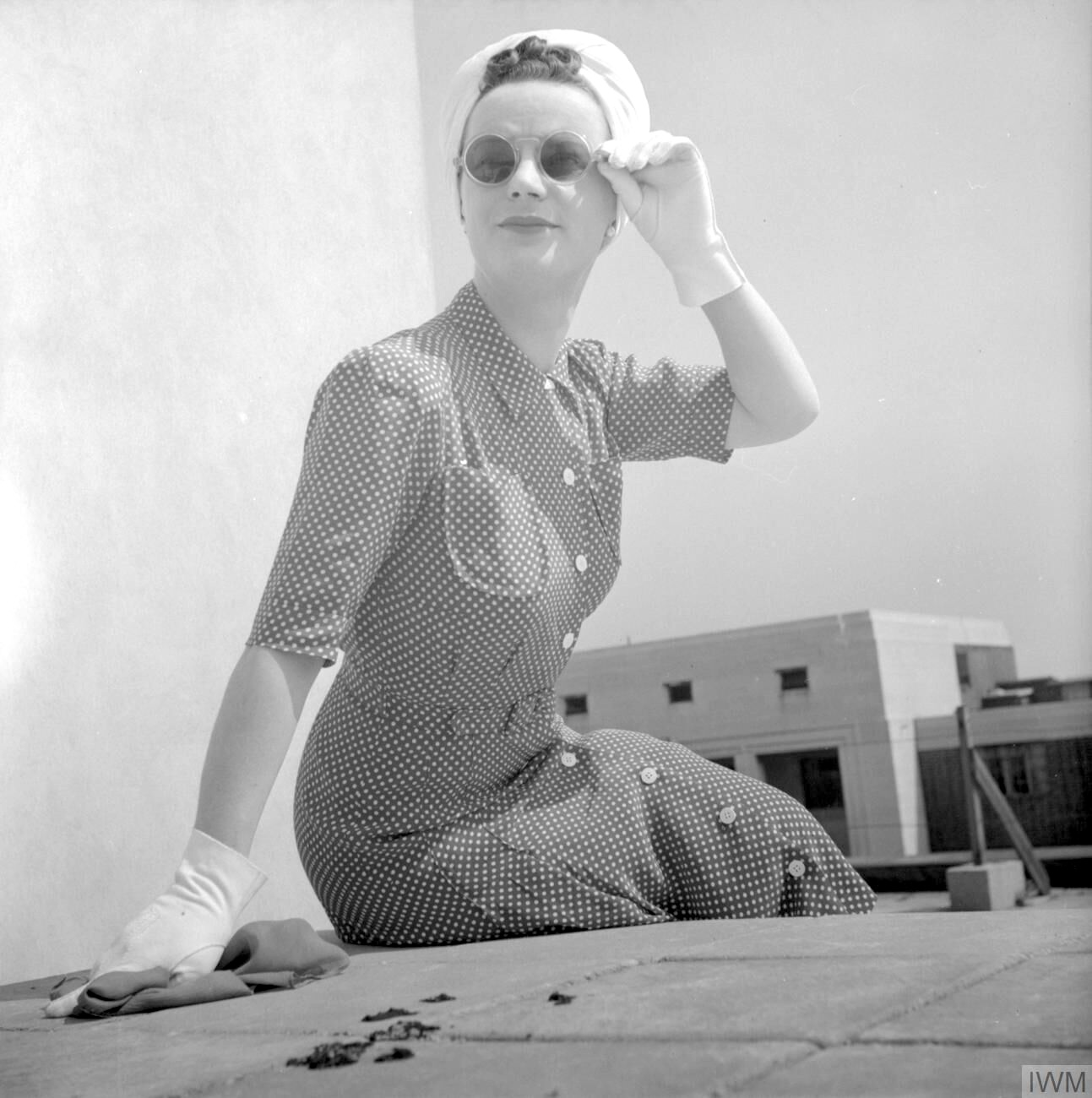
A 1943 shirtdress.

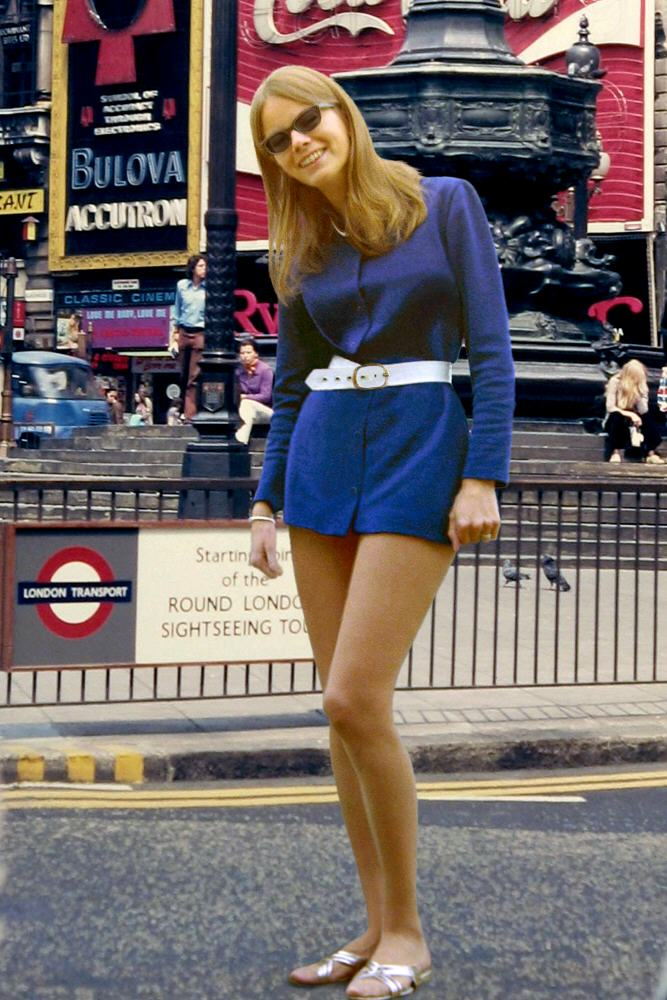
A shirtdress worn with a belt, 1970s.

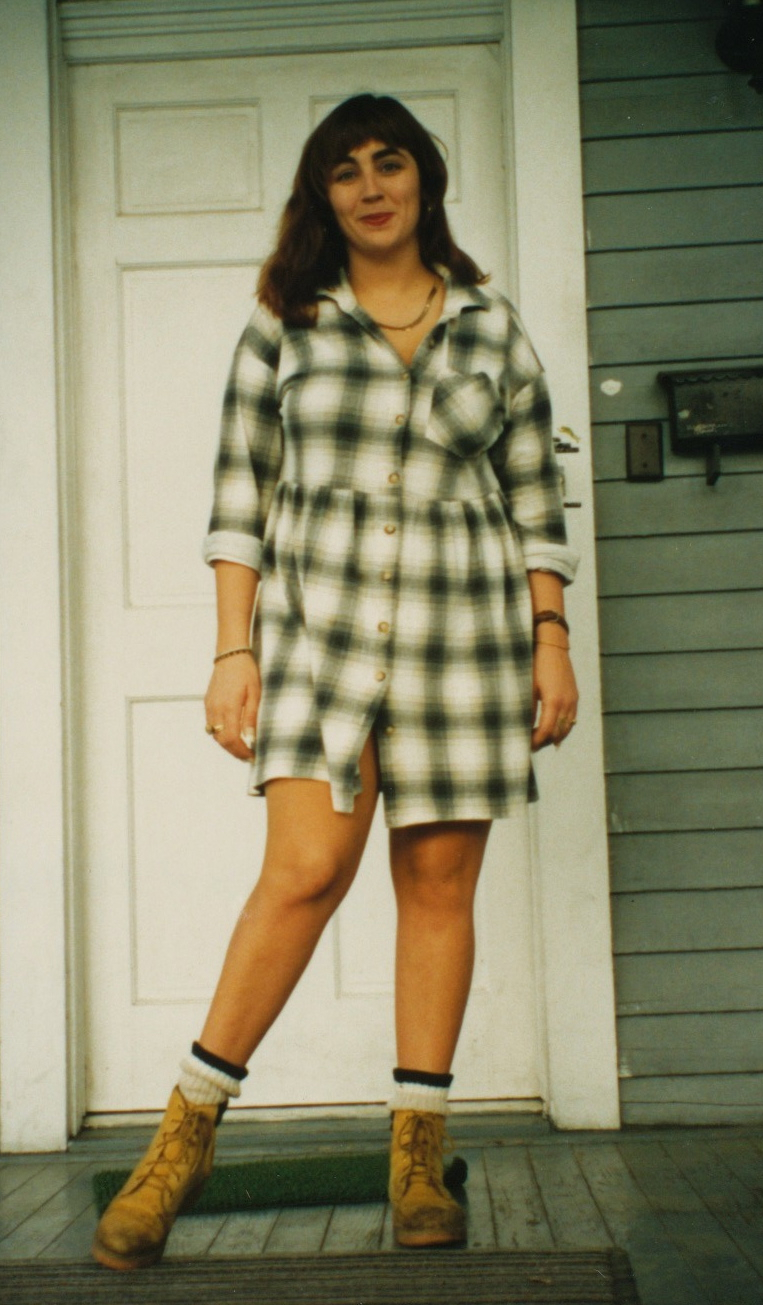
A 1990s shirtdress.

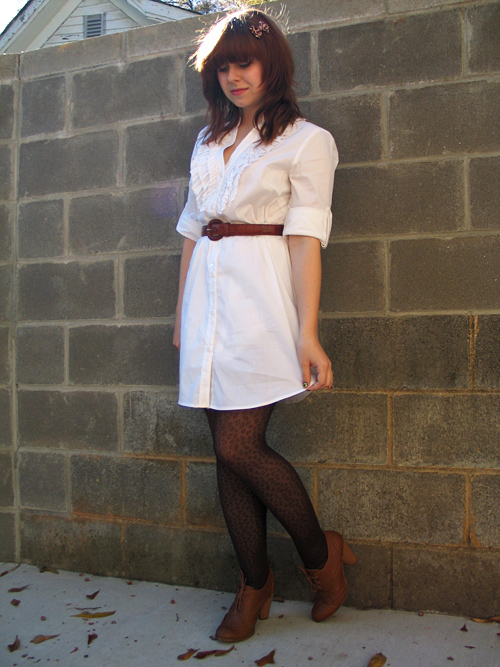
A shirtdress worn in 2011.

== See also ==
- 1940s in fashion
- 1950s in fashion
