= Collar pin =

Men's jewelry

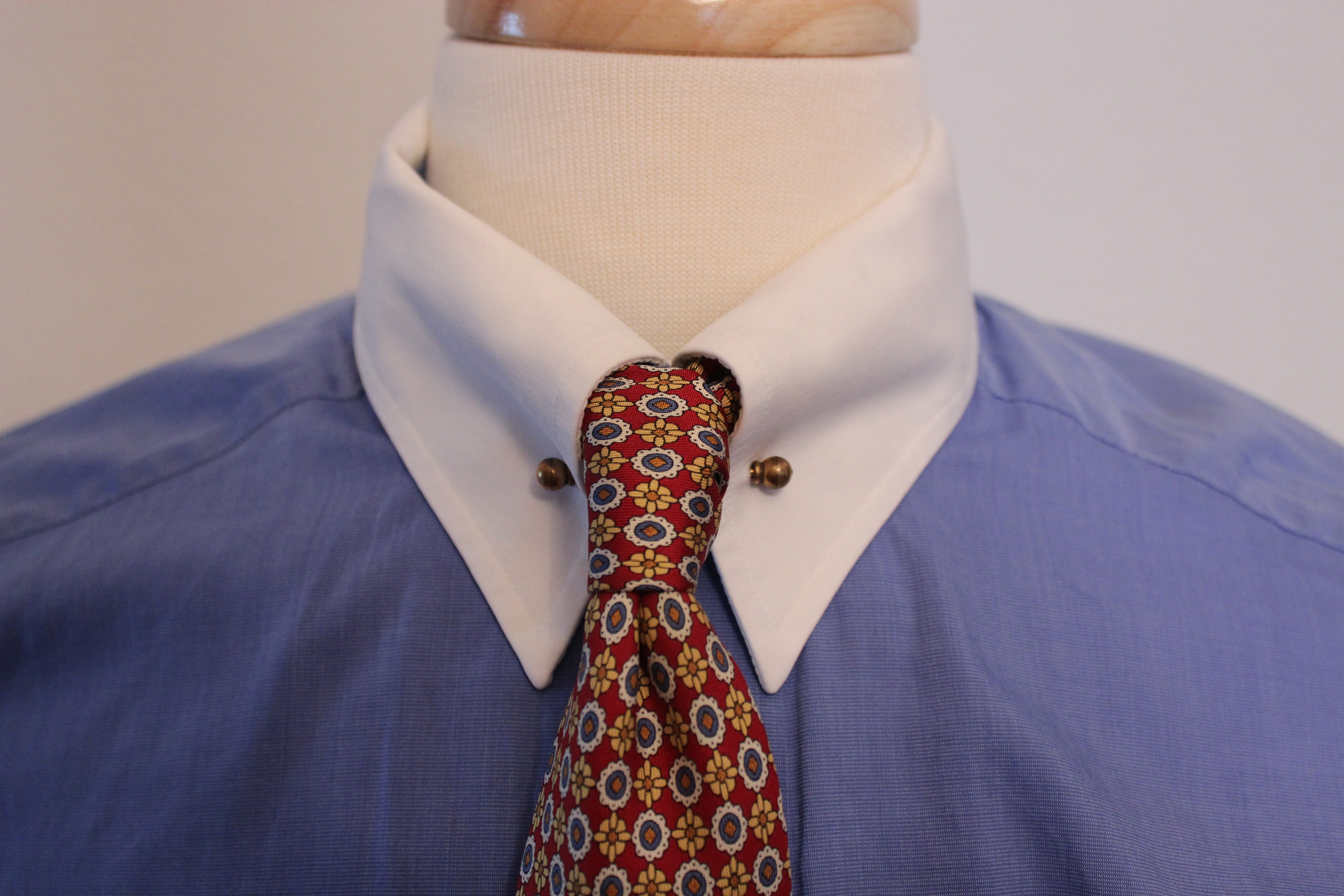
A collar pin

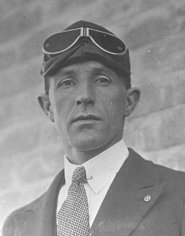
Norman Brearley, Australian aviation pioneer of the 1920s, wearing a collar pin.

A collar pin (closely related to the collar bar and collar clip) is a piece of men's jewelry, which holds the two ends of a dress shirt collar together and passes underneath the knot of a necktie. Functioning in a similar way as a tabbed collar, it keeps the collar in place and lifts the knot to provide a more aesthetically pleasing arc to the necktie.

== Types and use ==
A collar pin is between three and five centimeters in length and is one of three kinds:

- a collar bar or barbell whose ends screw off and is designed to pass through specially made eyelets in each side of the collar
- a pin, similar to a safety pin, that pierces each side of the collar (or passes through the existing eyelet)
- a bar with clips on both ends that grasp each side of the collar

The latter two styles do not require specially made collars, but collar bars are generally not worn with buttoned-down ("polo") collars and would be redundant with tabbed collars. Collar stays are not needed when using a collar bar. As a general matter, collar pins work best with straight, minimally spread collars; least, if at all, with spread collars; and not at all with widely spread collars such as the cutaway.
