= Laundry starch =

Polymer suspension

Laundry starch or clothing starch is a liquid suspension prepared by mixing a vegetable starch in water used in the laundering of clothes. In biochemistry, starch refers to a complex polymer derived from glucose, but in the context of laundry, the term "starch" refers to a suspension of this polymer that is used to stiffen clothing.

Starch was widely used in Europe in the 16th and 17th centuries to stiffen the wide collars and ruffs of fine linens that surrounded the necks of the well-to-do. During the 19th and early 20th century it was stylish to stiffen the collars and sleeves of men's shirts and the ruffles of women's petticoats by starching them before the clean clothes were ironed. Starch gave clothing smooth, crisp edges, and had an additional practical purpose: dirt and sweat from a person's neck and wrists would stick to the starch rather than to the fibers of the clothing. The dirt would wash away along with the starch; after laundering, the starch would be reapplied. Starch is available in spray cans, in addition to the usual granules to mix with water. The starch used in laundry is "pregelatinized". Similar products are used in metal casting and in pharmaceuticals.

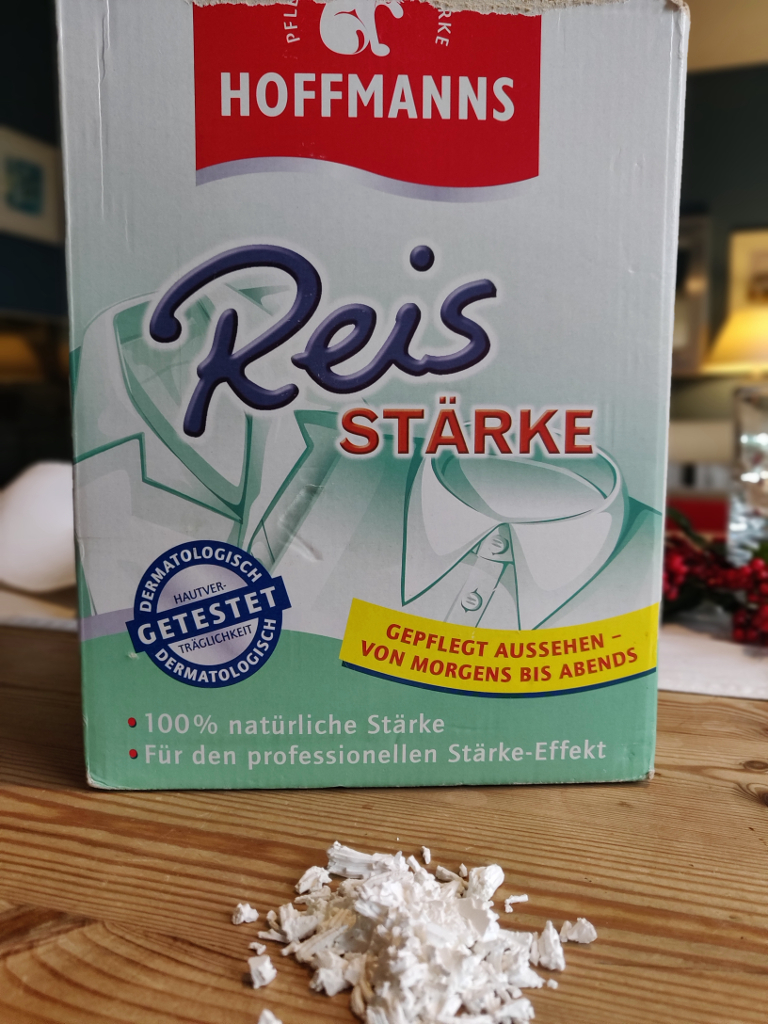
Rice starch for ironing

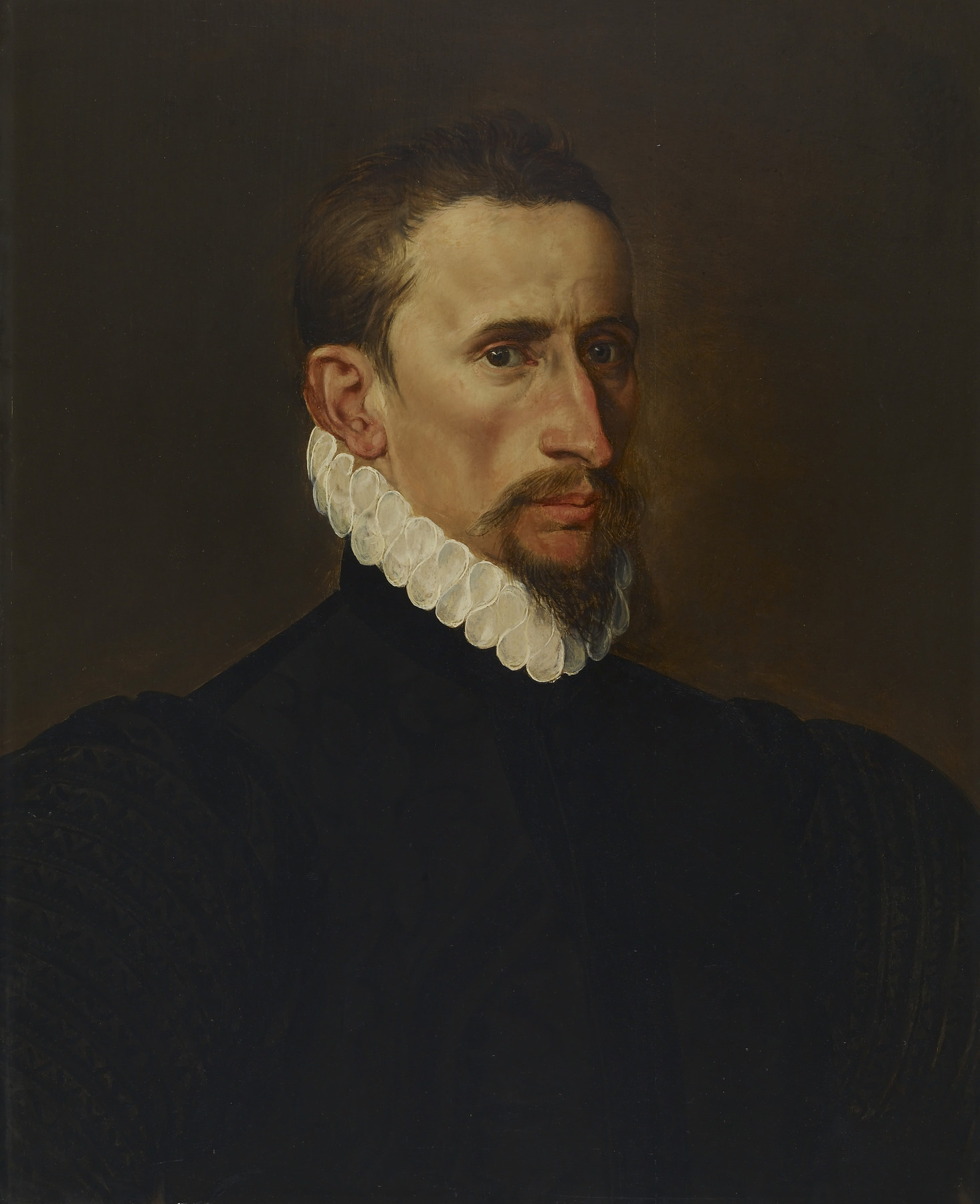
Gentleman with starched ruff, 1560

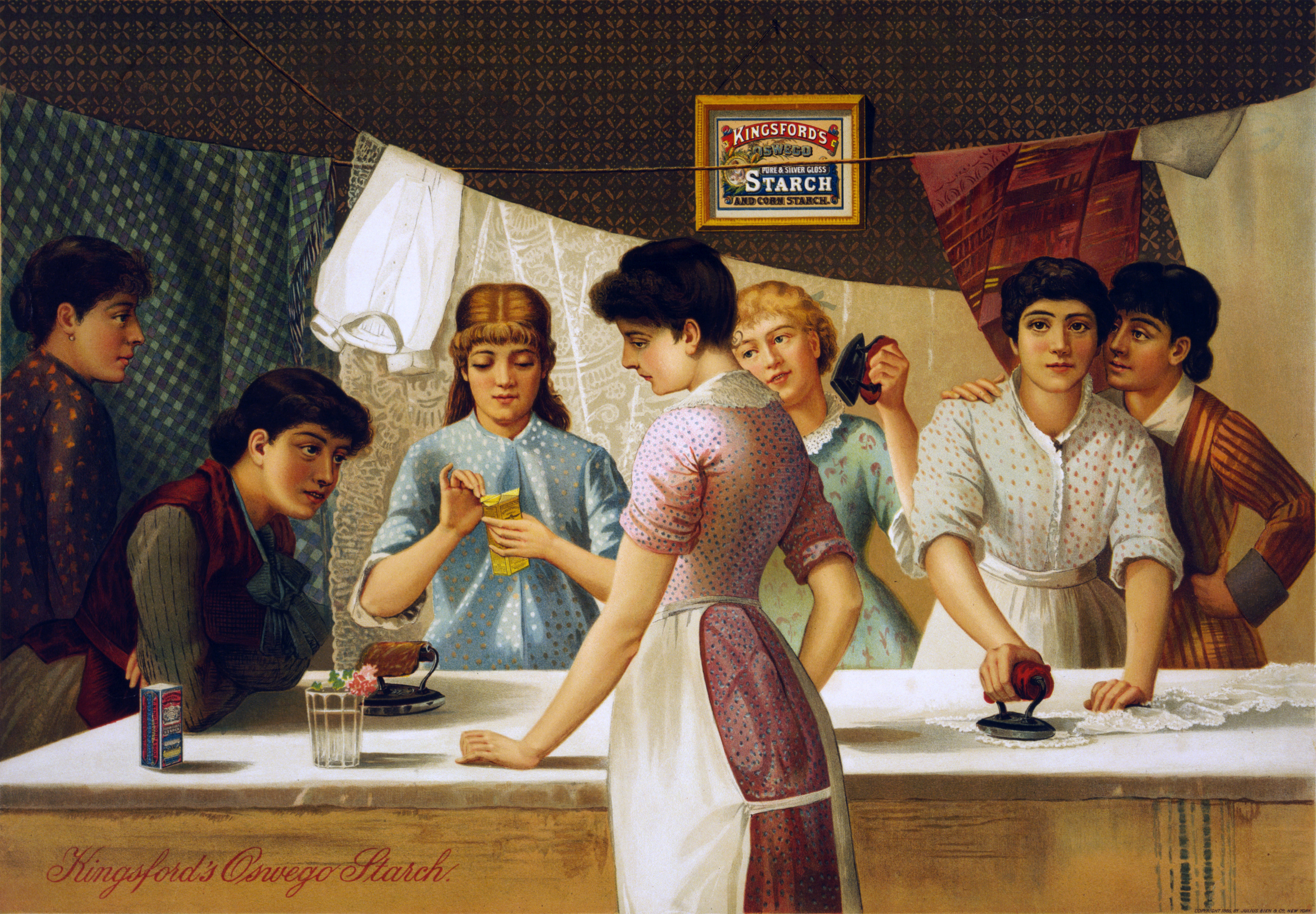
Kingsford Oswego Starch advertising, 1885

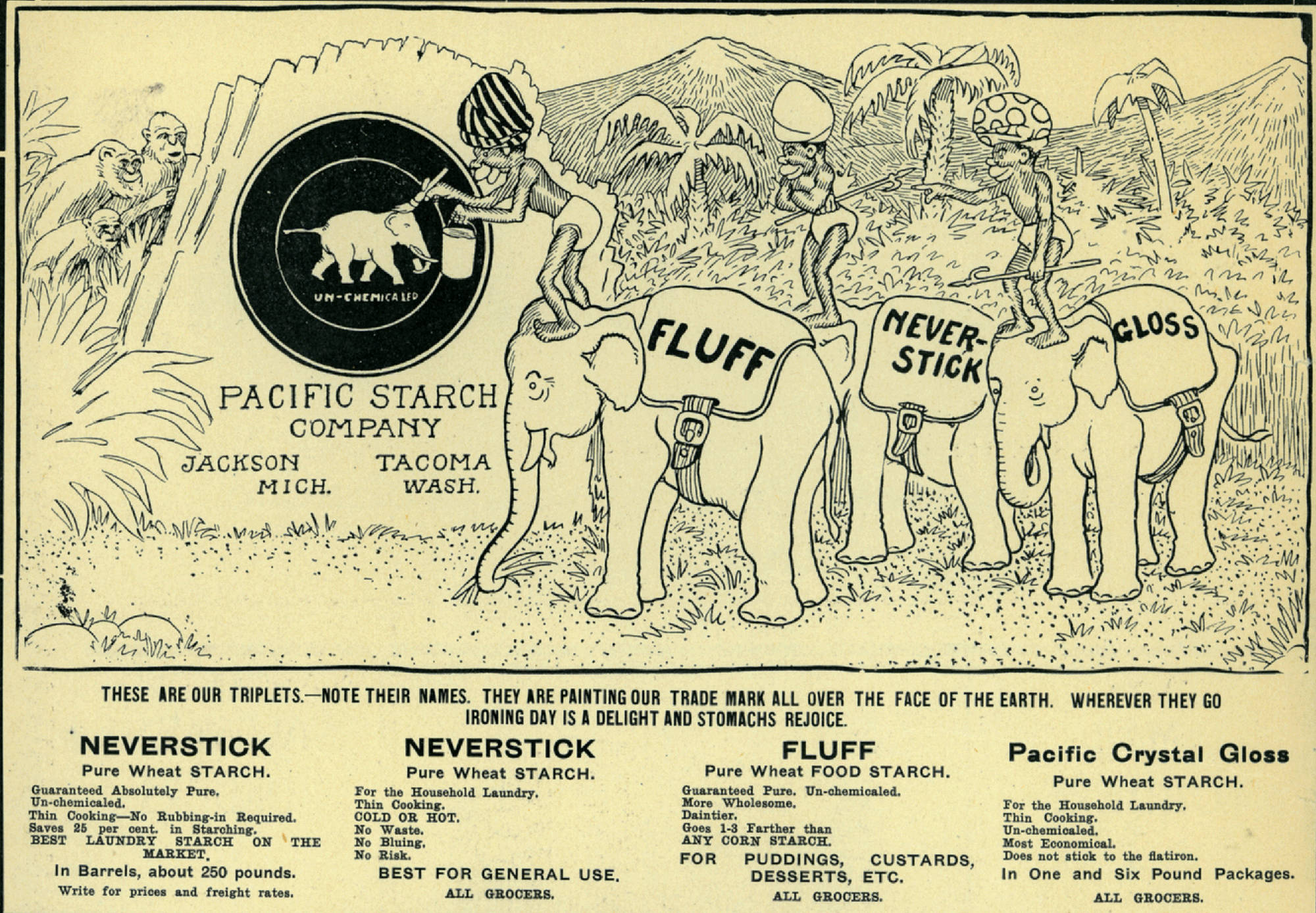
Pacific Laundry and Cooking Starch advert, 1904
