= Men's Dress Furnishings Association =

Former US trade association

The Men's Dress Furnishings Association was a trade association based in New York, New York, which promoted men's fashion accessories, with a primary focus on dress shirts and neckties. The group also educated consumers at high schools and colleges.

Founded in 1947 as the Men's Tie Foundation, they changed their name to the Neckwear Association of America in 1978. In 2003, due to a decline in its membership as a result of manufacturers closing, consolidating, or losing business to overseas competition, the Association added dress shirt manufacturers to boost their membership and became the Men's Dress Furnishings Association.

The group announced in 2008 that it was shutting down after 60 years. Membership in the group had declined from a high of 120 manufacturers in the 1980s to 25 in 2008. Increased competition from manufacturers outside the United States as well as the declining number of men wearing ties were cited.
