= Dress shirt =

Type of shirt

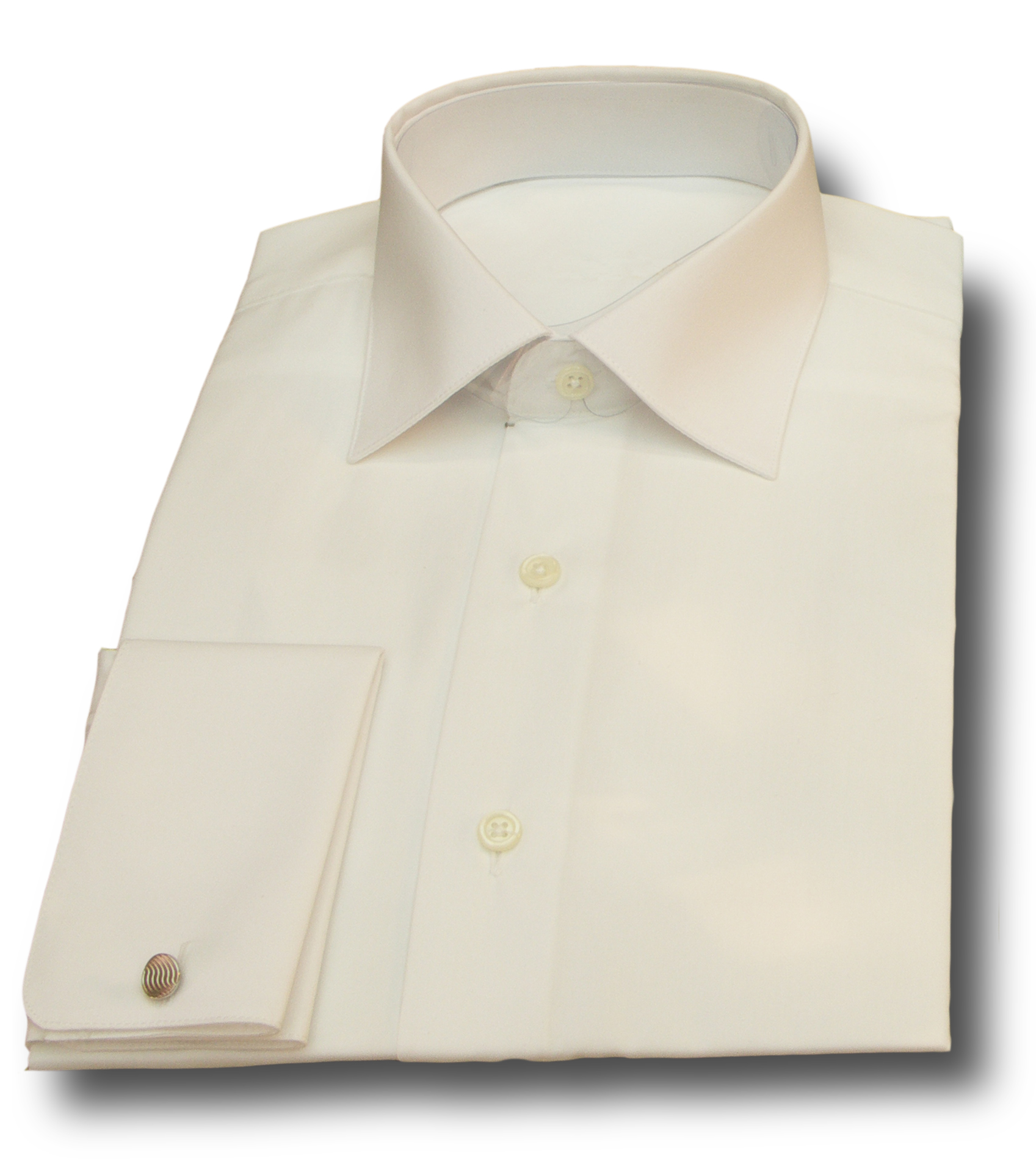
A folded white dress shirt with French double cuffs

In American English, a dress shirt, button shirt, button-front, button-front shirt, or button-up shirt — simply shirt in British English — is a garment with a collar and a full-length opening at the front, which is fastened using buttons or shirt studs. A button-down or button-down shirt is a dress shirt with a button-down collar – a collar having the ends fastened to the shirt with buttons.

A dress shirt is normally made from woven cloth, and is typically accompanied by a tie or bow tie, jacket, suit, or formalwear, but a dress shirt may also be worn more casually.

In British English, "dress shirt" — "formal shirt" or "tuxedo shirt" in American English — means specifically the more formal evening garment, often with an embroidered decorative chest to be paired with a cummerbund, worn with black-tie dinner jacket or white-tie tailcoat. Some of these formal shirts have stiff fronts and detachable collars, either standing wing collar or fold-down collar, attached with collar studs.

== History ==
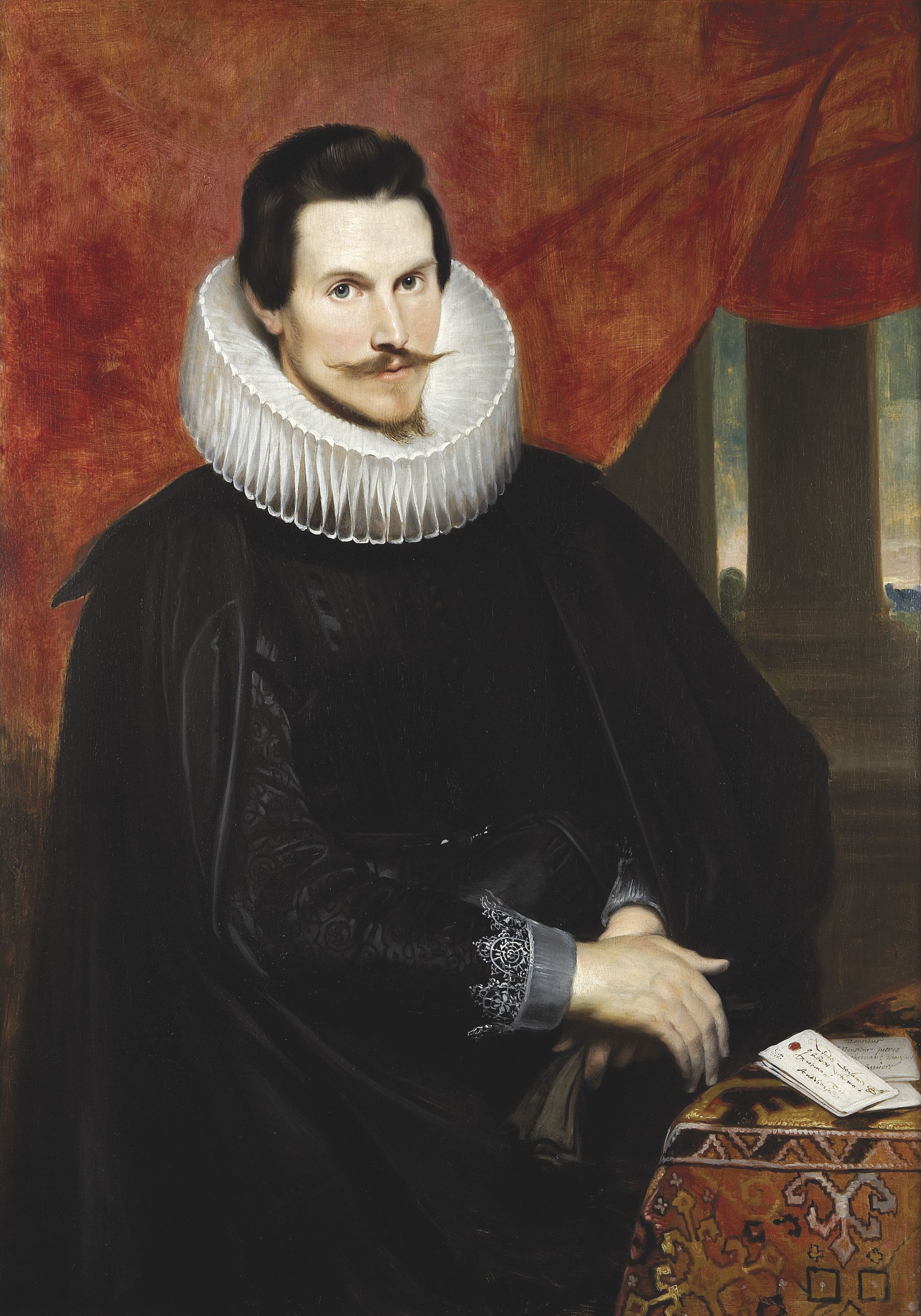
In 17th century, men's shirts and cuffs were embellished with fine lace.

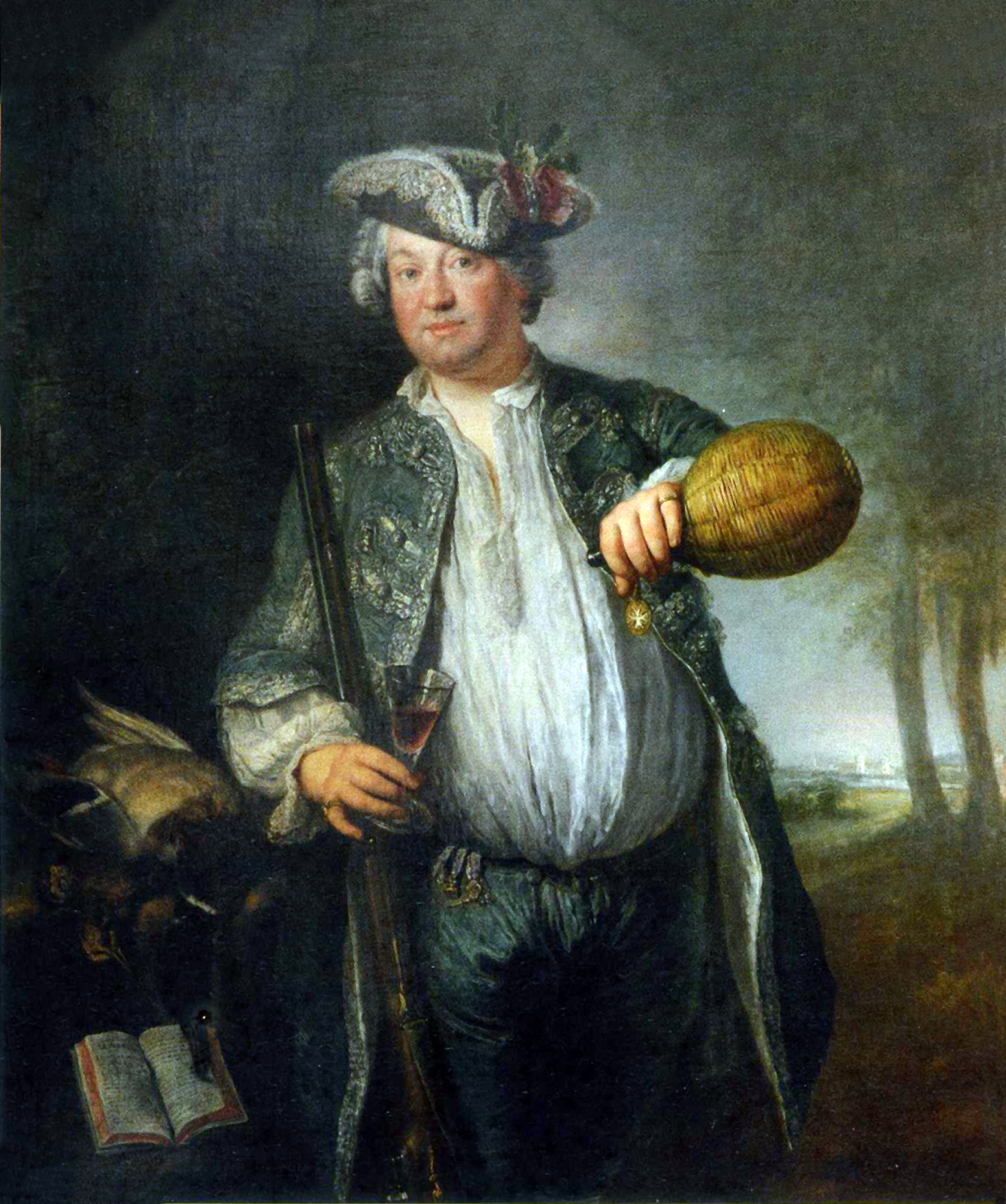
The shirt was worn under the Justaucorps in the 18th century.

Traditionally dress shirts were worn by men and boys, whereas women and girls often wore blouses, sometimes known as chemises. However, in the mid-1800s, they also became an item of women's clothing and are worn by both sexes today.

== Components ==
A shirt has several components:

- A one-piece back, which is usually pleated, gathered, or eased into a section of fabric in the upper part of the back behind the neck and over the shoulders known as the yoke (either one-piece or seamed vertically in the middle).
- Two front panels which overlap slightly down the middle on the placket to fasten with buttons (or, more rarely, shirt studs).
- One-piece sleeves with plackets at the wrist with a band of fabric around each wrist known as a cuff, or else short-sleeved (cut off above the elbow), though this is not traditional.
- A collar, a strip around the neck, which is normally a turndown collar, with the strip folded down away from the neck, leaving two points at the front, the width of which is known as the spread.

Originally the collars and cuffs were detachable, held on by studs or buttons, for ease of tailoring and maintenance. This was because these had the most wear and got dirtier more quickly so need special washing and more frequent replacement in a time when laundering was very labor-intensive and difficult work to what were very expensive products prior to mass-manufacturing.

=== Collars ===
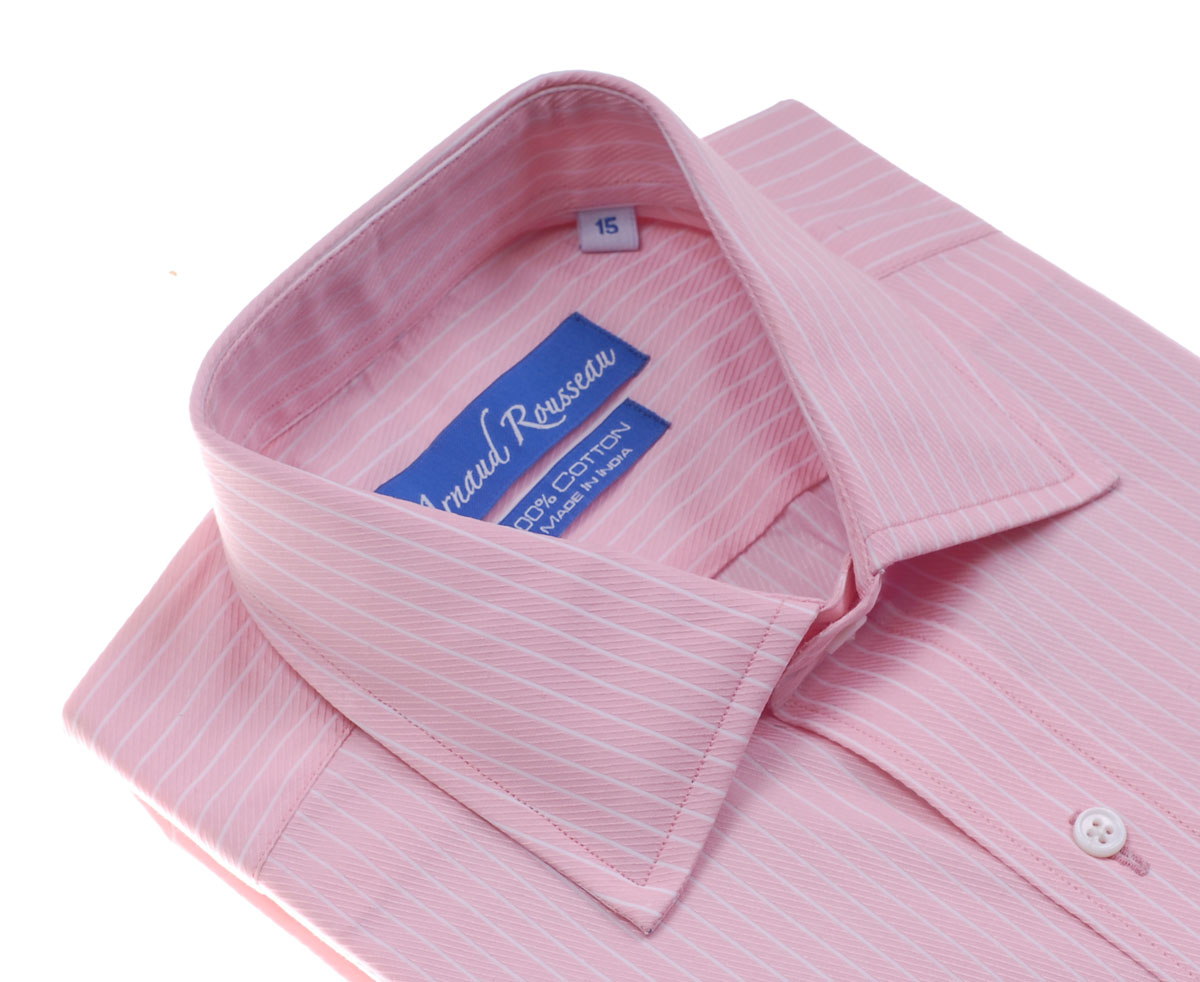
Spread collars measure from around 3 1/2 to 8 1/2 inches (89 to 216 mm) between the collar points

There are various styles of collar, which is the primary indicator of the formality of a shirt. Those discussed here are all attached collars, not styles specific to detachable collars. The very top button is number 1.

- Spread collars measure from around 3 1/2 to 8 1/2 inches (89 to 216 mm) between the collar points, and the wider collars are often referred to as cutaway or Windsor collars after the Duke of Windsor. This city style is more formal, though it is common in Europe, and predominant in the UK.
- Point, straight, or small collars are narrow, with 2 1/2 to 4 inches (64 to 102 mm) between the points of the collar.
- Button-down collar (sport collar) with a button-fastening point on the front of the shirt. Originally a British sports (football, cricket, polo, etc.) shirt. The British polo player's shirt was first produced in the UK by John E Brooks in 1896 and copied by Brooks Brothers after his return to the USA. Commonly worn with or without a necktie in the United States but usually worn without a necktie elsewhere.

The less-common styles below were all once common, but have waned in popularity.

- Eyelet collars require a barbell-style collar bar to join the small stitched hole on each point.
- Tab collars are point collars with two strips of fabric extending from the middle of the collar and joined behind the tie. These lift the tie, giving an arc effect similar to a pinned collar. The tabs can be closed with a metal snap, button or stud.
- Club collars have rounded edges, and were very popular in the first few decades of the 20th century. They have experienced a surge in popularity due to television dramas like Downton Abbey.
- The varsity is a type of spread collar in which the points curve outward from the placket of the shirt.
- Shirts designed to take a detachable collar have a tunic collar, which is a low standing band of fabric around the neck, with a hole at the front and back for the collar studs.
- Winchester shirts are colored or patterned shirts that have a contrasting white collar (conceivably of any style) and, sometimes, contrasting white cuffs. This style is a remnant of when shirts had detachable collars and the collars were (usually) only available in white. Winchester shirts have fallen in and out of fashion over time but became strongly associated with the financial industry in the 1980s when the character Gordon Gekko wore Winchester shirts in the film Wall Street.

=== Cuffs ===
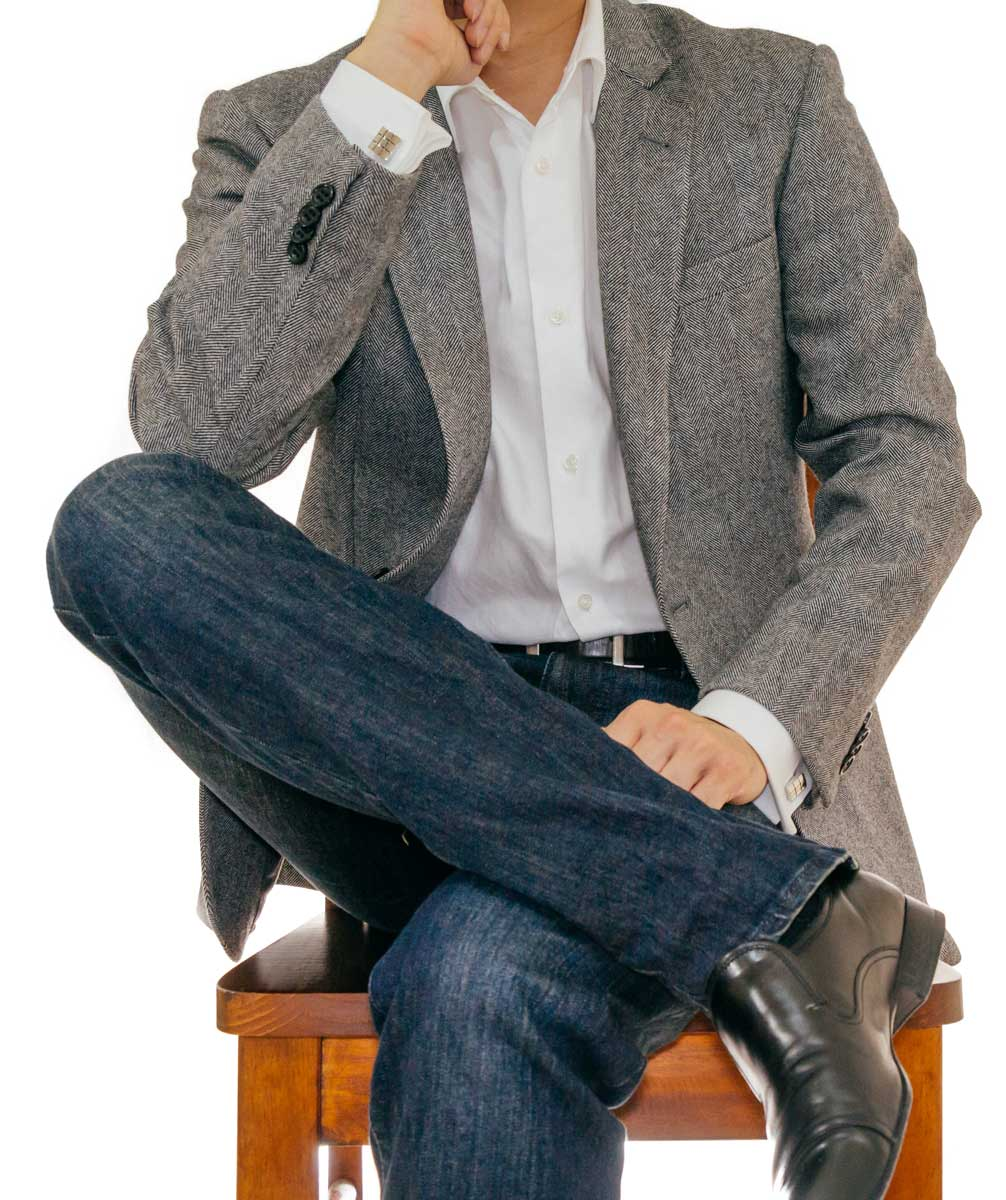
Double cuffs have an extra length of sleeve folded back and fastened with links.

The main distinctions between cuffs are whether they require buttons or cufflinks to fasten, and whether they are folded back (double) or single. The main resulting types are therefore:

- Barrel cuffs, the standard style fastened by one or two buttons according to taste.
- Double, or French, cuffs, which have an extra length of sleeve folded back and fastened with links, and are usually considered more formal than barrel cuffs.
- Single cuffs, the most formal style, usually only worn with formal evening wear (i.e. "white tie"), are fastened with cuff links but are not folded back.
- Milanese cuffs in which the barrel has a portion of fabric that is folded back similar to a French cuff with no cufflinks. sometimes called gauntlet cuff.

In addition, there are some variations, for example barrel cuffs may be mitred, with the corner cut off at 45°. Less common styles include the Portofino, or cocktail cuff, which is a double cuff closed with buttons rather than cufflinks, first made by the Jermyn Street shirtmakers Turnbull & Asser, and later popularised by the fictional character James Bond in the films from 1962 onwards.

=== Other features ===
A high quality traditional shirt has long tails, extending almost to the knees at the back, and so has seven or eight buttons. The vertical strip of fabric running down the front opening is called the placket, and gives a more symmetrical appearance to the joint between the left side, on top, and the right. This left over right order is also seen in waistcoat and coat fastenings, though women's clothing buttons the other way (right over left). The buttonholes, aligned vertically, are placed on the placket, though the top button and buttons at the bottom of stiff fronts are aligned horizontally. The buttonholes are one of the few places where the difference between hand and machine stitching can be observed while the shirt is being worn, and fashion designers sometimes use contrasting thread here or on the buttons themselves for extra impact.

To give extra fullness to the back, there are often pleats where the back panel joins to the yoke. On some fittings these are not needed, and handmade shirts may feature the extra fabric being worked continuously into the seam. In America, a box pleat is common (two pleats together in the centre), while in Britain the pleats are placed wider out under the shoulders.

The less casual shirts in Britain will have no pockets, but the standard shirt in America has a single one on the wearer's left side, which is a sewn-on patch with a plain upper hem, optionally with a single button for closure. This small pocket is large enough to hold a pack of cigarettes or a few pens (a pocket protector can be used). Less formal shirts may feature larger pockets, dual pockets, or pockets with flap closures; safari or other military styled shirts often feature two large pockets with buttoned flaps. Less formal shirts may have small pockets on the sleeves as well. Shoulder straps are virtually non-existent on formal shirts, with the exception of military clothing.

Short-sleeved shirts have a plain (no-button) hem above the wearer's elbow. They are considered a casual summer or tropical option, though many people wear only the traditional long sleeves in all circumstances.

== Formal shirts ==
In the UK, the term dress shirt is reserved for a particular type of formal shirt. There are formal day shirts for wearing with morning dress, and the white dress shirts used as eveningwear.

A day dress shirt is fairly similar to a normal shirt, and is usually white, with a stiff detachable collar, though other designs, such as a vertical blue stripe, are also appropriate. Double cuffs are most common. This sort of shirt is also conventionally worn by some barristers and judges.

An evening shirt, for wear with eveningwear, for example as part of black or white tie has some unique features. In the U.S., this shirt is often called a tuxedo shirt or tux shirt. The shirt is always white.

The shirt required for white tie is very specific. It should have a detachable wing collar and be fastened with shirt studs instead of buttons on the front. The studs are normally mother of pearl set in gold or silver, but black onyx inlay is also permissible. The cufflinks should match the studs. The shirt front has panels made of different material from the rest of the shirt which are the only parts seen under the waistcoat. The shape of the panels, one on each side, is either rectangular, or the older U-shape (designed to sit under the older 1920s U-shaped waistcoats, now largely replaced by the more modern V-shape). The material for the panels is either layers of thick plain cotton that is heavily starched (this type is often called a boiled front shirt as the shirt needs to be put in boiling water to remove the starch before cleaning), or marcella (piqué) cotton. Marcella is more common, but a little less formal, though still appropriate, since it was originally designed to be used on formal evening shirts, as the ribbing can pick up more starch and create an even stiffer front. Traditionally, collarless shirts with a detachable wing collar fastened on with collar studs have been used, but all-in-one designs are occasionally seen, though this is considered incorrect and to give a poor appearance by many. Cuffs are single, and heavily starched (if the front is marcella, the cuffs usually match).

== Materials ==
Shirts are made of woven cloth. The natural fibers used more commonly in the past were cotton (the most frequent), linen (the oldest), ramie, wool or silk. Nowadays, artificial fibers, such as polyester or polyester blends, are also used, due to their low cost and being less prone to creasing, despite being considered by most shirtmakers the poorest material, owing to less softness and breathability. However, while high quality cotton shirts can survive with care a few decades, a polyester/cotton blend may be used in more demanding environments. Giza cotton is a type of high-quality cotton which is the preferred choice among high-end shirtmakers, because of its long staple length. Linen produces a cool fabric that wrinkles heavily, and is mostly used in light summer shirts. Cotton is therefore the standard material for all but the cheapest shirts. Silk is occasionally worn, though it is hot to wear and has a marked sheen.

Yarns from these fibers are woven into a variety of different weaves, the most notable of which include broadcloth, with double the number of warp to weft threads, giving a smooth, formal shirting; twill, where the tucks of the weft do not line up, giving a diagonal pattern, a weave used for most country checked (e.g. tattersall) shirtings; poplin, with a heavier warp than weft, giving more formal fabric; and Oxford weaves. Plain Oxford or pinpoint Oxford weaves are popular as casual fabrics, so are generally used in combination with a button-down collar, while royal Oxford is versatile enough to be used on both sporty and formal shirts. There are many other weaves or variations on these, including end-on-end patterns, where alternate white and coloured threads are used, giving a mottled appearance, or more exotic weaves, including voile and batiste, which are extremely light fabrics only used for summer shirts or on the unseen parts of formal shirts.

The use of pattern and colour is also significant. Originally, in the Edwardian era, when the modern shirt emerged, all shirts were white. Gradually more colours were introduced, including blue, the most popular colour, particularly in lighter shades such as Wedgwood. A full range of colours is now commonly available, although white, light blue, cream, and to a lesser extent pale shades of pink and lavender, remain the mainstays of conventional business attire. Less traditional shirts are also made with darker colours. Bright colours and prints for very casual wear were popularised after the War by light holiday clothes such as the Hawaiian shirt.

For more formal business shirts, a plain weave or subtle pattern like herringbone is the norm. In more casual settings, stripes and checkered patterns are common along with plain weaves. In more rural areas, plaid or checkered shirts may be more common, such as the tattersall shirts associated with British country clothing. The size of the pattern is meant to coordinate with tweeds of different patterns. Further, the use of colour may be somewhat seasonal, with shades like green being associated more with autumn than summer ones like yellow. Colours and patterns may also be chosen for more than simply aesthetic reasons, as trends such as power dressing (first noted in Molloy, Dress for Success [1975]) emphasise the social impact of clothing. For example, a business executive might stereotypically prefer pinstriped suits and red neckties to project a particular image.

=== Non-iron ===
Wrinkle-free shirts have become popular after being first introduced by Brooks Brothers in 1953. A resin used for making non-wrinkle shirts releases formaldehyde, which could cause contact dermatitis for some people - particularly those who have already developed an allergy; no disclosure requirements exist, and in 2008 the US Government Accountability Office tested formaldehyde in clothing and found that generally the highest levels were in non-wrinkle shirts and pants.

The use of artificial fibers — especially nylon originally, but now more commonly polyester often in a blend with cotton — have produced shirt fabrics that are considered easy-care due to these fabrics having a lower propensity to crease during wear and laundering, unlike linen and (to a lesser degree) cotton.

== Shirt wearing ==
The hem is tucked into the trousers. For business wear and formalwear, a coat and tie (or bow tie) are viewed as compulsory. When a tie is worn, the top button of the shirt is fastened, so the tie can fit snugly around the wearer's neck with a neat appearance. When a tie is not worn, conventions on buttoning differ globally: in the United States and the United Kingdom, the top button is virtually never buttoned if a tie is not worn – but unbuttoning two or more buttons is seen as overly casual. In France, unbuttoning two buttons is more common, and politicians appear on TV in this style. Buttoning the top button in the absence of a tie, has been in recent years popular with younger people, while it has become an identity of lesbianism, often with plaid or checked shirts and rolled up sleeves. This is also known as a buttoned collar. Polo shirts are more likely to be worn with the top button fastened however, mainly that of Fred Perry shirts. In casual usage, these conventions are often not followed, with many choosing to wear shirts not tucked in, or leaving the top button undone with a tie. Even more casually, some now choose not to iron their shirts, or use non-traditional 'non-iron' fabrics. Similarly, as part of more casual work attire, some American men wear shirts with the top two buttons unbuttoned (buttoned at the third button), though buttoning at the fourth button is widely seen as too casual. Accordingly, some shirts are manufactured with a difference at the second or third button, by way of subtle cue as to where to button. Most casually, the shirt can be worn entirely unbuttoned, over a T-shirt.

== Fit ==
In the US, ready-to-wear sizes of dress shirts traditionally consist of two numbers such as 15½ 34, meaning that the shirt has a neck 15 1/2 inches (390 mm) in girth (measured from centre of top button to centre of corresponding buttonhole) and a sleeve 34 inches (860 mm) long (measured from midpoint of the back and shoulders to the wrist). However, to reduce the number of sizes needed to be manufactured and stocked, sleeve length is sometimes given in the form 15½ 34/35 (indicating a neck 15 1/2 inches (390 mm) in girth and an actual 35 inches (890 mm) sleeve), but with each cuff having two buttons, so that the cuff diameter can be reduced to keep the cuff more snug on the wrist, thus approximating the shorter length when so worn. Since the sleeve and neck size do not take into account waist size, some shirts are cut wide to accommodate large belly sizes. Shirts cut for flat stomachs are usually labeled, "fitted", "tailored fit" "athletic fit" or "trim fit". The terms for fuller cut shirts are more varied ("Traditional", "Regular", "Classic", etc.) and are sometimes explained on a shirt maker's website. Additionally, "Portly" or "Big" are often used for neck sizes of 18 inches (460 mm) or more. Very casual button-front shirts are often sized as small, medium, large, and so on. The meaning of these ad-hoc sizes is similarly not standardized and varies between manufacturers.

In the bespoke (custom-made) industry where each shirt is made from an individually measured and drafted pattern, sizing is very much more precise, avoiding these problems as well as exactly accommodating different comparative lengths or musculature between arms and shoulders, though there are still different ways of making the shirt fit. While many choose to cut the sleeve long and have the cuff catch on the hand to regulate its length, some prefer the much harder option of using a high armhole and carefully tailored shape, so that the cuff can be loose and still sit in exactly the right place wherever the arm moves. Concept design is a specific type of bespoke where the customer can choose also the features of the shirt. These features are usually created by the designer.

Made-to-measure shirts may not fit quite as well as bespoke, but can provide a similar degree of fabric selection, customization and fit at a lower cost than bespoke, so long as the maker's underlying pattern generally fits well.

For sixty years, US designers and manufacturers of neckties and dress shirts were members of the Men's Dress Furnishings Association but the trade group shut down in 2008 due to declining membership caused by the declining numbers of men wearing neckties.

== As part of dress codes ==
Dress shirts are overwhelmingly dominant as formal and business (even business casual) attire for men, and they are almost always expected (or even required where dress codes are enforced) to be worn for such occasions. This tends to apply even when neckties or suit jackets are not, or when even jeans may be worn in lieu of dress pants.

Traditionally, only solid or striped shirts in white, shades of off-white (such as cream or ecru), and light blue were seen as appropriate for business attire in North America. In the United Kingdom, lighter shades of pink and lavender are usually seen as equally appropriate. Checked shirts, particularly tattersall patterns, are associated with British country clothing and are seen more in rarer occasions when dress shirts are worn casually.

== Industrial production ==
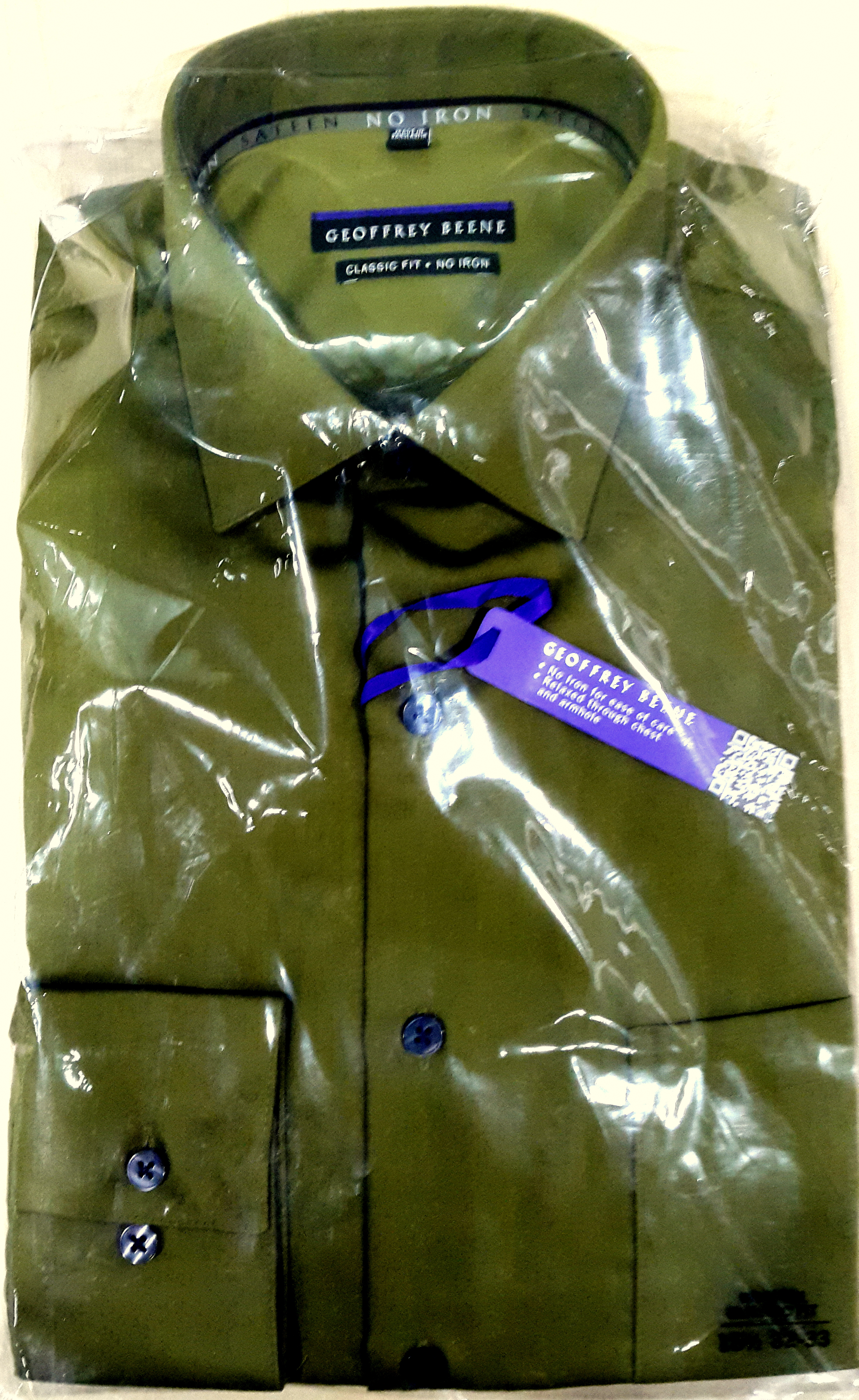
Dress Shirt finished product

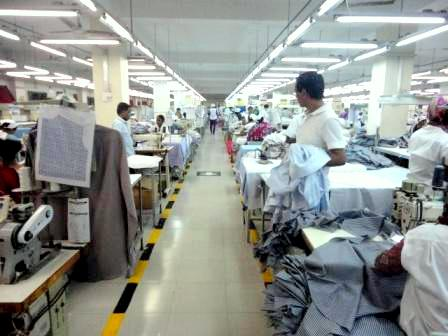
Production line

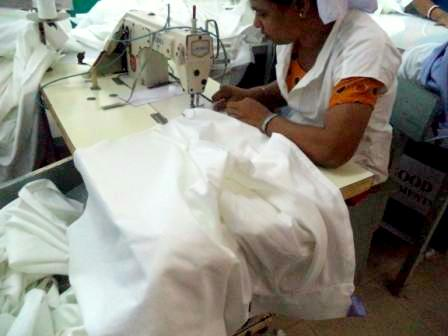
Sewing operation

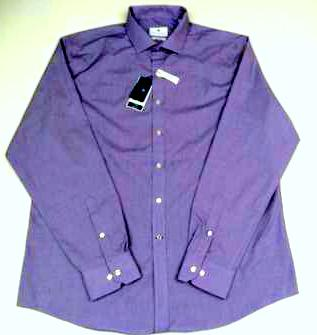
Quality checking

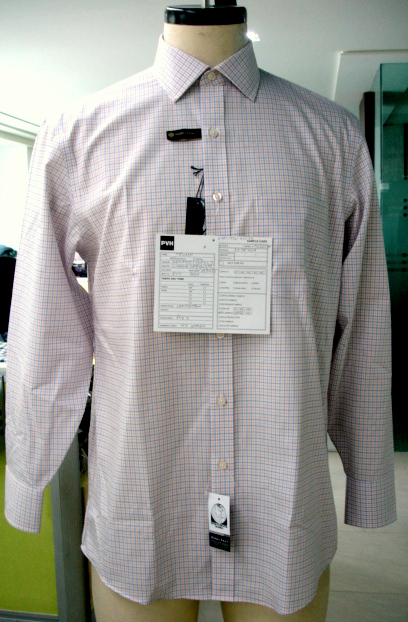
Fitting checking on dummy

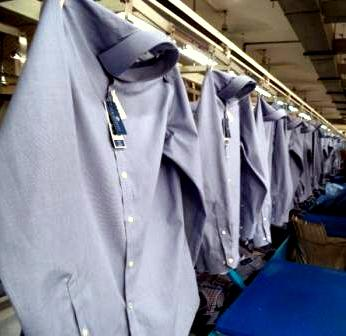
Dress shirt on conveyor

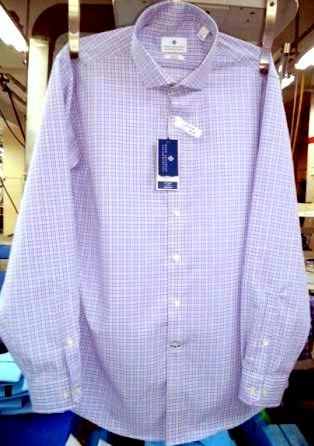
Pressing standard

== See also ==
- Shirt
- Shirtdress (worn by women)
