= Bowling shirt =

Clothing associated with the sport of bowling

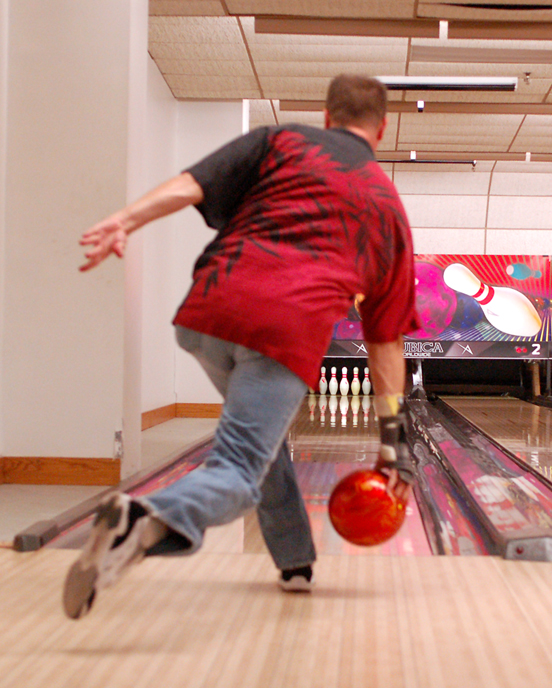
Ten-pin bowling in a bowling shirt

A bowling shirt, often referred to as a "bowler", is a distinctive and iconic piece of clothing closely associated with the sport of bowling. These shirts have a style of camp shirt in which the fabric, color and design vary greatly, but frequently incorporate contrasting earth tones and simple geometric designs, with more expensive ones often made of silk. They may have a single pocket on the left—small logos or monogram initials are also common options on the left breast.

== Origins ==
Bowling shirts have their roots in the 1950s when bowling became a popular recreational activity in the United States. During this time, bowling alleys were not just places for competition but also social gatherings. To match the leisurely atmosphere of bowling, bowlers began wearing shirts designed explicitly for the sport. These shirts were a departure from traditional attire and quickly gained popularity for their comfort and style.

== Culture ==
The shirt is associated most directly with ten-pin bowling but they are also associated with bar culture, billiards culture and rockabilly, ska, and jump blues music. The Two and a Half Men character Charlie Harper, portrayed by Charlie Sheen, often wears two-tone bowling shirts.
