= End-on-end =

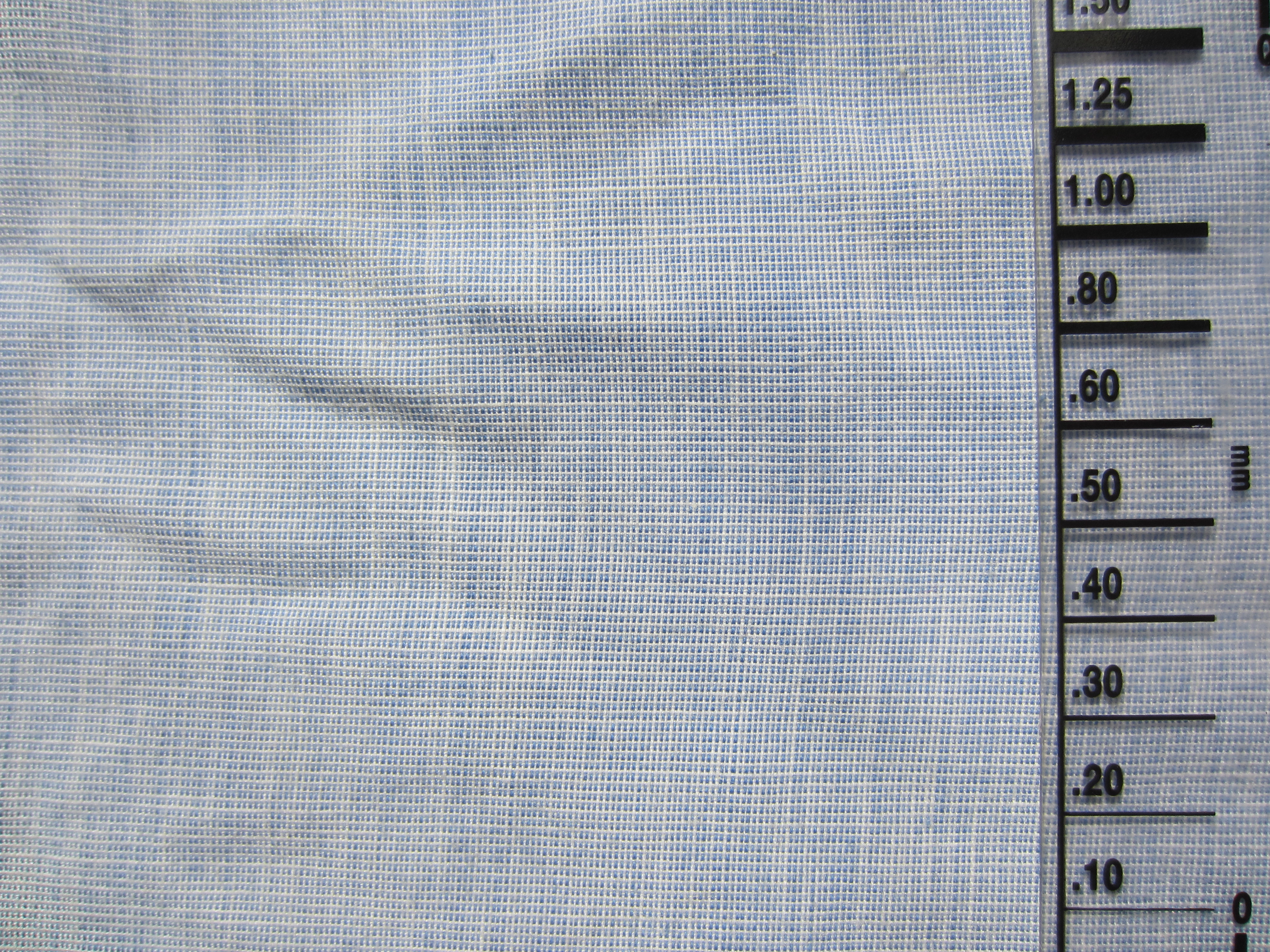
Example of blue end-on-end cloth. Scale shown in millimeters.

End-on-end (also fil-à-fil) is a type of closely woven, plain weave cloth created by the alternation of light and dark warp and weft threads, resulting in a heathered effect. The English term comes from the French "fil-à-fil", literally "thread-to-thread". It is most commonly woven from cotton or linen fibers. End-on-end is almost identical to cambric (also known as chambray), lacking only the calendering which gives cambric fabric its glossy appearance.

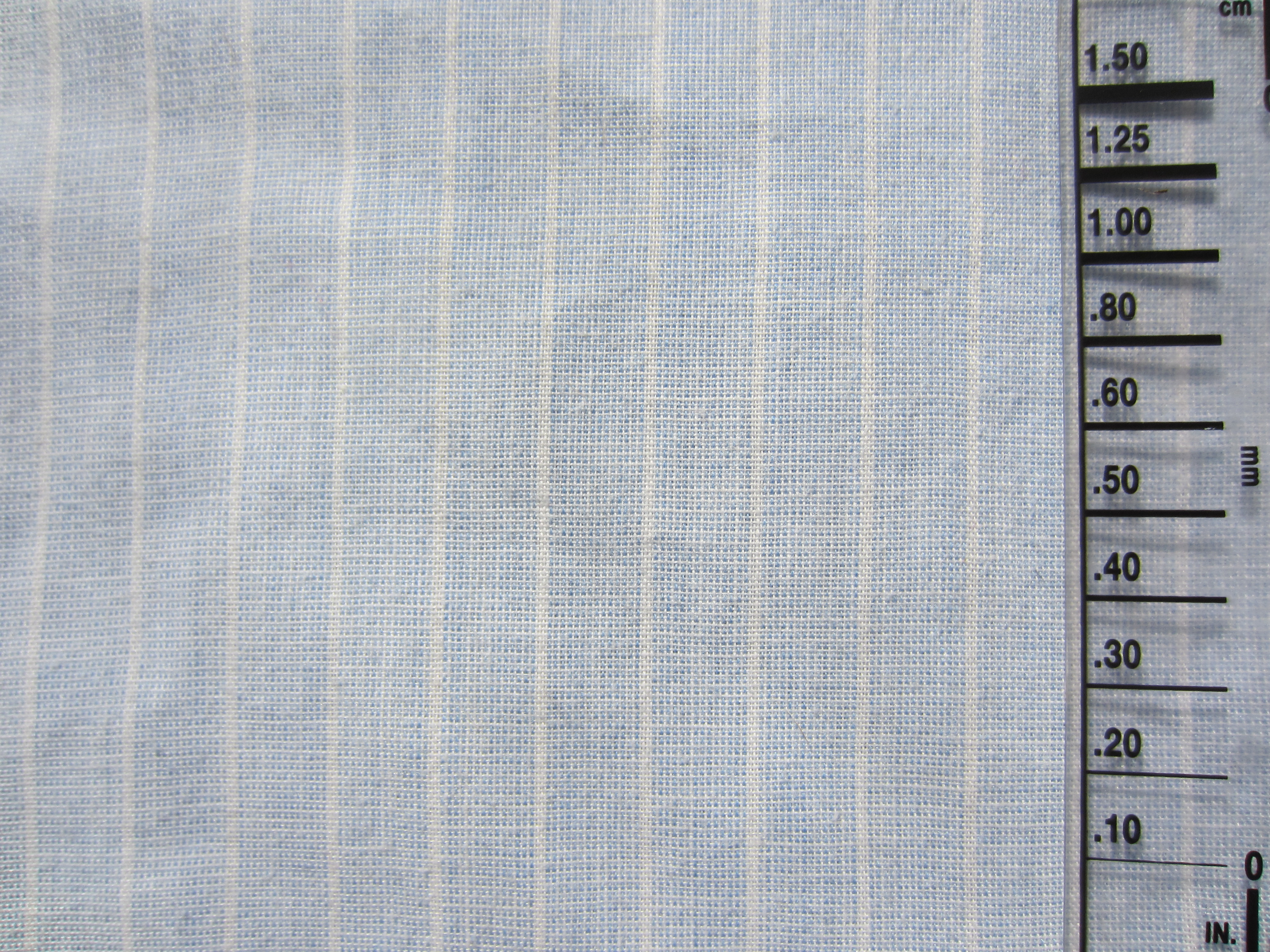
Example of light blue end-on-end cloth with white stripes. Scale shown in millimeters.

End-on-end is typically woven using white thread with another color to create a fabric with a subtly heathered texture that, from a distance, appears as a solid color. Occasionally, variations are seen which use two colors of thread (instead of white). It may also be incorporated into a stripe pattern.

== Uses ==
End-on-end broadcloth is commonly used in dress shirts.

== See also ==
- Cambric
