= Detachable collar =

Shirt collar made of paper or fabric

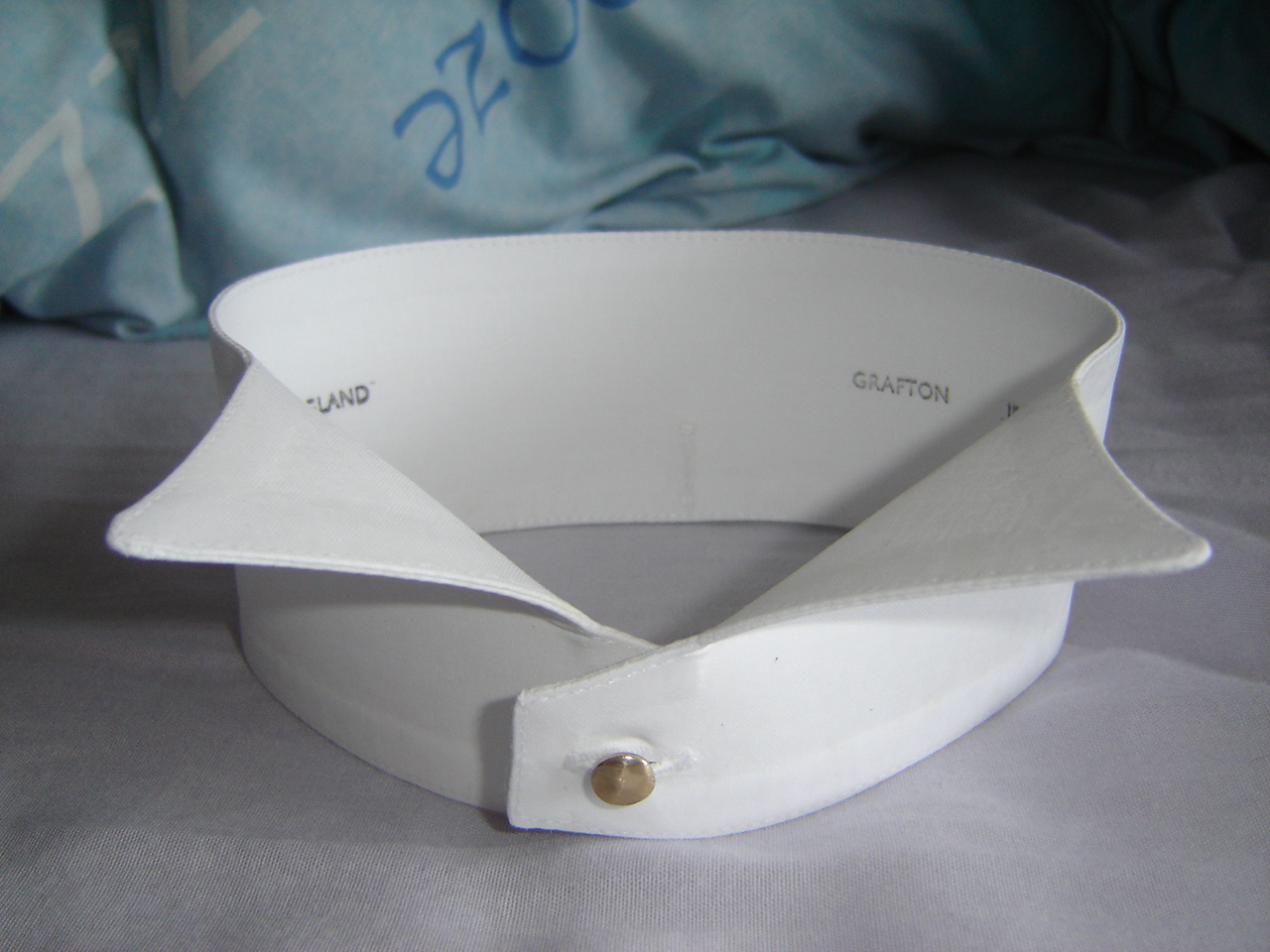
A starched-stiff detachable wing collar from Luke Eyres

A detachable collar or a false collar is a shirt collar separate from the shirt, fastened to it by studs. The collar is usually made of a different fabric from the shirt, in which case it is almost always white, and, being unattached to the shirt, can be starched to a hard cardboard-like consistency.

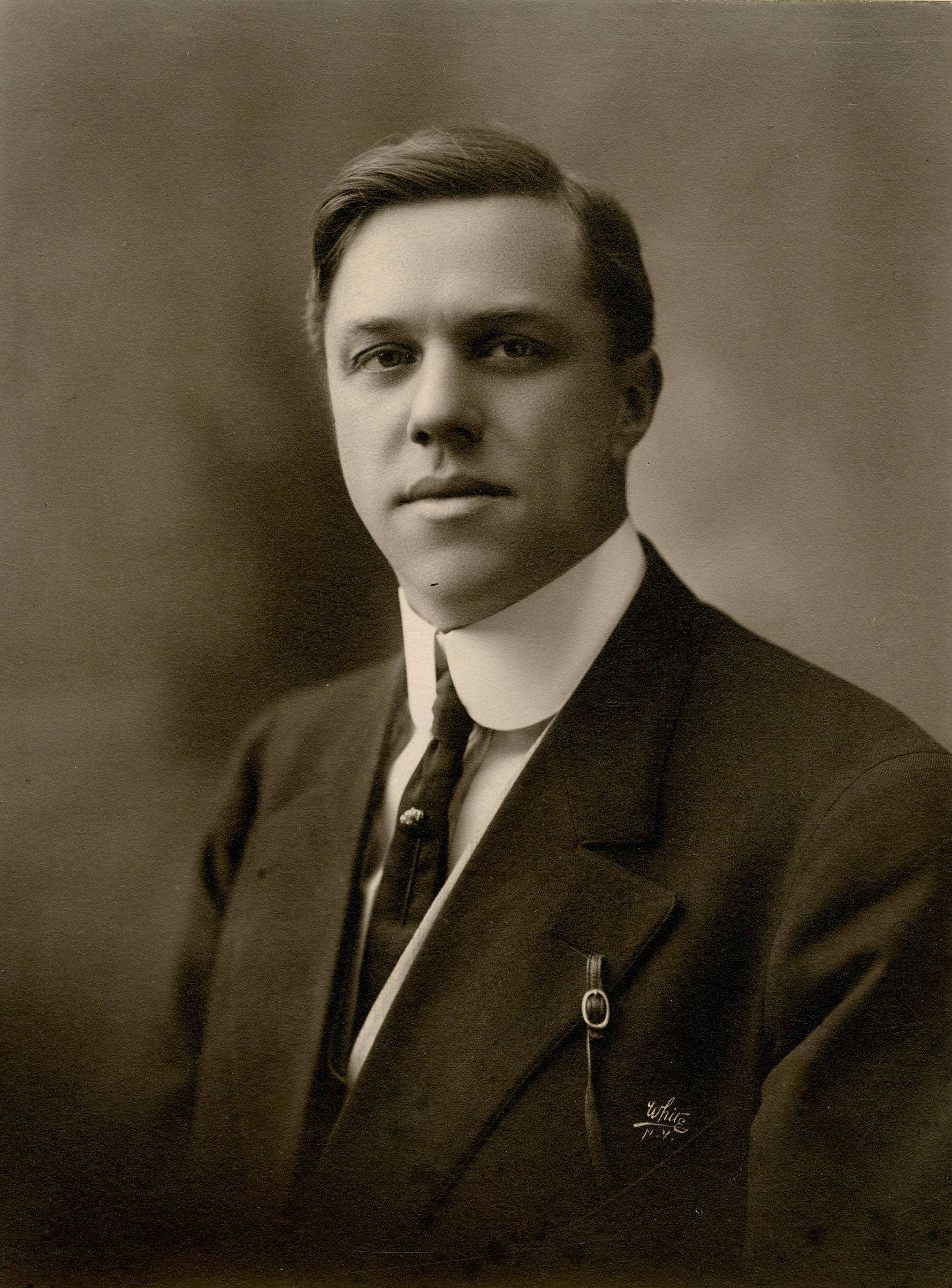
Man wearing detachable collar, 1910 USA

== History ==
The local history of Troy, New York, attributes the invention of the detachable collar in 1827 to Hannah Montague, who wished to avoid washing her husband's shirts when only the collars were dirty. She cut off the collars and attached lengths of fabric tape so that they could be tied around the neck of the collarless shirt. This meant that collars could be washed independently, saving time and labour. The Rev. Ebenezer Brown, a businessman in town, proceeded to commercialize the concept. The manufacture of detachable collars and the associated shirts became a significant industry in Troy. It is also why Troy is called the 'Collar City'.

It was later that the benefit of being able to starch the collars became apparent, and for a short time, various other parts of the shirt, such as the front and cuffs, were also made detachable and treated to rigid stiffness. As more emphasis started to be placed on comfort in clothing this practice declined, and the stiff collar is the last surviving use of such heavily starched cotton in daywear. Today a full dress shirt (worn with white tie and occasionally black tie) still has a stiff (but attached) front and cuffs to accompany the stiff detachable collar.

== Using a detachable collar ==
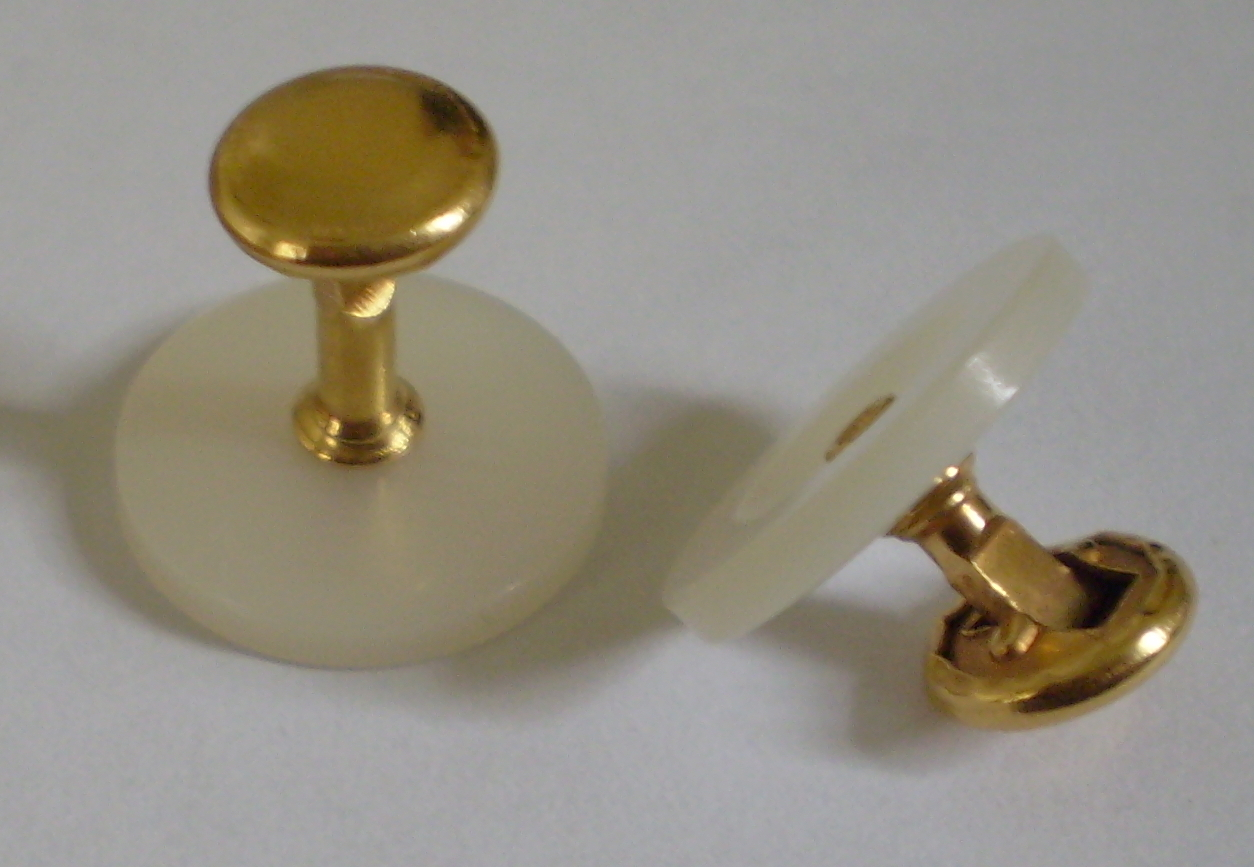
A pair of collar studs; the longer left one is the front stud.

The collar is attached to the shirt by a pair of studs like those shown to the left. The shirt has a tunic collar, a short upright band of fabric with a hole at the back and one on each side at the front. The stiff collar is attached at the back before the shirt is donned (and the tie placed under the collar for a turndown collar), then the shirt is put on, after which the front stud is pushed through the collar to fasten it.

Detachable collars are often used by barristers in the UK, Ireland and Canada, many of whom wear a wing collar when in court to allow the use of bands. On the way to and from court, a turndown collar and tie are worn. Another common use of detachable collars now is a clerical collar (or "Roman Collar"), though these are now often made from flexible plastic for ease of washing, and are not always now attached in the traditional way with studs. Also, at Eton College, all pupils wear stiff collars, mostly turndown collars, while students in positions of authority wear 'stick-ups', which includes a wing collar.

Outside these situations, detachable collars are less common. Stiff collars in particular with daywear in the 21st century are generally rare, but if one is worn, it is usually a turndown collar, though morning dress is seen still with a wing collar. Older styles, such as the imperial collar (a high collar with no wings last popular with the Edwardians), are not frequently seen now. A more common use of detachable collars is with eveningwear, in which case a high wing collar is worn in America although turndown collars are preferred for black-tie in Britain as per Edward VIII.

To starch a collar, it must be rinsed in boiling water to remove any starch, then laundered as normal. After soaking in a concentrated warm starch solution, it is left until nearly dry, then ironed until hard. While ironing, the shape is added by curling, or using a collar press.

== See also ==
- Collar (clothing)
