= Oxford (cloth) =

Type of woven dress shirt fabric

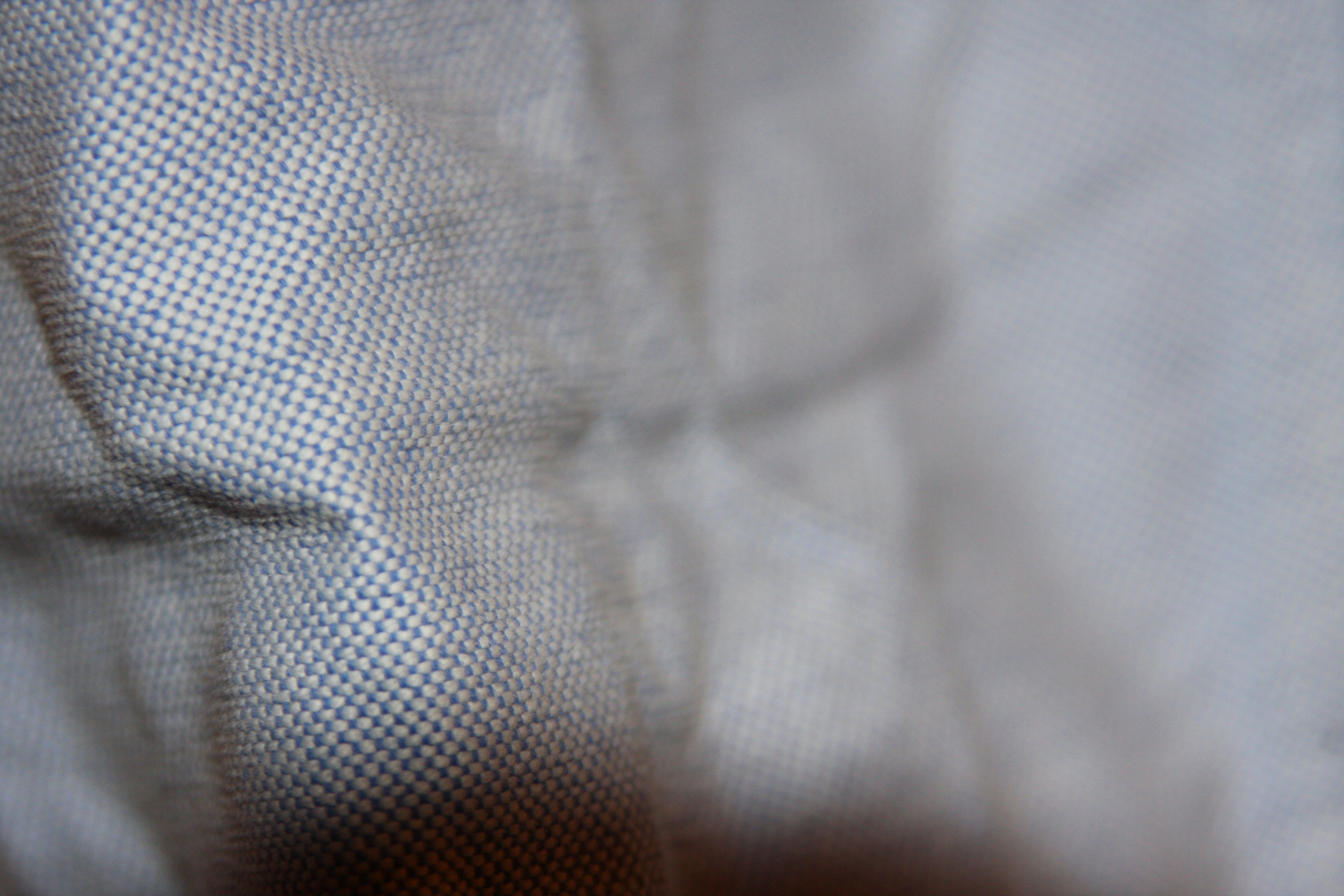

Oxford cloth is a type of woven fabric that is often employed to make dress shirts, sometimes called Oxford shirts, worn on casual to formal occasions. It emerged in the 18th century and expanded in popularity with the Industrial Revolution improving its manufactured quality. Due to its heavier weave, the less formal nature of Oxford cloth led to its adoption as a cornerstone of Ivy Style.

== Structure ==
Oxford cloth has a basket-weave structure and a lustrous aspect making it a popular fabric for dress shirts. It is usually made of cotton or a cotton blend. Oxford cloth has a 2x1 basket weave, with single weft threads crossing over and under bundles of two warp threads. In basic Oxford cloth, the weft threads are thicker than the warp, creating a slightly looser weave. Pinpoint Oxford cloth uses equally fine threads in both directions.

== Varieties ==
Plain Oxford and Pinpoint Oxford are commonly used for casual shirt designs such as a button-down collar (the 'OCBD' shirt, short for 'Oxford cloth button-down'). Pinpoint Oxford is made from finer yarn and has a tighter weave than plain Oxford. It shows a "pin" or "dot" effect in the texture. Royal Oxford is considered a more formal option. It is suited to business or sporty dress codes.
