= Henley shirt =

Collarless pullover shirt with a button placket at the neck

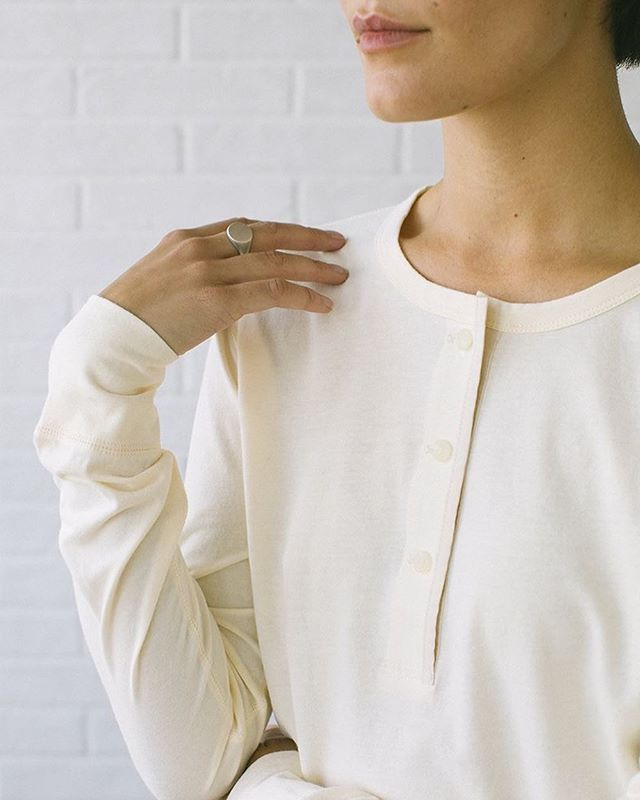
Woman wearing a Henley shirt

A Henley shirt is a collarless pullover shirt, characterized by a round neckline and a placket about 3 to 5 inches (8 to 13 cm) long and usually having 2–5 buttons. It is essentially a collarless polo shirt. The sleeves may be either short or long, and it can be made in almost any fabric, although cotton, cotton-polyester blends, and thermals are by far the most popular. Henley shirts are generally regarded as menswear, but women's versions have appeared as business casual and casual wear as well.

== History ==
Henley shirts were named because they were the traditional uniform of rowers in the English town of Henley-on-Thames. The first Henley Royal Regatta was in 1839.

In his biography of Ralph Lauren, the journalist Michael Gross quotes a New York merchant who recalled showing a vintage shirt to a Ralph Lauren buyer: "I showed this fellow underwear—a three-button long-sleeve shirt by Johnstown Knitting Mills. He said, 'This is a new shirt.' That's where he got the idea for the Henley shirt."

== Fabric ==
Although the most common fabric for Henley is cotton or a cotton/polyester blend, Henleys are also available in linen, merino wool, cashmere, silk and high-tech fabrics. Linen is a great choice for summer, although it is more wrinkled. Merino wool is usually available in long sleeve options, but lightweight short sleeve options exist as well. Usually Henley is sewn from monochromatic fabrics, but some models feature horizontal or vertical stripes, as well as in a checkered pattern.

== Types of Henley ==
=== Long sleeve ===
Henley long sleeves have long sleeves that reach to the wrists and sometimes go a little past the wrist. Sleeve cuffs are often welted, but may be without it. They can be fitted to look slimmer, but can also be loose to look more casual. The long sleeve henley can be made from cotton, polyester, spandex or a blend of materials.

=== Short sleeve ===
A short-sleeved Henley shirt

Henley's short sleeve is more like a t-shirt. It is similar to the long sleeve version in that it does not have a collar, but has a placket and three to five buttons. The neckline is rounded, and the length of the trim ranges from 7.5 to 12.5 centimeters. The significant difference is that this version has short sleeves, similar to the sleeves of a t-shirt.
