= Band collar =

Narrow standing band-shaped collar

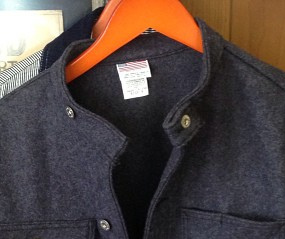
A jacket with a band collar

A band collar is a standing band-shaped collar that encircles the neck without a full turndown or a collar "cape". It can be any height or "stand", but is usually under 2 in (5.1 cm) at the front, so as not to push up into the chin. Variations of the band collar are the clerical collar, the mandarin collar and the cadet collar.

== See also ==
- Collar (clothing)
