= Placket =

Opening in the upper part of certain clothing

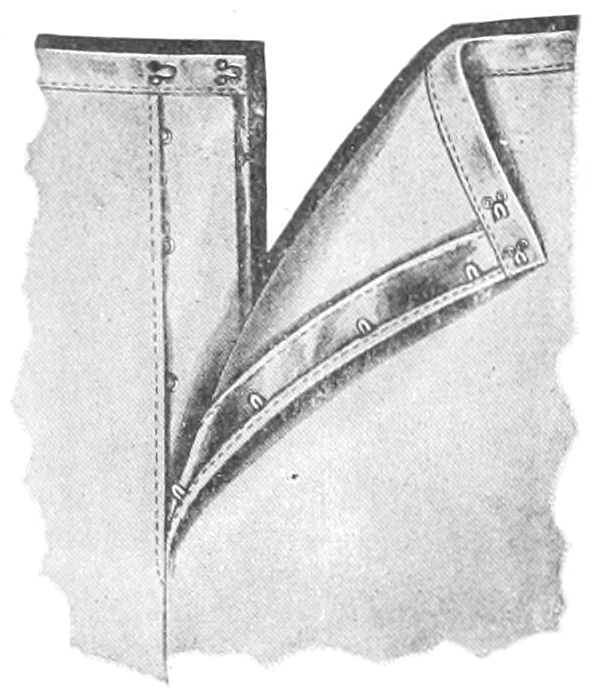
Illustration of a placket

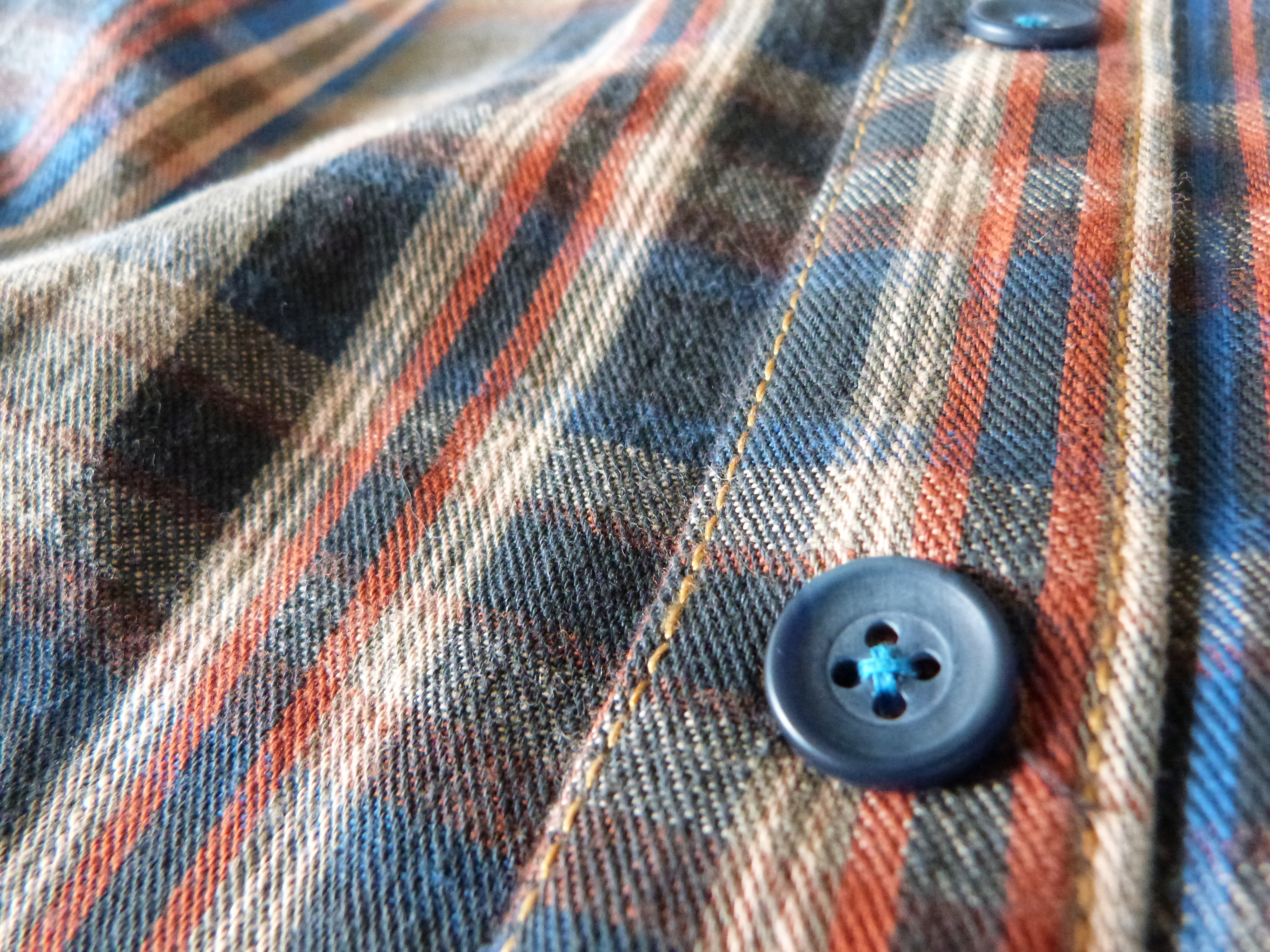
A shirt placket with buttons and topstitching on top

A placket (also spelled placquet) is a finished opening in the upper part of trousers or skirts, or at the neck, front, waist, or sleeve of a garment. It frequently consists of a fold of fabric that is attached to the opening in order for the fasteners (buttons, hooks, snaps) to be sewn to it. In modern usage, the term placket often refers to these double layers of fabric.

Plackets are almost always used to allow clothing to be put on or removed easily but are sometimes used purely as a design element. Modern plackets often contain fabric facings or attached bands to surround and reinforce fasteners such as buttons, snaps, or zippers.

== Construction ==
Plackets are almost always made of more than one layer of fabric, and often have interfacing in between the fabric layers. This is done to give support and strength to the placket fabric because the placket and the fasteners on it are often subjected to stress when the garment is worn. The two sides of the placket often overlap. This is done to protect the wearer from fasteners rubbing against their skin and to hide underlying clothing or undergarments.

== Variations ==
A button-front shirt without a separate pieced placket is called a "French placket". The fabric is simply folded over, and the buttonhole stitching secures the two layers (or three layers if there is an interlining). This method affords a very clean finish, especially if heavily patterned fabrics are being used. This method is normally only used in stiff-fronted formal evening ("white-tie") shirts. However, the normal, separate placket on a shirt gives a more symmetrical appearance.

If the buttons are concealed by a separate flange or flap of the shirting fabric running the length of the placket, it is called a "fly front". The inner placket of a fly front shirt can be made as a less constructed French placket or as a fully constructed regular placket.

== In historical clothing ==
Historically, a placket may also be:

- A decorative front-panel used to fill in the opening of a doublet or gown (later called a stomacher). Also spelled placard.
- A decorative panel or "forepart" (see 1500–1550 in Fashion) attached to a woman's petticoat.
- An opening or slit in a skirt or petticoat to access a separate, hanging pocket.
- A petticoat or skirt pocket.
