= Kahala =

Kahala may refer to:

- Kāhala, Hawaii, neighborhood of Honolulu, Hawaii, United States
  - Kahala Hotel & Resort, a luxury resort in Kāhala, Hawaii
  - Kahala Mall, an enclosed shopping mall in Kāhala, Hawaii
  - Kahala, aloha shirt brand
- Kahala, Harju County, village in Kuusalu Parish, Harju County, Estonia
  - Lake Kahala, lake in Kuusalu Parish
- Kahala, Järva Parish, village in Järva Parish, Järva County, Estonia
- Kahala, Türi Parish, village in Türi Parish, Järva County, Estonia
- Kahala Brands, an American food company
- Kahala, the Hawaiian name of Seriola rivoliana, a fish of Hawaii
- Tomomi Kahala (born 1974), Japanese J-pop singer

== See also ==
- Kabala (disambiguation)
