= Kareda Nature Reserve =

Protected area in Estonia

- Location within Estonia
- Location: Estonia
- Coordinates: 58°56′N 25°46′E
- Area: 363 ha (900 acres)
- Established: 2005

Kareda Nature Reserve is a nature reserve which is located in Järva County, Estonia.

The area of the nature reserve is 363 ha.

The protected area was founded in 2005 to protect valuable habitat types and threatened species in Kareda, Ämbra and Öötla village (all in former Kareda Parish), in Kahala village (former Koigi Parish) and Suurpalu village (Paide Parish).
