= Aloha shirt =

Loose-fitting short-sleeve shirts of brightly colored fabric in tropical prints

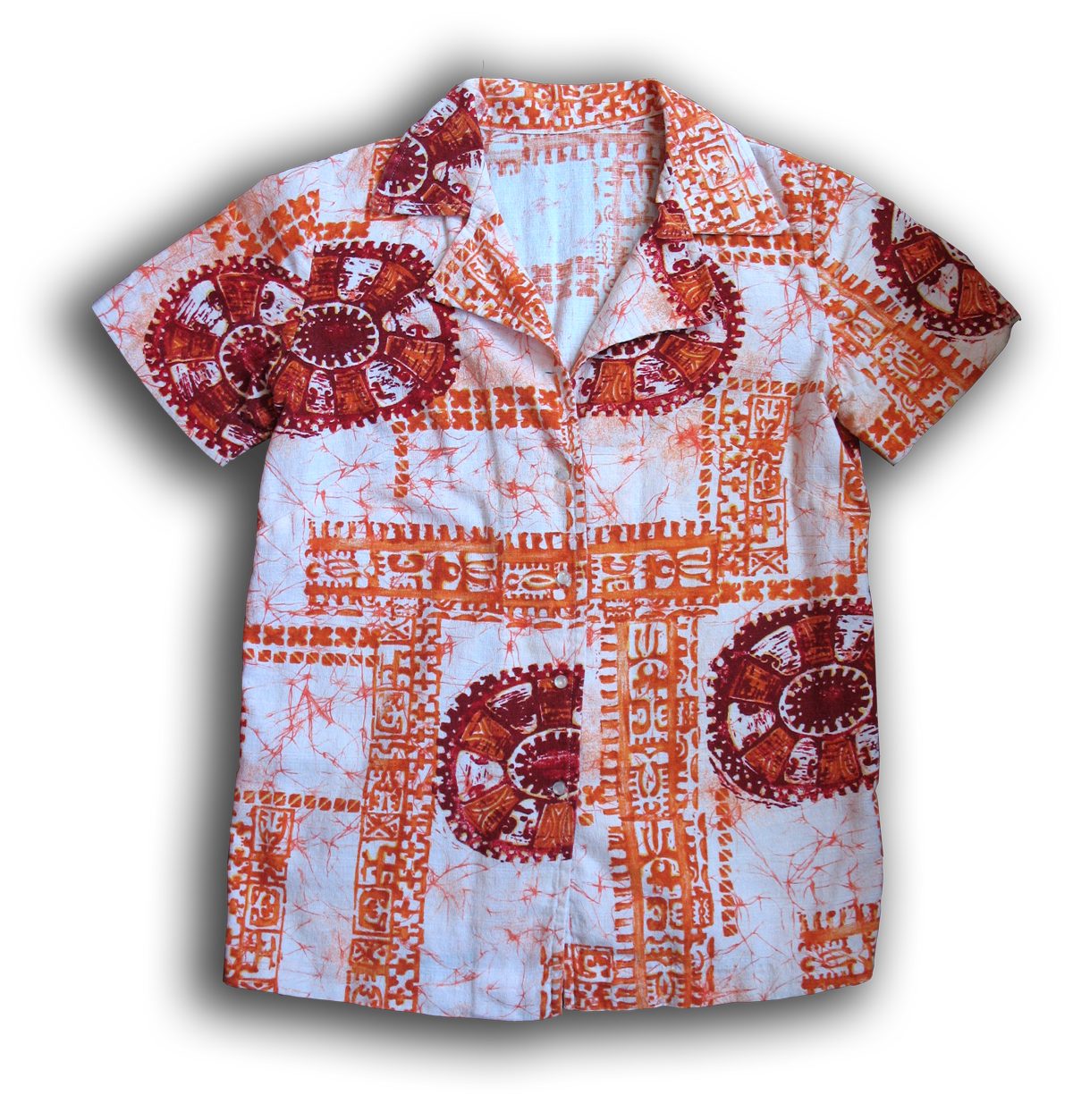
A vintage aloha shirt, circa 1960

The aloha shirt (Hawaiian: palaka aloha), also referred to as a Hawaiian shirt, is a style of dress shirt originating in Hawaii. They are collared and buttoned dress shirts, usually short-sleeved and made from printed fabric. They are traditionally worn untucked, but can be worn tucked into the waist of trousers. They are worn casually or as informal business attire in Hawaii.

"Aloha Friday", or Casual Friday, a now-common tradition of celebrating the end of the work week by wearing more casual attire on Fridays, initially grew out of an effort to promote aloha shirts.

== Design ==
Aloha dress shirts are printed, mostly short-sleeved, and collared. They almost always have buttons, sometimes for the entire length of the shirt or at least up to the chest. They usually have a left chest pocket sewn in, often with attention to ensure the printed pattern remains continuous. Aloha shirts may be worn by men or women. Women's aloha shirts usually have a lower-cut, v-neck style.

The lower hems are straight, and the shirts are often worn with the shirt-tails hanging out, rather than tucked in. Wearing an untucked shirt was possibly influenced by the local Filipinos who wore shirt-tail out, and called these bayau meaning "friend". (Note: Fundaburk (1965), II: 4, p. 169, apud Schimtt (1980)) (Note: Rooted perhaps to the Filipino barong tagalog.) Wearing it untucked or tucked depends on personal taste; it carries the same connotations of tucking or untucking a polo shirt. In the 1950s, the shirt became allowed as business attire for aloha week, but only if worn tucked in.

Traditional men's aloha shirts are usually adorned with traditional Hawaiian quilt designs, tapa designs, and simple floral patterns in more muted colors. Contemporary aloha shirts may have prints that do not feature any traditional Hawaiian quilt or floral designs but instead may incorporate drinks, palm trees, surf boards or other island tropical elements in a similar form as the traditional aloha shirt.

It has been observed that locals (kamaʻāina) tended to shy away from the garishness of aloha shirts as "too wild" when they first appeared, (Note: Linda B. Arthur in interview, Keane & Quinn (2010), apud Hughes (2017), p. 284) whereas tourists embraced wearing designs of many bright colors. An example of the type of shirt the locals may prefer includes the "reverse print"; these shirts are often printed on the interior, resulting in the muted color on the exterior.

== History ==
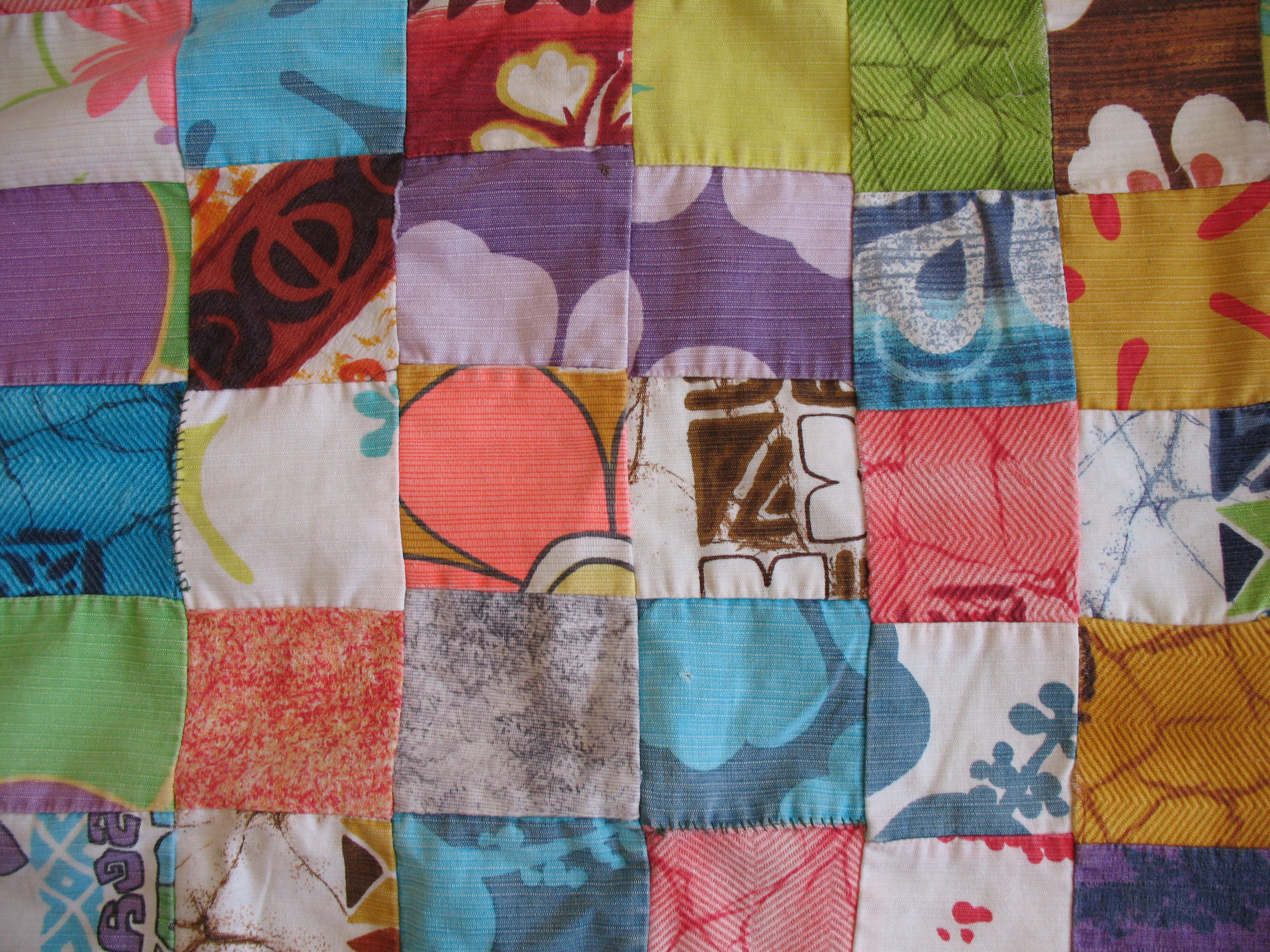
Patchwork quilt made from vintage aloha shirt fabric, circa 1960s

According to some sources, the origin of aloha shirts can be traced to the 1920s or the early 1930s, when the Honolulu-based dry goods store "Musa-Shiya the Shirtmaker" under the proprietorship of Kōichirō Miyamoto, started making shirts out of colorful Japanese prints (especially kasuri). (Note: Musa-Shiya was established by Japanese immigrant Chōtarō Miyamoto (宮本長太郎) in 1904. After Miyamoto's death in 1915, the shop was renamed "Musa-Shiya Shoten" (Japanese title: 武蔵屋呉服店 (Musashi-ya-gofukuten) by his son Kōichirō Miyamoto (宮本孝一郎), who sewed Aloha shirts using Japanese kimono fabrics and was allegedly the first to sell shirts of this kind.) It has also been contended that the aloha shirt was devised in the early 1930s by Chinese merchant Ellery Chun of "King-Smith Clothiers and Dry Goods", a store in Waikiki. Although this claim has been described as a myth reinforced by repeated telling, Chun may have been the first to mass-produce or to maintain the ready-to-wear in stock to be sold off the shelf.

The name "aloha shirt" appeared later. By 1935 and 1936, the word aloha was being attached to various sorts of Hawaiian products, so calling the garments "aloha shirts" was hardly original. The term aloha shirt first appeared in print in an advertisement for Musa-Shiya in the June 28, 1935 issue of The Honolulu Advertiser newspaper. However, Ellery Chun is sometimes credited for coining the term, perhaps in 1933; Chun's store reportedly carried window signs that said "aloha shirts". The term "aloha sportswear" was registered as a trademark by Chun's company in 1936, followed by Chun trademarking "Aloha Shirt" in 1937 and owning the rights to this appellation for the next 20 years.

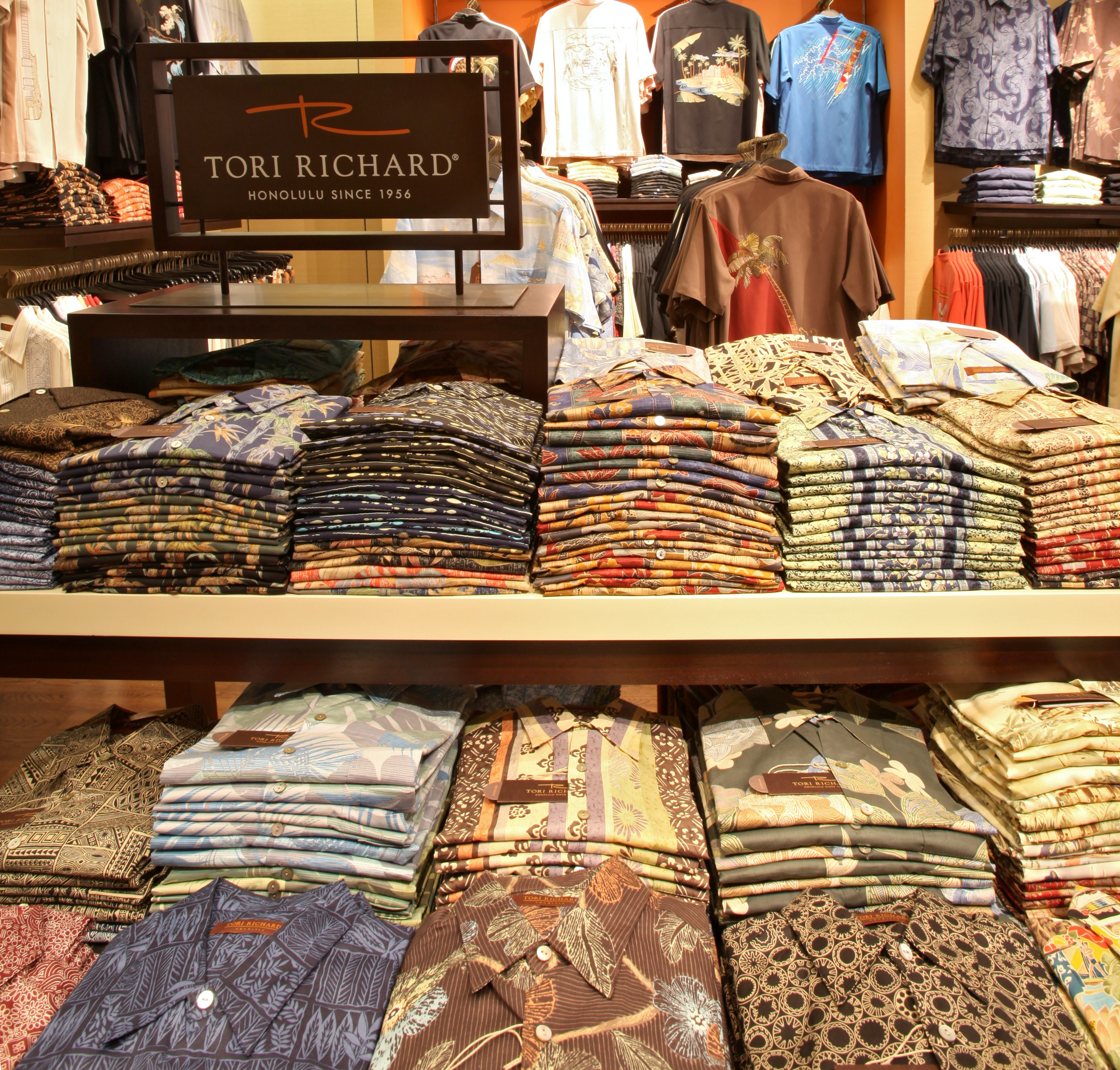
Tori Richard aloha shirts in a store

Within years, major designer labels sprang up all over Hawaii and began manufacturing and selling aloha shirts en masse. By the end of the 1930s, 450 people were employed in an industry worth $600,000 annually. Two notable manufacturers of this period are Kamehameha and Branfleet (later Kahala), both founded in 1936. Retail chains in Hawaii, including some based on the mainland, may mass-produce a single aloha shirt design for employee uniforms.

After World War II, many servicemen and servicewomen returned to the United States from Asia and the Pacific islands with aloha shirts made in Hawaii since the 1930s. One significant manufacturer was Shaheen, which began business in 1948. Following Hawaii's statehood in 1959, when extant tropical prints came to be regarded as rather tacky, designer Alfred Shaheen became noted for producing aloha shirts of higher chic and quality, and Elvis Presley wore a Shaheen-designed red aloha on the album cover for Blue Hawaii (1961). In 1956, Tori Richard, a well-known brand of alohas was established. Spooner's of Waikiki, precursor of Reyn Spooner, also established business in 1956.

=== Exports ===
Garments manufactured in Hawaii could bear "Made in Hawaii" labels before statehood (1959), and even afterwards, their sales to mainland United States continued to be referred to as "exports". Aloha shirts tend to be referred to as "Hawaiian shirts" by the populace from the mainland United States, and are often brilliantly colored with floral patterns or generic Polynesian motifs. The aloha shirt is currently the premier textile export of the Hawaii manufacturing industry.

== Aloha dress codes ==
=== Aloha Week ===
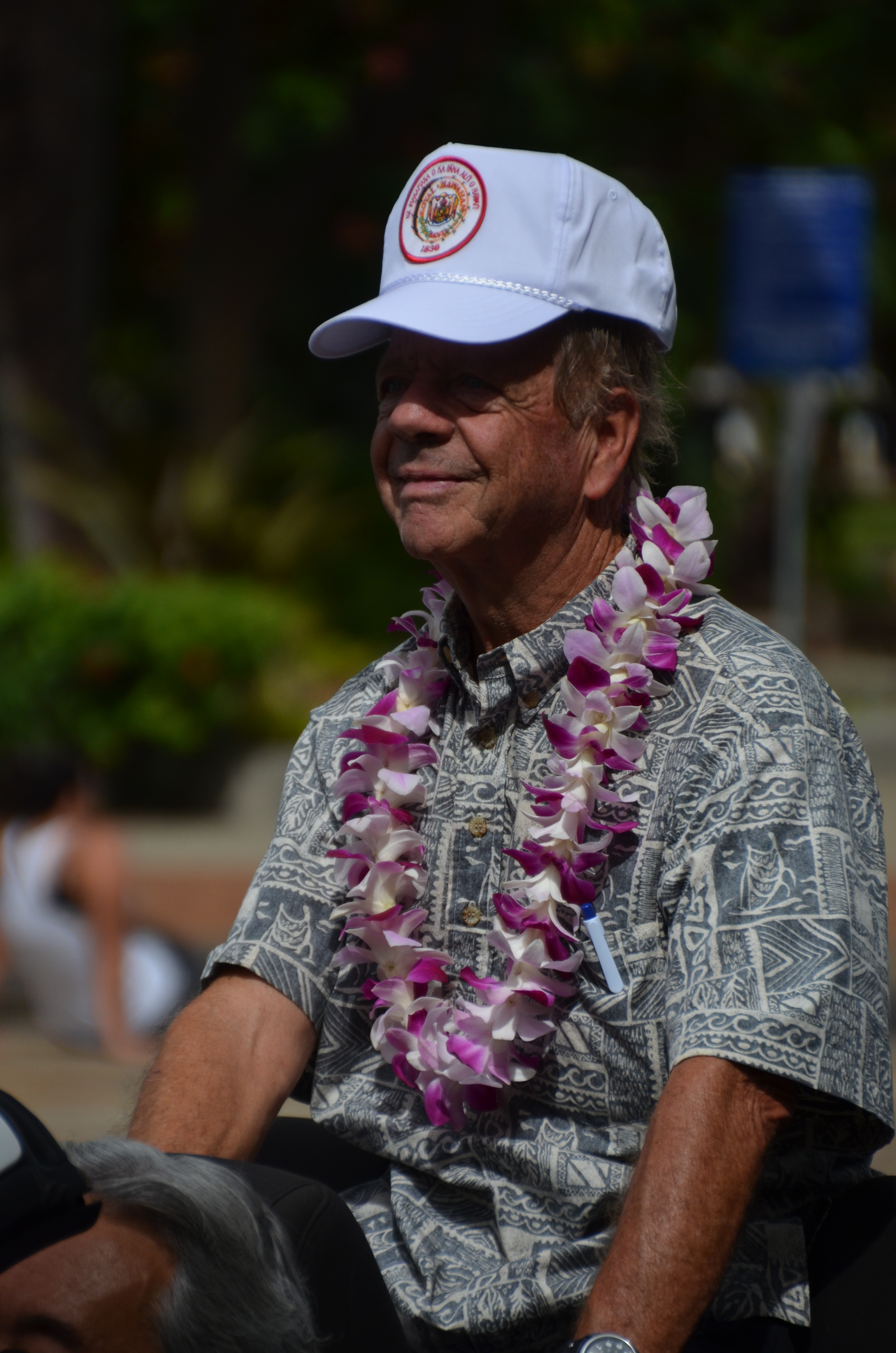
Man with a typical aloha shirt during the Aloha Festivals Floral Parade 2012

In 1946, the Honolulu Chamber of Commerce funded a study of aloha shirts and designs for comfortable business clothing worn during the hot Hawaiian summers. The City and County of Honolulu passed a resolution allowing their employees to wear sport shirts from June–October. City employees were not allowed to wear aloha shirts for business until the creation of the Aloha Week festival in 1947.

The Aloha Week festival was motivated by both cultural and economic concerns: First held at Ala Moana Park in October, the festival revived interest in ancient Hawaiian music, dancing, sports, and traditions. There was a holoku ball, a floral parade, and a makahiki festival attended by 8,000 people. Economically, the week-long event first attracted visitors during October – traditionally a slow month for tourism – which benefited the Hawaiian fashion industry as they supplied the muʻumuʻu and aloha shirts worn for the celebration. Aloha Week expanded in 1974 to six islands, and was lengthened to a month. In 1991, Aloha Week was renamed to Aloha Festivals.

In the end, Aloha Week had a direct influence on the resulting demand for alohawear, and was responsible for supporting local clothing manufacturing: locals needed the clothing for the festivals, and soon people in Hawaii began wearing the clothing in greater numbers on more of a daily basis. Hawaii's fashion industry was relieved, as they were initially worried that popular clothing from the mainland United States would eventually replace aloha attire.

=== Aloha Friday ===
In 1962, a professional manufacturing association known as the Hawaiian Fashion Guild began to promote aloha shirts and clothing for use in the workplace, particularly as business attire. In a campaign called "Operation Liberation", the Guild distributed two aloha shirts to every member of the Hawaii House of Representatives and the Hawaii Senate. Subsequently, a resolution passed in the Senate recommending aloha attire be worn throughout the summer, beginning on Lei Day. The wording of the resolution spoke of letting "the male populace return to 'aloha attire' during the summer months for the sake of comfort and in support of the 50th state's garment industry".

In 1965, Bill Foster Sr., president of the Hawaii Fashion Guild, led the organization in a campaign lobbying for "Aloha Friday", a day employers would allow men to wear aloha shirts on the last business day of the week a few months out of the year. Aloha Friday officially began in 1966, and young adults of the 1960s embraced the style, replacing the formal business wear favored by previous generations. By 1970, aloha wear had gained acceptance in Hawaii as business attire for any day of the week. Unlike the court dress required in most jurisdictions, attorneys in Hawaii may be allowed to wear aloha shirts in court, though this varies among individual courts.

Hawaii's custom of Aloha Friday slowly spread east to California, continuing around the globe until the 1990s, when it became known as Casual Friday. Today in Hawaii, alohawear is worn as business attire for any day of the week, and "Aloha Friday" is generally used to refer to the last day of the work week. Now considered Hawaii's term for "Thank God It's Friday" (TGIF), the phrase was used by Kimo Kahoano and Paul Natto in their 1982 song, "It's Aloha Friday, No Work 'til Monday", heard every Friday on Hawaii radio stations across the state.

=== Aloha attire ===
The related concept of "aloha attire" stems from the aloha shirt. Semi-formal functions such as weddings, birthday parties, and dinners are often designated as "aloha attire", meaning that men wear aloha shirts and women wear muumuu or other tropical prints. Because Hawaii tends to be more casual, it is rarely appropriate to attend such functions in full evening wear like on the mainland; instead, aloha attire is seen as a happy medium between excessive formality and casual wear (i.e., business casual).

== See also ==
- Camp shirt – The "parent" shirt type; see for subtypes and similar shirts
- Jams – Aloha shirt brand
- Kahala – Aloha shirt brand based in Hawaii
- Reyn Spooner – Aloha shirt brand based in California
- Kente cloth – African traditional clothing pattern similar to the Aloha shirt in style
- Kariyushi shirt - The garment that evolved after the Aloha shirt was introduced to Okinawa Prefecture.
