= List of twin towns and sister cities in Finland =

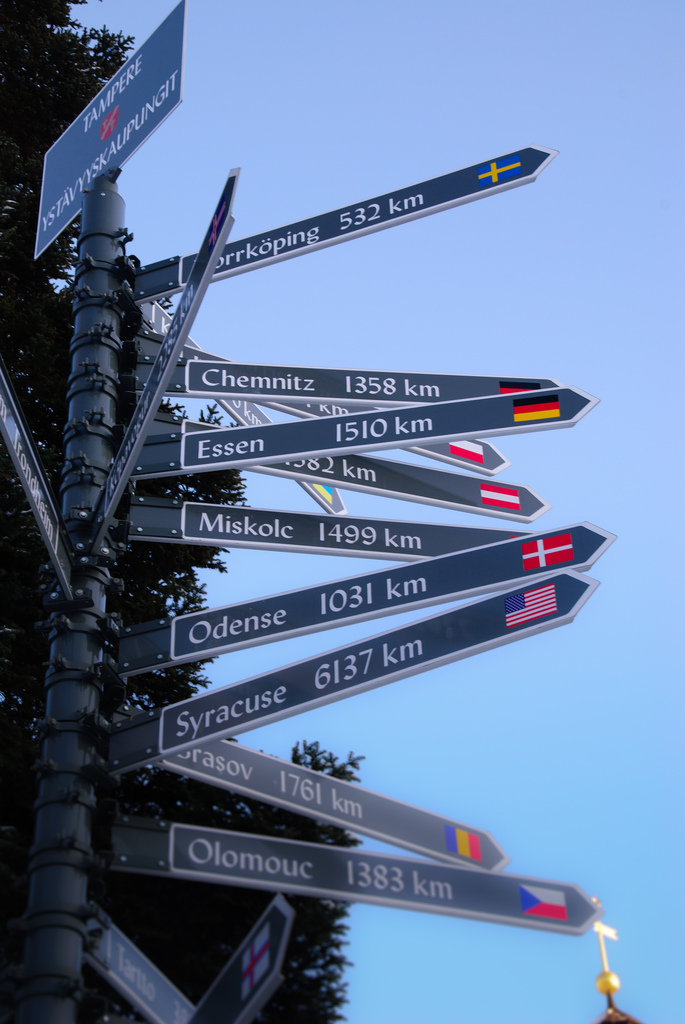
Twin towns of Tampere

Map of Finland

This is a list of municipalities in Finland having standing links to local communities in other countries known as "town twinning" (usually in Europe) or "sister cities" (usually in the rest of the world). In Finnish the terms ystävyyskaupungit, ystävyyskunnat are used.

Due to Russian invasion of Ukraine, many Finnish municipalities have severed ties with their Russian twin towns. The oldest town twinnings between Finnish and now Russian town are from 1950s.

== A ==
Ähtäri

- Audru (Pärnu), Estonia
- Dujiangyan, China
- Lycksele, Sweden

Asikkala is a member of the Douzelage, a town twinning association of towns across the European Union. Asikkala also has one other twin town.

Douzelage

- Agros, Cyprus
- Altea, Spain
- Bad Kötzting, Germany
- Bellagio, Italy
- (Republic of Ireland) Bundoran, Ireland
- Chojna, Poland
- Granville, France
- Holstebro, Denmark
- Houffalize, Belgium
- Judenburg, Austria
- Kőszeg, Hungary
- Marsaskala, Malta
- Meerssen, Netherlands
- Niederanven, Luxembourg
- Oxelösund, Sweden
- Preveza, Greece
- Rokiškis, Lithuania
- Rovinj, Croatia
- Sesimbra, Portugal
- Sherborne, England, United Kingdom
- Sigulda, Latvia
- Siret, Romania
- Škofja Loka, Slovenia
- Sušice, Czech Republic
- Tryavna, Bulgaria
- Türi, Estonia
- Zvolen, Slovakia

Other

- Prienai, Lithuania

== E ==
Espoo

- Esztergom, Hungary
- Irving, United States
- Køge, Denmark
- Kongsberg, Norway
- Kristianstad, Sweden
- Nõmme (Tallinn), Estonia
- Shanghai, China
- Skagafjörður, Iceland

Eura

- Askersund, Sweden
- Harku, Estonia

Eurajoki

- Weener, Germany

== F ==
Forssa

- Gödöllő, Hungary
- Sarpsborg, Norway
- Sault Ste. Marie, Canada
- Södertälje, Sweden
- Struer, Denmark
- Tierp, Sweden

== H ==
Hämeenlinna

- Bærum, Norway
- Celle, Germany
- Frederiksberg, Denmark
- Hafnarfjörður, Iceland
- Püspökladány, Hungary
- Sumy, Ukraine
- Tartu, Estonia
- Toruń, Poland
- Uppsala, Sweden
- Weimar, Germany

Hamina

- Falun, Sweden
- Paide, Estonia
- Røros, Norway

Hankasalmi

- Häädemeeste, Estonia
- Karmøy, Norway
- Mjölby, Sweden

Hanko

- Gentofte, Denmark
- Haapsalu, Estonia
- Halmstad, Sweden
- Stord, Norway

Heinävesi

- Körmend, Hungary

Heinola

- Karlshamn, Sweden
- Peine (district), Germany
- Piešťany, Slovakia

Helsinki does not sign any formal town twinning treaties.

Huittinen

- Frederiksværk (Halsnæs), Denmark
- Hoyerswerda, Germany
- Keila, Estonia
- Odda, Norway
- Stenungsund, Sweden

Hyvinkää

- Eigersund, Norway
- Hersfeld-Rotenburg (district), Germany
- Kecskemét, Hungary
- Kunshan, China
- Motala, Sweden

== I ==
Ii

- Bjurholm, Sweden
- Kronstadt, Russia

Iisalmi

- Guldborgsund, Denmark
- Kirishi, Russia
- Pécel, Hungary
- Võru, Estonia

Imatra

- Beihai, China
- Jiaxing, China
- Ludvika, Sweden
- Narva-Jõesuu, Estonia
- Salzgitter, Germany
- Szigetvár, Hungary
- Tikhvin, Russia
- Zvolen, Slovakia

Inari

- Handan, China
- Kola, Russia
- Nesseby, Norway
- Sør-Varanger, Norway

Ingå

- Fredensborg, Denmark
- Håbo, Sweden
- Nittedal, Norway

Isokyrö

- Vännäs, Sweden

== J ==
Jakobstad

- Asker, Norway
- Bünde, Germany
- Eslöv, Sweden
- Garðabær, Iceland
- Jamestown, United States
- Jūrmala, Latvia
- Rudersdal, Denmark

Jämijärvi

- Geisenfeld, Germany
- Paide, Estonia

Järvenpää

- Buchholz in der Nordheide, Germany
- Jõgeva County, Estonia
- Lørenskog, Norway
- Pasadena, United States
- Rødovre, Denmark
- Täby, Sweden
- Vác, Hungary
- Volkhov, Russia

Joensuu

- Ísafjörður, Iceland
- Hof, Germany
- Linköping, Sweden
- Petrozavodsk, Russia
- Tønsberg, Norway
- Vilnius, Lithuania

Jokioinen

- Põhja-Sakala, Estonia

Juupajoki

- Nore og Uvdal, Norway
- Surahammar, Sweden
- Wahlstedt, Germany

Jyväskylä

- Debrecen, Hungary
- Esbjerg, Denmark
- Eskilstuna, Sweden
- Fjarðabyggð, Iceland
- Mudanjiang, China
- Niiza, Japan
- Potsdam, Germany
- Poznań, Poland
- Stavanger, Norway
- Tartu Parish, Estonia
- Yaroslavl, Russia

== K ==
Kaarina

- Enköping, Sweden
- Jõgeva, Estonia
- Sovetsky, Russia
- Szentes, Hungary

Kajaani

- Jiujiang, China
- Marquette, United States
- Nyíregyháza, Hungary
- Östersund, Sweden
- Rostov-on-Don, Russia
- Schwalm-Eder (district), Germany

Kalajoki

- Izumo, Japan
- Sosnovy Bor, Russia
- Vansbro, Sweden

Kangasala

- Eiði, Faroe Islands
- Fjallabyggð, Iceland
- Herning, Denmark
- Holmestrand, Norway
- Husby, Germany
- Jomala, Åland Islands, Finland
- Paamiut, Greenland
- Räpina, Estonia
- Vänersborg, Sweden
- Zulpich, Germany

Kannus is a member of the Charter of European Rural Communities, a town twinning association across the European Union. Kannus also has one other twin town.

Charter of European Rural Communities

- Bienvenida, Spain
- Bièvre, Belgium
- Bucine, Italy
- (Republic of Ireland) Cashel, Ireland
- Cissé, France
- Desborough, England, United Kingdom
- Esch (Haaren), Netherlands
- Hepstedt, Germany
- Ibănești, Romania
- Kandava (Tukums), Latvia
- Kolindros, Greece
- Lassee, Austria
- Medzev, Slovakia
- Næstved, Denmark
- Nagycenk, Hungary
- Nadur, Malta
- Ockelbo, Sweden
- Pano Lefkara, Cyprus
- Põlva, Estonia
- Samuel (Soure), Portugal
- Starý Poddvorov, Czech Republic
- Strzyżów, Poland
- Svoge, Bulgaria
- Tisno, Croatia
- Troisvierges, Luxembourg
- Žagarė (Joniškis), Lithuania

Other

- Ustyuzhna, Russia

Karvia

- Viru-Nigula, Estonia

Kauhava

- Jevnaker, Norway
- Lemvig, Denmark
- Rygge, Norway
- Skærbæk (Tønder), Denmark
- Þorlákshöfn, Iceland
- Vimmerby, Sweden

Kauniainen

- Danderyd, Sweden
- Pirita (Tallinn), Estonia

Kemi

- Liptovský Mikuláš, Slovakia
- Luleå, Sweden
- Newtownards, Northern Ireland, United Kingdom
- Székesfehérvár, Hungary
- Tromsø, Norway
- Wismar, Germany

Kemijärvi

- Kandalaksha, Russia
- Sōbetsu, Japan
- Vadsø, Norway
- Vardø, Norway

Kerava

- Aschersleben, Germany
- Arumeru, Tanzania
- Keila, Estonia
- Kristiansand, Norway
- Ogre, Latvia
- Reykjanesbær, Iceland
- Solt, Hungary
- Trollhättan, Sweden
- Vladimir, Russia

Keuruu

- Jõgeva, Estonia
- Langeland, Denmark
- Skaun, Norway
- Szarvas, Hungary
- Tingsryd, Sweden
- Uglich, Russia

Kirkkonummi

- Paldiski (Lääne-Harju), Estonia
- Sundbyberg, Sweden

Kokemäki

- Falköping, Sweden
- Lier, Norway
- Mariagerfjord, Denmark
- Põltsamaa, Estonia

Kokkola

- Averøy, Norway
- Boldog, Hungary
- Fitchburg, United States
- Fredericia, Denmark
- Fushun, China
- Greater Sudbury, Canada
- Hatvan, Hungary
- Härnösand, Sweden
- Järva, Estonia
- Kristiansund, Norway
- Marijampolė, Lithuania
- Mörbylånga, Sweden
- Ratingen, Germany
- Ullånger (Kramfors), Sweden

Korsholm

- Mandal, Norway
- Middelfart, Denmark
- Oskarshamn, Sweden
- Tõstamaa (Järva), Estonia
- Varbla (Lääneranna), Estonia

Kotka

- Fredrikstad, Norway
- Gdynia, Poland
- Glostrup, Denmark
- Greifswald, Germany
- Klaipėda, Lithuania
- Landskrona, Sweden
- Lübeck, Germany
- Mykolaiv, Ukraine
- Taizhou, China
- Tallinn, Estonia

Kouvola

- Balatonfüred, Hungary
- Mülheim an der Ruhr, Germany
- Poltava, Ukraine

Kristinestad

- Åndalsnes (Rauma), Norway
- Rosenholm (Syddjurs), Denmark
- Sala, Sweden

Kuhmo

- Kostomuksha, Russia
- Oroszlány, Hungary
- Robertsfors, Sweden
- Šaľa, Slovakia

Kuopio

- Besançon, France
- Bodø, Norway
- Castrop-Rauxel, Germany
- Craiova, Romania
- Gera, Germany
- Győr, Hungary
- Jönköping, Sweden
- Minneapolis, United States
- Opole, Poland
- Pudong (Shanghai), China
- Svendborg, Denmark
- Winnipeg, Canada

Kustavi

- Faaborg-Midtfyn, Denmark
- Hole, Norway
- Strandabyggð, Iceland
- Tanum, Sweden

Kuusamo

- Loukhi, Russia
- Sanya, China

== L ==
Lahti

- Akureyri, Iceland
- Ålesund, Norway
- Dolni Dabnik, Bulgaria
- Deyang, China
- Garmisch-Partenkirchen, Germany
- Narva, Estonia
- Norberg, Sweden
- Pécs, Hungary
- Randers, Denmark
- Suhl, Germany
- Tamsalu (Tapa), Estonia
- Västerås, Sweden
- Worcestershire, England, United Kingdom
- Wuxi, China
- Zaporizhia, Ukraine
- Zhangjiakou, China

Laihia

- Kil, Sweden
- Tõrva, Estonia
- Trysil, Norway

Lappeenranta

- Chernihiv, Ukraine
- Drammen, Norway
- Klin, Russia
- Kolding, Denmark
- Lake Worth, United States
- Örebro, Sweden
- Rakvere, Estonia
- Schwäbisch Hall, Germany
- Stykkishólmur, Iceland
- Szombathely, Hungary

Lapua

- Hagfors, Sweden
- Hohenlockstedt, Germany
- Lantana, United States
- Rakvere, Estonia
- Kiskőrös, Hungary

Laukaa

- Modum, Norway
- Östra Göinge, Sweden
- Stevns, Denmark

Lempäälä

- Castiglione del Lago, Italy
- Øvre Eiker, Norway
- Priozersky District, Russia
- Tapolca, Hungary
- Ulricehamn, Sweden
- Upplands-Bro, Sweden

Leppävirta

- Dovre, Norway
- Orissaare (Saaremaa), Estonia
- Schwerte, Germany
- Storfors, Sweden

Lieto

- Herlev, Denmark
- Höganäs, Sweden
- Komárno, Slovakia
- Komárom, Hungary
- Nesodden, Norway
- Nõva (Lääne-Nigula), Estonia
- Seltjarnarnes, Iceland

Liperi

- Aalborg, Denmark
- Büchen, Germany
- Orsa, Sweden
- Rendalen, Norway
- Saku, Estonia

Lohja

- Aabenraa, Denmark
- Lidingö, Sweden
- Ringerike, Norway
- Skagaströnd, Iceland
- Växjö, Sweden

Loimaa

- Frogn, Norway
- Jõhvi, Estonia
- Mosfellsbær, Iceland
- Norddjurs, Denmark
- Skien, Norway
- Staraya Russa, Russia
- Thisted, Denmark
- Türi, Estonia
- Uddevalla, Sweden

== M ==
Mäntsälä

- Vara, Sweden

Mänttä-Vilppula

- Bornholm, Denmark
- Høyanger, Norway
- Põltsamaa, Estonia
- Ronneby, Sweden
- Shijingshan (Beijing), China
- Simmern, Germany
- Stary Oskol, Russia

Mariehamn

- Gotland, Sweden
- Kópavogur, Iceland
- Kragerø, Norway
- Kuressaare (Saaremaa), Estonia
- Lomonosov, Russia
- Tórshavn, Faroe Islands
- Valkeakoski, Finland

Mikkeli

- Békéscsaba, Hungary
- Borås, Sweden
- Luga, Russia
- Mõisaküla, Estonia
- Molde, Norway
- Ostholstein (district), Germany
- Vejle, Denmark

Muurame

- Alatskivi (Peipsiääre), Estonia
- Vinje, Norway

Mynämäki

- Paikuse (Pärnu), Estonia

== N ==
Naantali

- Nordfyn, Denmark
- Puck, Poland
- Svelvik, Norway
- Vadstena, Sweden

Nakkila

- Boksitogorsk, Russia
- Hudiksvall, Sweden

Närpes

- Akranes, Iceland
- Bamble, Norway
- Roshchino, Russia
- Tønder, Denmark
- Västervik, Sweden

Nivala

- Zirc, Hungary

Nokia

- Blönduós, Iceland
- Horsens, Denmark
- Karlstad, Sweden
- Moss, Norway

Nurmes

- Laholm, Sweden
- Ørsta, Norway
- Segezha, Russia
- Volda, Norway

Nurmijärvi

- Lilla Edet, Sweden

Nykarleby

- Hammel (Favrskov), Denmark
- Sollefteå, Sweden
- Steinkjer, Norway

== O ==
Orimattila

- Kościelisko, Poland
- Durbuy, Belgium
- Kozármisleny, Hungary
- Östhammar, Sweden
- Tvrdošín, Slovakia
- Valga, Estonia
- Valka, Latvia

Oulu

- Alta, Norway
- Arkhangelsk, Russia
- Astana, Kazakhstan
- Boden, Sweden
- Bursa, Turkey
- Halle, Germany
- Hangzhou, China
- Kronstadt, Russia
- Leverkusen, Germany
- Matera, Italy
- Odesa, Ukraine
- Siófok, Hungary
- Szigetszentmiklós, Hungary

Outokumpu

- Kohtla-Järve, Estonia
- Schöningen, Germany

== P ==
Paimio

- Ås, Norway
- Audru (Pärnu), Estonia
- Ljungby, Sweden
- Odenthal, Germany
- Zelenogorsk, Russia

Pargas

- Chudovo, Russia
- Haninge, Sweden
- Hiiumaa, Estonia
- Ulstein, Norway

Parkano

- Monselice, Italy
- Vò, Italy

Pirkkala

- Gladsaxe, Denmark
- Ski, Norway
- Solna, Sweden
- Valjala (Saaremaa), Estonia

Pori

- Bremerhaven, Germany
- Eger, Hungary
- Kołobrzeg, Poland
- Mâcon, France
- Porsgrunn, Norway
- Riga, Latvia
- Sønderborg, Denmark
- Stralsund, Germany
- Sundsvall, Sweden

Porvoo

- Dalvíkurbyggð, Iceland
- Dinkelsbühl, Germany
- Hamar, Norway
- Hancock, United States
- Kamień Pomorski, Poland
- Lund, Sweden
- Viborg, Denmark
- Viimsi, Estonia
- Viljandi, Estonia

Pudasjärvi

- Kronstadt, Russia
- Loukhi, Russia
- Vindeln, Sweden

Pyhäjoki

- Sosnovy Bor, Russia

Pyhtää

- Haljala, Estonia
- Nacka, Sweden

== R ==
Raahe

- Košice, Slovakia
- Märjamaa, Estonia
- Rana, Norway
- Skellefteå, Sweden

Raisio

- Csongrád, Hungary
- Elmshorn, Germany
- Kingisepp, Russia
- Padise (Lääne-Harju), Estonia
- Sigtuna, Sweden

Rauma

- Boynton Beach, United States
- Gävle, Sweden
- Gjøvik, Norway
- Kaposvár, Hungary
- Næstved, Denmark
- Zhuhai, China

Rautalampi

- Torsby, Sweden

Riihimäki

- Aalborg, Denmark
- Bad Segeberg, Germany
- Jonava, Lithuania
- Karlskoga, Sweden
- Lillestrøm, Norway
- Norðurþing, Iceland
- Olaine, Latvia
- Real Sitio de San Ildefonso, Spain
- Szolnok, Hungary

Rovaniemi

- Ajka, Hungary
- Alanya, Turkey
- Cadillac, United States
- Grindavík, Iceland
- Harbin, China
- Kassel, Germany
- Kiruna, Sweden
- Narvik, Norway
- Neustrelitz, Germany
- Olsztyn, Poland
- Sankt Johann in Tirol, Austria
- Veszprém, Hungary

== S ==
Saarijärvi

- Gran, Norway
- Kungsbacka, Sweden
- Trittau (Amt), Germany

Salla

- Arjeplog, Sweden
- Båtsfjord, Norway
- Kovdor, Russia
- Wildau, Germany

Salo

- Anija, Estonia
- Elva, Estonia
- Gárdony, Hungary
- Nagykanizsa, Hungary
- Odder, Denmark
- Puchheim, Germany
- Qingdao, China
- Rzhev, Russia
- St. Anthony, United States

Sastamala

- Halden, Norway
- Kashin, Russia
- Kuressaare (Saaremaa), Estonia
- Pihtla (Saaremaa), Estonia
- Ringsted, Denmark
- Skövde, Sweden
- Vásárosnamény, Hungary

Savonlinna

- Árborg, Iceland
- Arendal, Norway
- Budavár (Budapest), Hungary
- Detmold, Germany
- Kalmar, Sweden
- Torzhok, Russia

Seinäjoki

- Jiangjin, China
- Koszalin, Poland
- Schweinfurt, Germany
- Sopron, Hungary
- Thunder Bay, Canada

Siilinjärvi

- Elverum, Norway
- Hajdúböszörmény, Hungary
- Kamennogorsk, Russia
- Sunne, Sweden

Sipoo

- Aurskog-Høland, Norway
- Frederikssund, Denmark
- Kumla, Sweden
- Kuusalu, Estonia

Siuntio

- Fellingsbro (Lindesberg), Sweden
- Türi, Estonia

Sodankylä

- Berlevåg, Norway
- Heiligenblut am Großglockner, Austria
- Kola, Russia
- Norsjö, Sweden
- Révfülöp, Hungary

== T ==
Tampere

- Brașov, Romania
- Chemnitz, Germany
- Essen, Germany
- Guangzhou, China
- Kaunas, Lithuania
- Kyiv, Ukraine
- Klaksvík, Faroe Islands
- Kópavogur, Iceland
- Linz, Austria
- Łódź, Poland
- Miskolc, Hungary
- Mwanza, Tanzania
- Norrköping, Sweden
- Odense, Denmark
- Olomouc, Czech Republic
- Syracuse, United States
- Tartu, Estonia
- Trondheim, Norway

Teuva

- Cieszyn, Poland
- Orust, Sweden

Toivakka

- Kambja, Estonia

Tornio

- Devizes, England, United Kingdom
- Hammerfest, Norway
- Ikast-Brande, Denmark
- Kirovsk, Russia
- Szekszárd, Hungary
- Vetlanda, Sweden

Turku

- Aarhus, Denmark
- Bergen, Norway
- Bratislava, Slovakia
- Cologne, Germany
- Constanța, Romania
- Florence, Italy
- Gdańsk, Poland
- Gothenburg, Sweden
- Rostock, Germany
- Szeged, Hungary
- Tartu, Estonia
- Varna, Bulgaria

Tuusula

- Augustów, Poland
- Celle (district), Germany
- Hvidovre, Denmark
- Oppegård, Norway
- Sollentuna, Sweden
- Vinni, Estonia

== U ==
Utajärvi

- Muhu, Estonia

Uusikaupunki

- Antsla, Estonia
- Haderslev, Denmark
- Sandefjord, Norway
- Szentendre, Hungary
- Varberg, Sweden

== V ==
Vaasa

- Bellingham, United States
- Harstad, Norway
- Helsingør, Denmark
- Kiel, Germany
- Malmö, Sweden
- Morogoro, Tanzania
- Pärnu, Estonia
- Schwerin, Germany
- Šumperk, Czech Republic
- Umeå, Sweden

Valkeakoski

- Gotland, Sweden
- Jelenia Góra, Poland
- Kragerø, Norway
- Mariehamn, Åland Islands, Finland
- Nanchang, China
- Sokol, Russia
- Vechelde, Germany

Vantaa

- Askim, Norway
- Boryspil, Ukraine
- Frankfurt an der Oder, Germany
- Huddinge, Sweden
- Jinan, China
- Mateh Yehuda, Israel
- Mladá Boleslav, Czech Republic
- Rastatt (district), Germany
- Salgótarján, Hungary
- Słupsk, Poland

Varkaus

- Lu'an, China
- Nakskov (Lolland), Denmark
- Petrozavodsk, Russia
- Pirna, Germany
- Rjukan, Norway
- Rüsselsheim am Main, Germany
- Sandviken, Sweden
- Zalaegerszeg, Hungary

Vesilahti

- Rõuge, Estonia
- Sankt Georgen im Schwarzwald, Germany

Vihti

- Norrtälje, Sweden
- Otepää, Estonia
- Sel, Norway
- Slagelse, Denmark

Vörå

- Ånge, Sweden
- Gausdal, Norway
- Malvik, Norway
- Torma (Jõgeva), Estonia
- Vejen, Denmark

== Y ==
Ylivieska

- Voss, Norway

Ylöjärvi

- Arvika, Sweden
- Balatonföldvár, Hungary
- Kareda (Järva), Estonia
- Kongsvinger, Norway
- Saare (Jõgeva), Estonia
- Saku, Estonia
- Skive, Denmark

Ypäjä

- Bábolna, Hungary
