= Alfred Shaheen =

American businessman (1922–2008)

- Alfred Shaheen, c. 1957, wearing Samoan tapa
- Born: Alfred Shaheen; January 31, 1922; Cranford, New Jersey
- Died: December 22, 2008 (aged 86); Torrance, California
- Resting place: Oahu Cemetery, Honolulu, Hawaii
- Education: Whittier College
- Occupation: Textile industrialist
- Awards: Ka'Ahu No'eau Governor's Lifetime Achievement Award, State of Hawaii, 2001; Hawaii's 150 Most Important Influences Since 1856, The Honolulu Advertiser, July 2, 2006
- Military career
- Allegiance: United States of America
- Branch: Army Air Corps
- Service years: 1943–1945
- Rank: First lieutenant
- Units: Fighter pilot in the 9th and 12th Air Corps
- Website: www.alfredshaheen.com

Alfred Shaheen (January 31, 1922 – December 22, 2008) was a textile industrialist who is credited with popularizing the aloha shirt.

"He was a true visionary", said Linda Arthur, a professor and curator for the Washington State University Department of Apparel, Merchandising, Design and Textiles. "He started in a place (Hawaii) where there was no industry to speak of and created one from the ground up, creating a truly vertically integrated business."

Elvis Presley wears the Tiare Tapa, an Alfred Shaheen shirt, on the album cover for his album Blue Hawaii.

== Early life ==
Shaheen was born in Cranford, New Jersey, on January 31, 1922, to a family of Lebanese immigrants, who were garment industry entrepreneurs. Shaheen's grandfather, Assi Shaheen, came to the U.S. from Lebanon in the late-1800s and established silk factories in New York and New Jersey. Shaheen's father, George, joined his father, Assi, in the U.S. in the early-1900s. George ultimately started his own business, Geo. Shaheen, with his wife, Mary. In 1938, George moved his family and his business to Hawaii, where George and Mary specialized in custom garments made from silks, brocades, rayon satin, and other formal fabrics. Alfred returned to the mainland to attend Whittier College, where he excelled at math, physics, engineering and football. After graduating with a degree in aeronautical engineering just as the U.S. entered World War II, he enlisted in the Army Air Corps and became a fighter pilot, flying 84 missions over Germany, Italy and France.

== Surf 'n Sand Hand Prints ==
In 1945, when Shaheen returned to Hawaii from the war, he joined his parents in their custom garment business. In 1948, Shaheen founded his own garment company. In the late 1940s, a dock strike and the Korean War severely curtailed importation of goods to Hawaii, so Shaheen made his own equipment from parts he found in Honolulu's junkyards to dye and finish fabrics under the brand name Surf 'n Sand Hand Prints.

Shaheen distributed his clothing all over the world. He believed in celebrating cultural diversity, and his artists adapted designs from authentic sources such as rare books and ancient artifacts. Shaheen and his staff visited Tahiti, Samoa, Hong Kong and Tokyo to study the designs of the Eastern Pacific Rim. Shaheen adapted these designs to textiles and produced the Pua Lani Pareau, Antique Tapa, and Joss Sticks handprints. Shaheen established "East Meets West" boutiques in the mid-1960s in major department stores across the country.

Shaheen's designs were featured in the pages of fashion magazines such as Vogue, Mademoiselle, and Harper's Bazaar. His clothes and fabrics were sold all over the world, including Bergdorf Goodman, Bloomingdale's, Macy's and Bullock's.

In the 1960s, the company diversified, adding footwear, drapery, jewelry, fragrance, and pattern kits complete with fabric and coconut buttons.

== Innovations ==
- Metallic dyes: Together with Dr. Edmund Lutz, his friend and head dye chemist, Shaheen created over 100 metallic colors, including gold, silver, sapphire, ruby, and emerald. These metallic dyes are lightfast, chlorine- and saltwater-resistant, and can withstand the rigors of the tropics. Sometimes the metallics would outline a print, and other times the metallics were used for the print itself.
- Engineered print
- Pop-up shop, store-within-a-store boutique

== Labels ==
Shaheen's fabrics have been used by various labels, including Reyn Spooner, Andrades, McInerny, Liberty House, Waltah Clarke, Speedo, and Stetson. Shaheen's name and label are typically found on the selvedge of these fabrics. Shaheen has also licensed prints for manufacture in European countries. In 2021 Wall coverings were added to the collections under the Brenda Houston label Wallcovetings

== Retirement and death ==
Shaheen retired in 1988 and died on December 22, 2008, due to complications from type 2 diabetes.

== Museum exhibits ==
- Bishop Museum, November 10, 2012 – February 28, 2013
- Maui Arts & Cultural Center, September 4, 2011 – October 29, 2011
- Washington State University, April 7, 2011 – May 3, 2011
- Arab American National Museum, October 7, 2010 – March 13, 2011
- San Jose Museum of Quilts & Textiles, May 18, 2010 – August 8, 2010
