= Kāhala, Hawaii =

Neighborhood of Honolulu, Hawaii, United States

Coordinates: 21°15.981′N 157°47.029′W

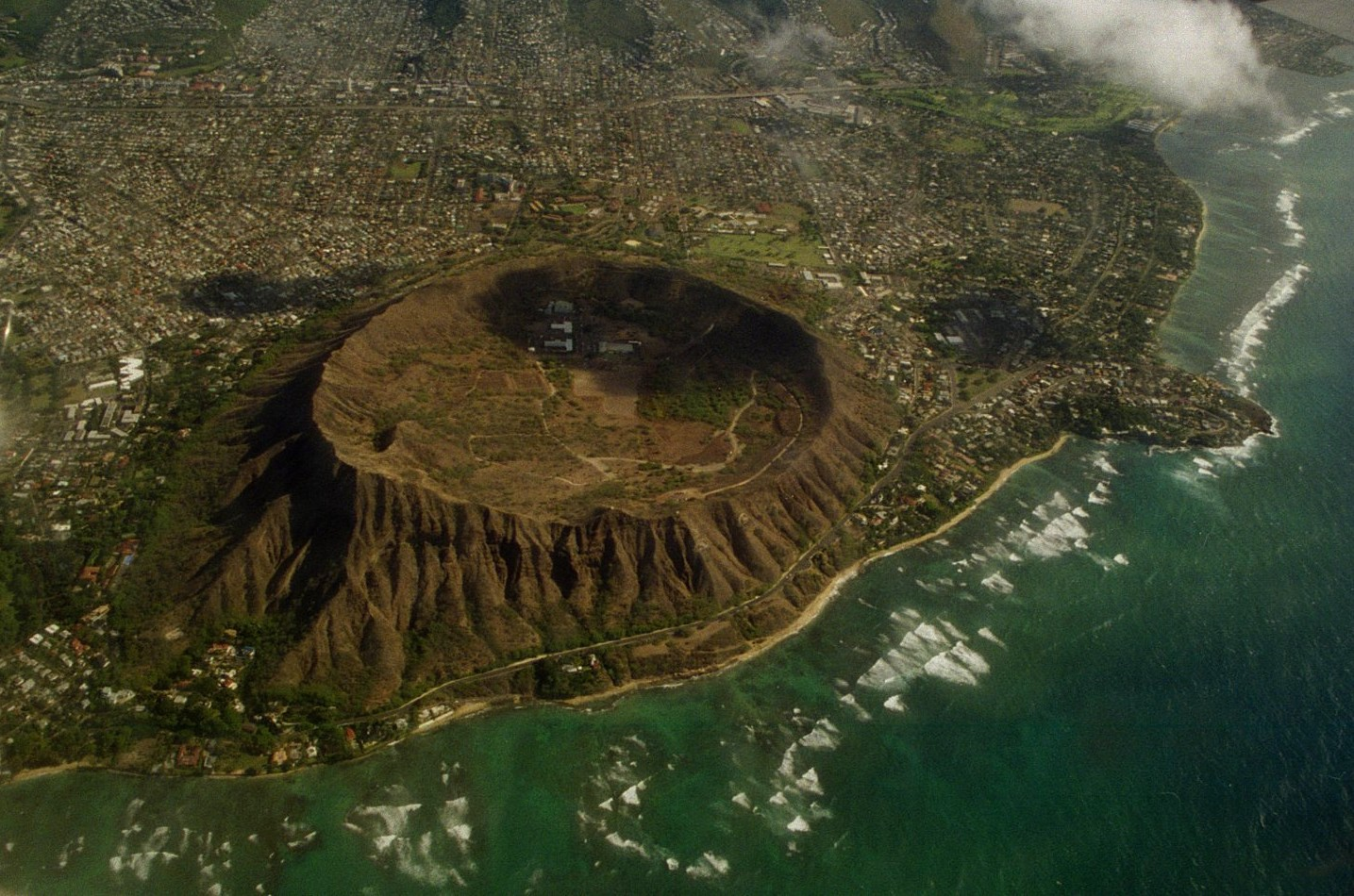
Aerial view of Diamond Head with Kahala to the upper right

Kāhala, is a neighborhood in Honolulu, Hawaii. Kahala contains a large concentration of luxury real estate and beachfront properties. It consists of approximately 1,200 homes.

Kahala is also home to the Kahala Hotel & Resort, formerly known as the Kahala Mandarin Oriental, and prior to the Kahala Hilton. Also located along the borders are Kahala Mall, and Diamond Head crater. It is the namesake of Kahala aloha shirts.

Kahala is a flat area of Honolulu, within a 5 – 15 minutes drive of Waikiki and downtown.

== History ==
In 1795, King Kamehameha’s canoes started landing in Kahala in his effort to unite the islands. After he conquered Oahu, many Native Hawaiians started settling on the island.

In the 1800s, Kahala became the primary location for cattle and pig farms on Oahu because it was one of the few completely flat areas on the island.

During World War I, forests in Kahala were cleared. After the war concluded, the upper class started to discover Kahala and wanted to gentrify the area. Farms were shut down, and ponds were filled in to make way for the new mansions that started being built. After World War II, Kahala was subdivided and became Waialae-Kahala.

Farmers road was home to Taylor’s Chicken Farm. It was considered a gathering place for local Kahala residents. There was a pavilion at the end of the road where dances, parties, and hula classes were held. On Farmers road, there were lots of stables and pig farms. Doris Duke started a hydroponic garden on it where they raised fruit and vegetables. In the past, vendors used to come to each neighborhood with trucks that could display their wings. They mainly sold vegetables but also brought fish and eggs. Times were different back then because leaving your door unlocked for the milk and meat man was expected. Furthermore, any kitchen scraps were left outside for the pig farmers to feed their livestock. There used to be more greenery in the neighborhood because there were lots of coconut trees, and there used to be a grove of mango trees where Kahala School is now.

In 1964, Kahala Hilton Hotel was built even though there was much opposition from the local residents.

By 1986, homeowners in Kahala were finally able to buy their land from the Bishop Estate, and no longer had to lease their property.

In the 1980s, Japanese businessman Genshiro Kawamoto bought 31 lots in Kahala. Instead of living in them, he demolished them, let them sit vacant, and turned some properties into the Kahala Avenue Mission. His presence in Kahala created lots of problems within the community, but in 2013, he sold all his Kahala properties to a local real estate and investment company.

== Government ==
- City Council District IV, Tommy Waters
- Hawaii State House of Representatives, District 18, Mark Hashem
- Hawaii State House of Representatives, District 19, Bertrand Kobayashi
- Hawaii State Senate, District 9, Stanley Chang

== Education ==
Hawaii Department of Education operates Kahala's public schools. Kahala Elementary School is located in the neighborhood. Kalani High School serves high school students in Kahala Star of the Sea is a Catholic K-8 private school.
