= Genshiro Kawamoto =

Japanese businessman (1932–2024)

Genshiro Kawamoto (川本 源司郎, Kawamoto Genshiro; 1 March 1932 – 12 February 2024) was a Japanese businessman known for his real estate investments in Japan, California and Hawaii. He is also notable for controversial real estate investments in the late 1980s, when he bought more than 170 properties, including many Oʻahu homes.

More recently, Kawamoto is known for owning 30 properties in the Kāhala area of Honolulu where he has allowed them to be run down, attracting many complaints and media attention. Although these homes are vacant, boarded up and often vandalized, their estimated total value is $200 million. In September 2013, Kawamoto sold all of his Hawaii assets to Alexander and Baldwin for $128 million. The transaction was brokered by Steve Sombrero, president of NAI ChaneyBrooks.

Born into a wealthy kimono shop owner's family in what is now Kitakyushu, Fukuoka Prefecture, he went to Keio University, but did not graduate.

Kawamoto died on 12 February 2024, at the age of 91.

== Kāhala Avenue Mission ==
In 2006, Kawamoto announced that he would rent out some of the 18 homes he owns on Kahala Avenue, most purchased for between $2 million and $20 million, to native Hawaiian families for $150 – $200 per month.

== Controversy ==
Kawamoto owns dozens of office buildings in Tokyo under the name Marugen and has been buying and selling real estate in Hawaiʻi and California since the 1980s, and had been accused of making money by driving real estate values down by various methods such as erecting statues, destroying fences and removing landscaping and buying them out and then selling them when the price increased.

He has been criticized for evicting tenants of his rental homes on short notice so he could sell the properties, as in 2002 when he gave hundreds of California tenants 60 days to leave.

Two years later, he served eviction notices to tenants in 27 Oʻahu rental homes, mostly in pricey Hawaiʻi Kai, saying they had to leave within a month. He said he wanted to sell the houses to take advantage of rising prices.

Some neighbors were unhappy with Kawamoto's plans, speculating that he was trying to drive down real estate values so he can snap up even more homes.

"Everyone's paying homage to him, but in reality, he's the problem," said Mark Blackburn, who lives down the street from Kahale's new home when interviewed by CNN in March 2007. "Houses are homes. They're made to live in; they aren't investment vehicles." In response, Kawamoto has responded by saying that the neighbors should leave if they don't want to live next to Hawaiians.
