= Kahala, Harju County =

Village in Estonia

Coordinates: 59°27′58″N 25°30′26″E

Kahala, Estonia
- Village
- Interactive map of Kahala, Estonia
- Country: Estonia
- County: Harju County
- Parish: Kuusalu Parish
- Time zone: UTC+2 (EET)
  - Summer (DST): UTC+3 (EEST)

Kahala is a village in Kuusalu Parish, Harju County in northern Estonia The village covers an area of 18.3 km². In 2020, the village had fewer than 100 residents. The village leader is Janno Laende.

The southern part of the village is crossed by the Tallinn–Narva highway (also known as the Peterburi road), which crosses the roads leading to Kursi and Hirvli via a viaduct, including a traffic junction. Bus services operate along both the old Narva road and the Tallinn–Narva highway (Peterburi road).

A significant portion of the village's farms is located south of Lake Kahala along the old Tallinn–Narva highway (Tallinn–Peterburi postal road) (officially known as the Jõelähtme–Kemba road).

Another group of farms is situated south of Kahala-Liiva along the road leading to Kursi and Hirvli, and northwards along the road leading to Loo Manor (Andineeme). This part of Kahala is also known as Kahala-Liiva, which probably derives its name from the nearby gravel and sand quarry. At this crossroads stood the Kahala-Liiva tavern, which was completely destroyed during World War II and is now gone. Nearby, famous in all over the country autumn fairs were held, and efforts have been made to continue this tradition since 2020.".

== History ==
The way the name is written has changed after its first known mention in the Danish assessment book. The meaning of the name can be interpreted in multiple ways.

In the village, there was Kahala post station, built at the end of the 18th century, on the Tallinn–Peterburi postal road.

Jakob Kalle, a prominent figure in politics, agriculture, and banking during the first republic, as well as the mayor of Kolga municipality, hailed from Kaarnavälja farm in Kahala. In March 1941, he and his entire family were deported, and the Soviet regime destroyed his family of four. A memorial stone now stands at the location of Kaarnavälja farm.

In Kahala-Liiva, near the road leading to Kursi, there was a watermill dating back to the 19th century, which belonged to Kolga Manor. In 1962, it was transported to the Estonian Open Air Museum as an exhibit.

To bring together people interested in the fate and historical heritage of Kahala Lake and its surroundings, Kahala Lake Villages Association was established in 2005.

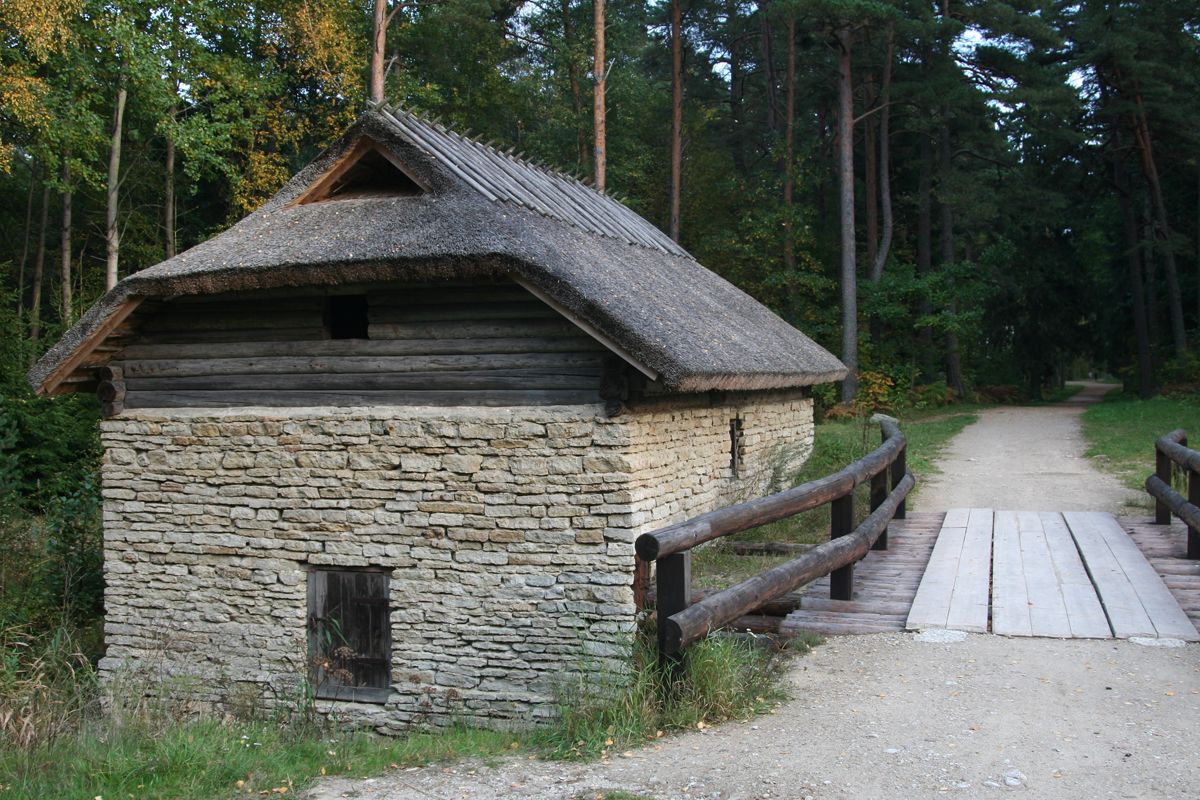
Kahala watermill on its new location in Estonian Open Air Museum.

== See also ==
- Lake Kahala
