= Lake Kahala =

Lake in Estonia

- Kahala järv (Estonian)
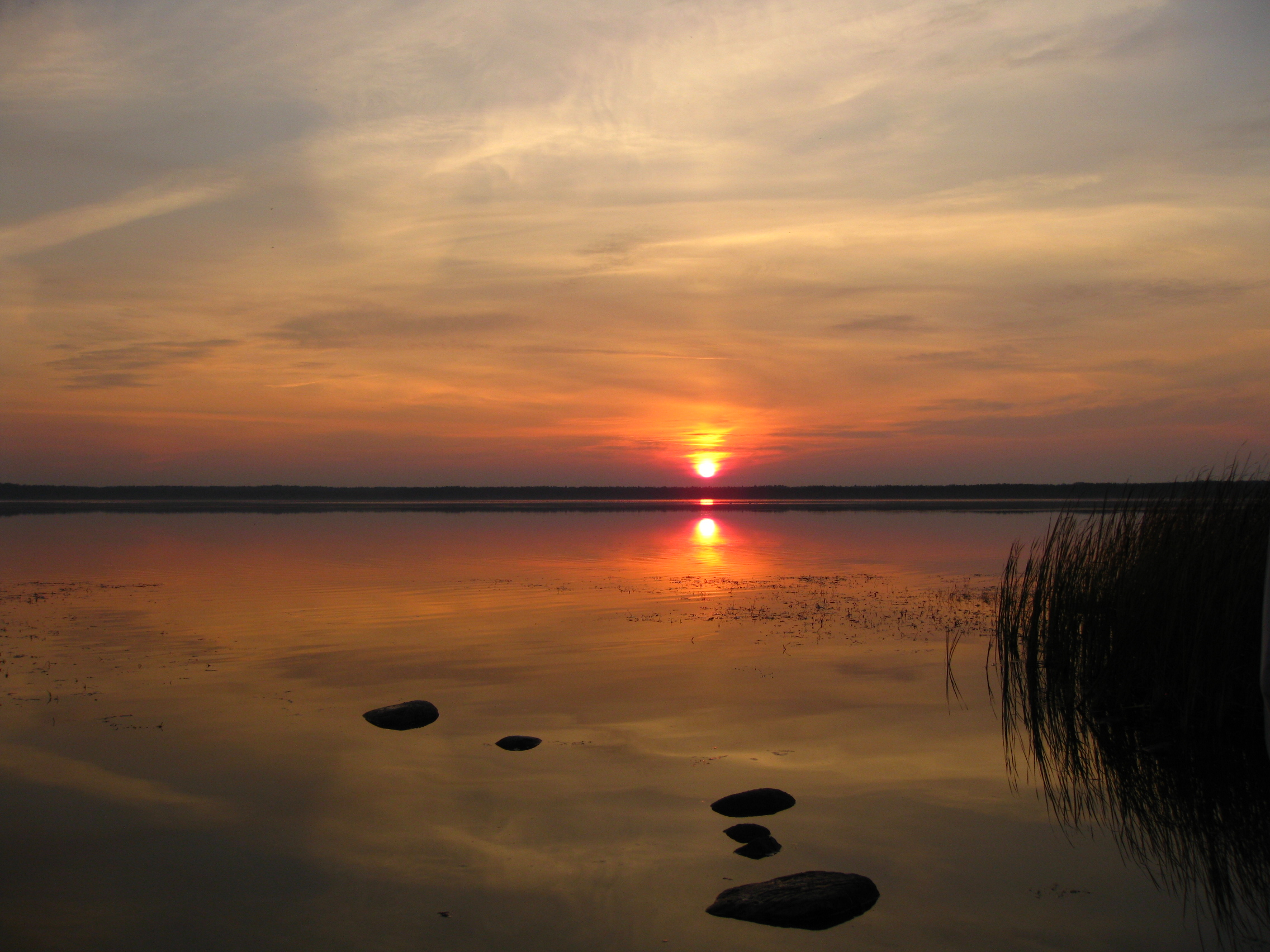
- Lake Kahala at sunrise

- Location within Estonia
- Location: Kuusalu Parish, Harju County
- Coordinates: 59°28′50″N 25°32′10″E
- Basin countries: Estonia
- Max. length: 2,400 meters (7,900 ft)
- Surface area: 344.9 hectares (852 acres)
- Average depth: 1.0 meter (3 ft 3 in)
- Max. depth: 2.8 meters (9 ft 2 in)
- Water volume: 3,421,000 cubic meters (120,800,000 cu ft)
- Shore length^{1}: 7,370 meters (24,180 ft)
- Surface elevation: 33.2 meters (109 ft)
- ^{1} Shore length is not a well-defined measure.

Lake Kahala (Estonian: Kahala järv) is a lake in Estonia. It is located in the village of Kahala in Kuusalu Parish, Harju County.

== Physical description ==
The lake has an area of 344.9 hectares (852 acres). The lake has an average depth of 1.0 meter (3 ft 3 in) and a maximum depth of 2.8 meters (9 ft 2 in). It is 2,400 meters (7,900 ft) long, and its shoreline measures 7,370 meters (24,180 ft). It has a volume of 3,421,000 cubic meters (120,800,000 cu ft).

== See also ==
- List of lakes of Estonia
