= Kahala (apparel) =

Manufacturer of aloha shirts

Kahala is a manufacturer of aloha shirts founded in Honolulu, Hawai’i in 1936 by George Brangier and Nat Norfleet. The company was one of the first manufacturers of aloha shirts and exports their shirts worldwide. It is currently a subsidiary of Tori Richard.

== History ==
Kahala was one of the first manufacturers of aloha shirts in Hawaii, founded by George Brangier and Nat Norfleet, Sr. in 1936. Norfleet, who had worked as a massage therapist at the Los Angeles Athletic Club prior to moving to Hawaii, leveraged his connections to Hollywood to promote his shirts to actors, including John Wayne. The company was quickly successful, exporting shirts to the mainland by 1939 and realizing profits of $1 million by 1959. In 1937, Kahala signed a contract with Duke Kahanamoku to promote their shirts. During World War II, the company nearly went out of business due to being unable to import fabric or export shirts and resorted to producing military uniforms instead.

By 1963, Kahala was a nationwide company and had expanded to womenswear and swimwear in addition to men's shirts. Kahala has undergone multiple changes in ownership in its history, being sold in the 1970s, 1986, and again in 1990. Since 2006, it has been owned by Tori Richard, itself a resort wear manufacturer. Upon acquiring the company, Tori Richard shut down all operations for nine months in order to audit the business' operations. In 2008, Kahala opened a brick-and-mortar store in Honolulu at the Ala Moana Center.

== Design and manufacturing ==
Kahala is known for its reverse-print shirts, which can be turned inside-out to showcase a different pattern. The company's designs primarily come from Hawaiian artists, including John Severson and June Yatsunoff. Kahala has also collaborated with other Hawaiian brands, including Zippy's. Their shirts were originally made from Japanese cloth, but the company switched to Hawaiian-designed fabric in 1937.

Dale Hope, who worked as the company's creative director from 1979 to 2009, stated that their shirts were "woven with the mystery and culture of Hawaii and the stories of those who lived there." Despite this claim, the company has faced criticism for copying Samoan patterns. While the company offshored manufacturing for some years, by 2008 50% of their shirts were made in Kalihi.
