= Tori Richard =

American resort clothing manufacturer

Tori Richard, Ltd.
- Type: Family business
- Industry: Fashion and leisure
- Founded: 1953
- Founder: Mortimer Feldman, Janice Moody and Mitsue Aka
- Headquarters: Honolulu, Hawaii
- Area served: 50 American states, Puerto Rico, Guam, Mexico, the Caribbean, Europe, Asia and Australia
- Key people: Joshua Feldman, CEO
- Products: Aloha shirts, resort wear and accessories for women and men
- Number of employees: 140
- Website: toririchard.com

Tori Richard is a company based in Honolulu, Hawaii, which produces men's and women's resort wear. In its more than 70-year history, the Tori Richard line has gone from exclusively women's fashions (featured in Vogue, Harper’s Bazaar, Mademoiselle, Glamour, Town & Country, Life and other national publications) to a line of upscale resort apparel, including sport shirts, Aloha shirts, tropical dresses, swimwear, separates, handbags, interior accents and a range of fashion and lifestyle accessories. Tori Richard resort wear is aimed at those who enjoy art, travel and a casually upscale lifestyle. The collections are introduced biannually in showrooms on the east and west coasts.

The company's founder, Mort Feldman, an avid collector of Japanese antiques and screens, translated his passion into the East-West fabric prints that remain the Tori Richard signature. CEO Josh Feldman, Mort Feldman's son, leads the locally-owned family business as the company passes its 70th year in business. In two generations, the company has gone from designing primarily women's wear to becoming an international brand.

Through its 13 retail stores (12 in Hawaii and 1 in Arizona), website and 2,500 wholesale accounts, Tori Richard is sold in all 50 states, Mexico, Puerto Rico, Guam, Europe, Asia, Australia and the Caribbean. More than 80 percent of Tori Richard sales are U.S. mainland-driven.

== Prints ==
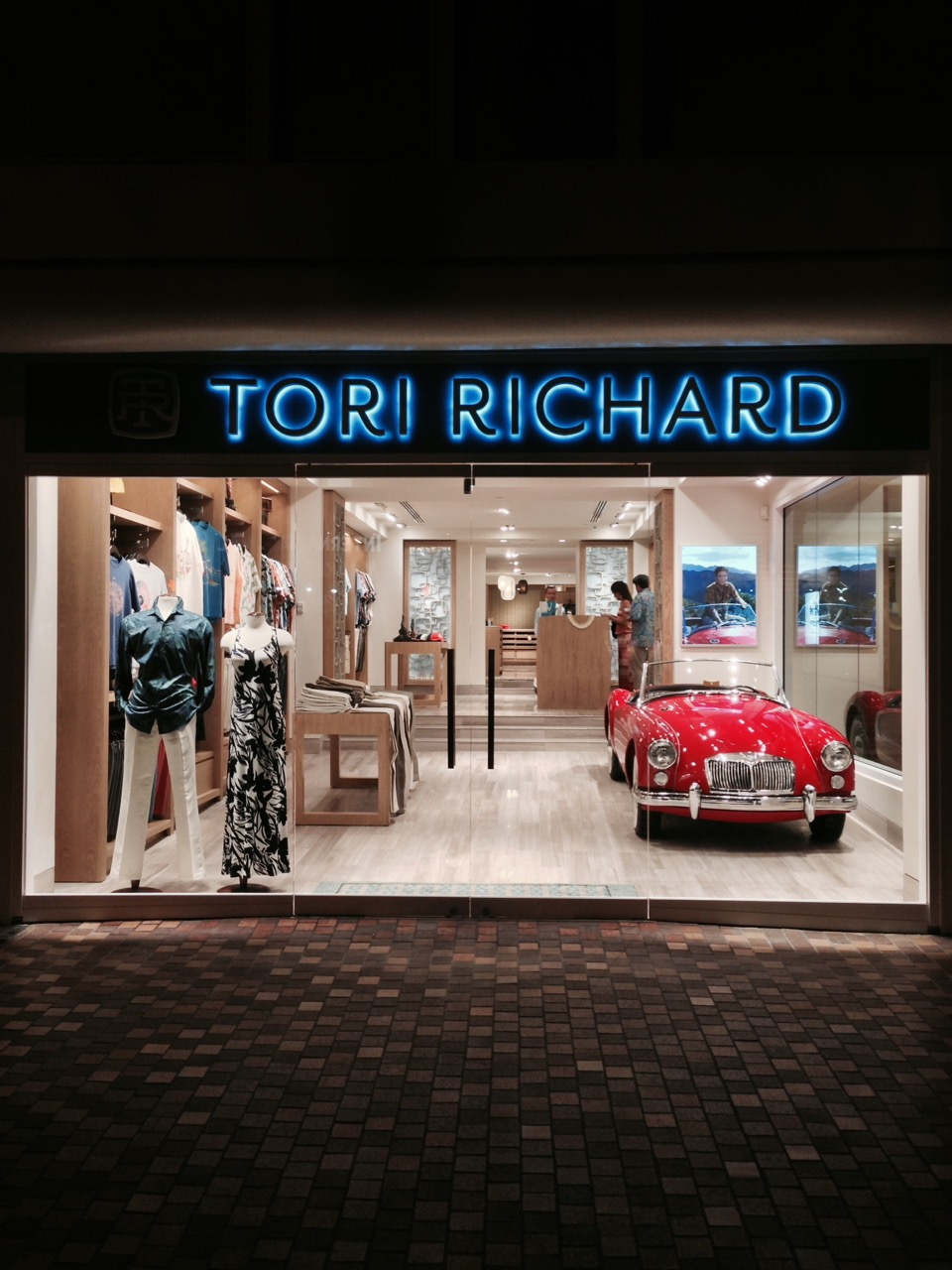
Tori Richard Store in Waikiki

As many as 100 hours may be required to conceive, design and colorize the design and make each new design printable. Tori Richard gathers concept art year-round from company artists, studios, art collections, trade shows, retail outlets and private collections throughout Europe, Asia and the United States An in-house art and design team at the Honolulu headquarters expands on the concepts to create original Tori Richard resort prints. They adhere to specific criteria in design, color and placement, aiming for proportion, visual balance, and originality of the final design. When finalized, each TR print is copyrighted, named, and remains the exclusive property of the company. About 400 new prints are added annually to the TR archive, now numbering at least 25,000 designs.

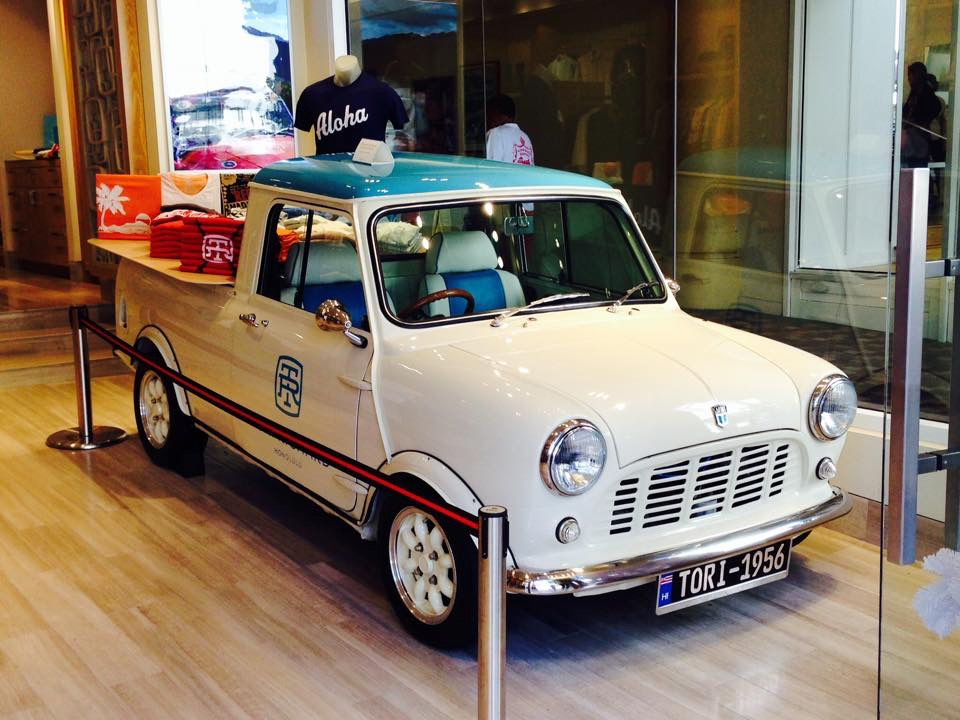
Tori Richard Truck

Vital to each print is the number of color screens required. Printing a design on silk may require up to 22 screens, and for viscose, 17. Patterns are repeated every 24 to 30 inches, while in the larger “engineered” prints, a single image can take up an entire 60-inch panel. Designs range from tightly patterned images to broad, painterly, artistic motifs in both printed and, in the men's Hawaiian shirts, embroidered images. Various visual elements—palette, proportion, mood, message, soft or hard edges—affect the image selection and final print design.

The motifs range from bold geometric prints to botanical, nature-inspired and lifestyle-inspired images. Past designs of Tori Richard's apparel include images of maps, ocean sports, Kiplingesque animals and abstract designs, as well as crisp paisleys and tapa motifs in various fabrications. Variations of popular designs from past collections are sometimes brought back by popular demand. From the beginning, the Japanese aesthetic—stylized waves, water, cranes, fans, chrysanthemum petals, bamboo, textures and brushstrokes—has been prominent in the line.

Tori Richard has recently released its vintage-inspired 56 series, with its own signature themes, fabrications and a more tapered cut. Emblematic of 56 is the cotton, treated for the vintage-washed effect aimed towards the younger demographic. The Tori Richard line also includes seasonal themes in high-end fabrics, with embroidered, engineered designs in heavyweight silks.

Tori Richard pioneered the matched pockets and fronts, now an industry standard. This feature matches the print so there is no interruption in design at the pocket or front seams.

== Fabrics and styles ==
Tori Richard fabrics include silks, silk blends, Pima cotton, cotton blends, linen and linen blends, Tencel©, cotton jacquard and spun viscose, as well as a fine proprietary Egyptian cotton called cotton lawn, giving a finish exclusive to Tori Richard. High-end silks, such as silk jacquard, also appear in single, bold embroidered patterns comprising the more luxurious end of the men's line. Some of the fabrics are made in Japan, unusual among retailers today.

== Details and workmanship ==
The details of a Tori Richard shirt include laser-etched mother-of-pearl buttons, French seams (raw edges turned in, sewn and invisible), matched pockets, and collars with interlining, an extra layer of fabric fused to the inside of the collar to add crispness and prevent droop.

== Women's fashion ==
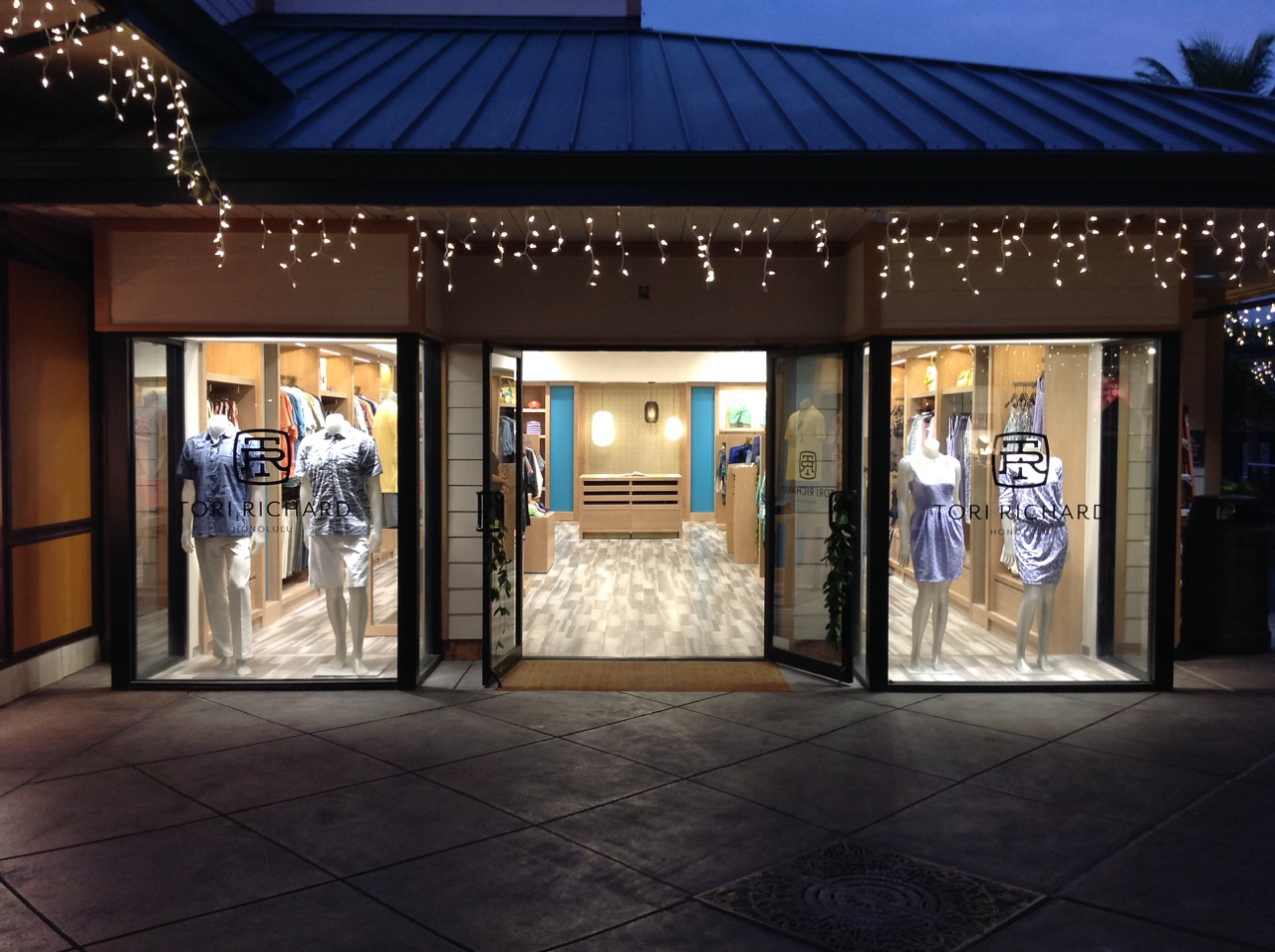
The exterior of the Tori Richard store in the Hilton Hawaiian Village, Waikiki, Honolulu, Hawaii

Tori Richard's women's line includes dresses, capris, tops, tunics, peplum tanks, beach cover-ups, sarong-style and asymmetrical skirts, as well as shorts and modernized caftans in black, exotic prints and casual geometrics. Colors are inspired by the dunes of Marrakech, the deserts of Africa, autumn in the northeast, nature and deep ocean. The women's resort wear goes from day to evening and from beach to dinner, casual to elegant. Styles range from off-shoulder, one-shoulder, strapless and spaghetti-strap dresses to skinny, shirred and dolman-sleeved tops paired with skinny pants in all lengths and contemporary cuts.

Fabrics include cotton, cotton crepe, rayon, jersey knit blends, cotton-spandex piqué, and silk and silk blends, selected for drape, comfort and versatility. Prints for the women's line range from tapa-inspired tribal prints, botanical motifs, abstract geometricals and art-inspired motifs for a global resort market.

Jessica Burgess, formerly of Lilly Pulitzer and Shoshanna, heads up the women's division.

== History ==
While known for its resort wear and aloha shirts, Tori Richard got its beginnings in women's wear. Founder Mort Feldman, an apparel manufacturer from Chicago, flew to the Territory of Hawaii in 1953 on Pan American's China Clipper, intending to retire. He established the company in 1956. With partners Janice Moody, formerly a sportswear designer for Catalina, and Mitsue Aka, Moody's pattern maker, he formed Tori Richard with one sewing machine and practically no capital. They named the company after Victoria (Tori, Moody's daughter) and Richard, Feldman's oldest son.

Their first office, at Pier 7 in Honolulu, was known to have floorboards that became damp from the tide rising in Honolulu Harbor. Among its early offices were a Quonset hut and the historic Primo Brewery, damaged by fire in 1973 and rebuilt to remain the company headquarters for 17 more years.

Soon after its 1956 launch, Tori Richard became nationally known for the unfussy silhouettes, bright colors and dramatic prints of the dresses, culottes, beachwear, caftans and lounge wear of its high-fashion resort women's line, made largely of imported European fabrics at the time. Offices in key mainland markets—New York, California, Florida, Dallas and Chicago—attracted attention from high-end retailers, such as Saks Fifth Avenue, Lord & Taylor, Bergdorf Goodman, Gimbel's, I. Magnin, Neiman Marcus, Nordstrom, Best & Co. and Marshall Field.

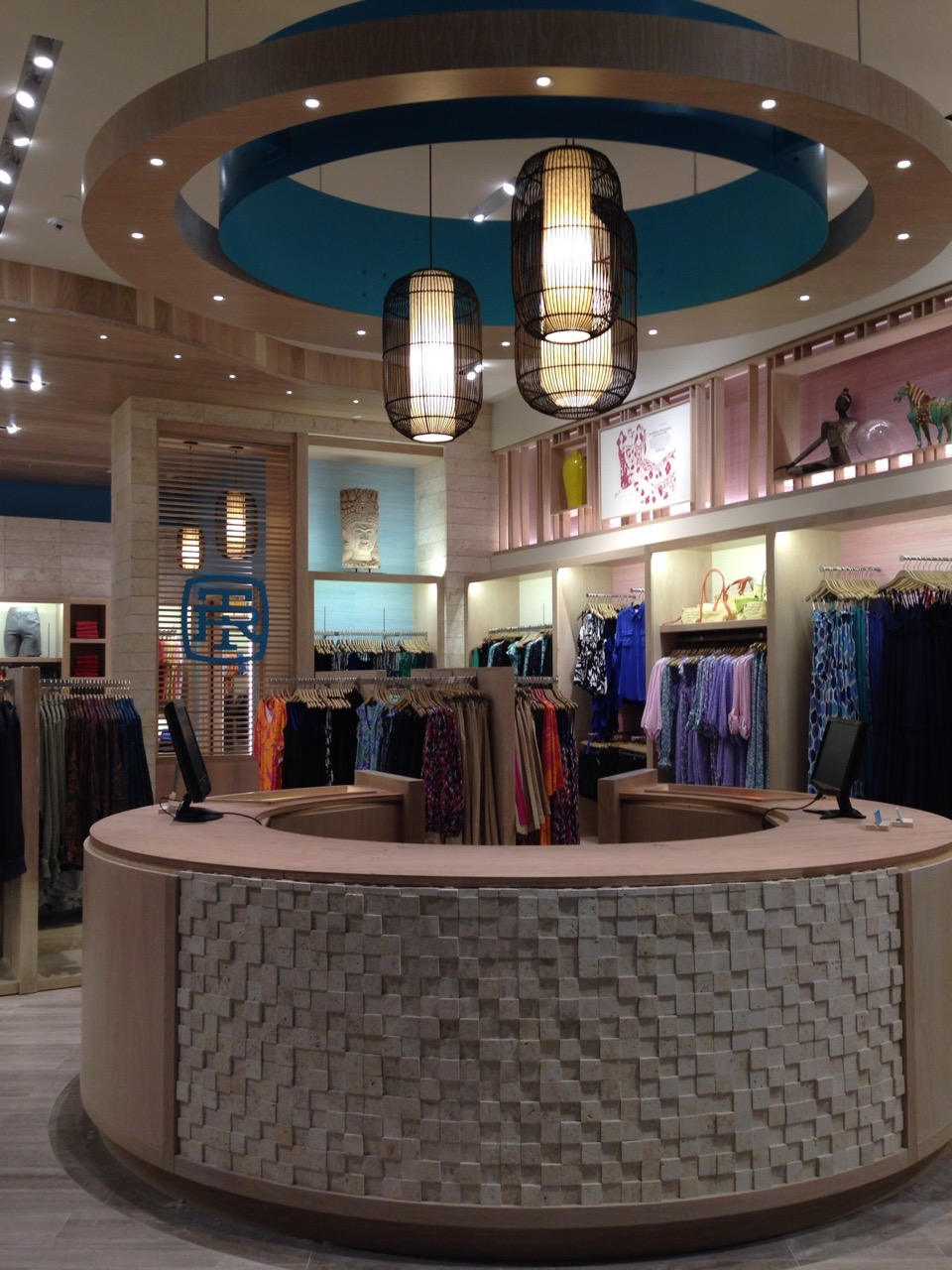
The interior of the Tori Richard store in the Hyatt Regency Waikiki

In the 1960s and ‘70s, Fifth Avenue windows and top national fashion magazines featured Tori Richard in features and ads, many of them photographed on location in Hawaii. As the leisure life was the zeitgeist of the era, the Tori Richard fashions—tunics, harem pants, hostess sets, shifts, caftans, culottes, sarong swimsuits and Capri pants—catered to the cocktail, beach and patio parties that were popular at the time. The esthetics—streamlined and dramatic—departed from the tropical “aloha wear” for which Hawaii was known. Customers ranged from Lucille Ball to the King of Morocco to department store customers across the country.

In 1966, Mort Feldman and a fellow Hawaii fashion executive, Howard Hope, lobbied the Hawaii State Legislature to establish “Aloha Friday” as a state-sanctioned island practice. The effort succeeded, and businesses throughout the state wear aloha attire on Fridays, and, increasingly, on the other days of the week.

The company grew during the boom years of Hawaii tourism. From the early 1960s, soon after statehood in 1959 and the introduction of jet travel to Hawaii, fashion emerged as the third largest export of the state, with Tori Richard as one of the biggest fashion exporters. At the request of a Hawaii retailer named Liberty House, Tori Richard, using prints from its women's line, introduced its men's shirts in 1969. By the mid-1970s, the men's segment of the business was significant, and today the shirts and resort apparel, some of it avidly collected, are carried in all 50 states.

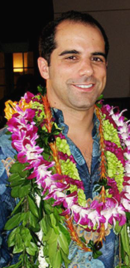
Joshua Feldman, CEO of Tori Richard and son of founder Mortimer Feldman.

Cotton lawn, now a staple of the company with its proprietary finish, debuted in the 1970s and became a mainstay of the men's line.

In the 1980s, menswear eclipsed women's wear in the Tori Richard line. In 1983, Mort Feldman retired to New Zealand, to return to the U. S. three years later. His son, Josh, a graduate of Punahou School and the University of California at San Diego, with a degree in art and a degree in political science, dropped his ambitions for law school and joined Tori Richard in 1994. Under the younger Feldman's leadership, the company grew by over 600 percent.

Upon his return in 1994, Josh Feldman managed the print and product division of the company. He re-introduced the engineered print to the product line in 1995 and redoubled efforts to identify Tori Richard as a print house.

In 2002, the women's line was relaunched, and a year later, the first Tori Richard retail store opened at the Hyatt Regency Waikīkī. Today, there are Tori Richard shops at Ala Moana Center, The Shops at Wailea, Royal Hawaiian Hotel, Hilton Hawaiian Village and Whaler's Village in Ka‘anapali. The year 2006 saw the company's 50th anniversary and was also the year Tori Richard received the “Resort Retailer of the Year” award from Retail Merchants Hawaii. In 2012, the readers of the Honolulu Star-Advertiser voted Tori Richard “Best of the Best” in the aloha shirt category. In November 2025, Tori Richard opened its first mainland store at Scottsdale Fashion Square in Scottsdale, Arizona.

== Appearances ==
The company received film credit for creating George Clooney's shirts in “The Descendants,” the 2012 Academy Award winner for “Best Adapted Screenplay.” Working with costume designer Wendy Chuck, CEO Josh Feldman and his team provided George Clooney's shirts for many of the movie scenes.

Tori Richard also provides shirts for Alex O’Loughlin (Steve McGarrett) and Daniel Dae Kim (Chin Ho Kelly) in “Hawaii Five-0,” as it did for Jack Lord's Steve McGarrett in the original television series from 1968 to 1980.

Musicians such as Sammy Hagar and Jimmy Buffett have worn Tori Richard shirts in their performances, and some artists have worn them on their album covers.

Tori Richard designed the signature shirts for the more than 2,000 volunteers and staff of the Asia-Pacific Economic Cooperation (APEC), spearheaded by President Barack Obama in Honolulu in November 2011. Tori Richard also designed and created an exclusive aloha shirt for Obama and the 21 world leaders in attendance, an effort that required an original design, special limited print run, custom labeling and hand-sewing in Hawaii. (The shirt was given to the delegation, but was never worn at the official gathering.)

== Company environmental conservation efforts ==
In 2008, the company installed a $1.1-million, 154-kilowatt photovoltaic (PV) solar power system at its corporate headquarters and warehouses in Honolulu, becoming one of the world's first solar-powered manufacturers and retailers. The system meets 94 percent of the company's electricity needs in its Honolulu headquarters. In 2011, the company installed an additional 105 kW system on an adjacent property, effectively offsetting 100% of its carbon footprint.
