= The Kahala Hotel & Resort =

Hotel in Honolulu, Hawaii, United States

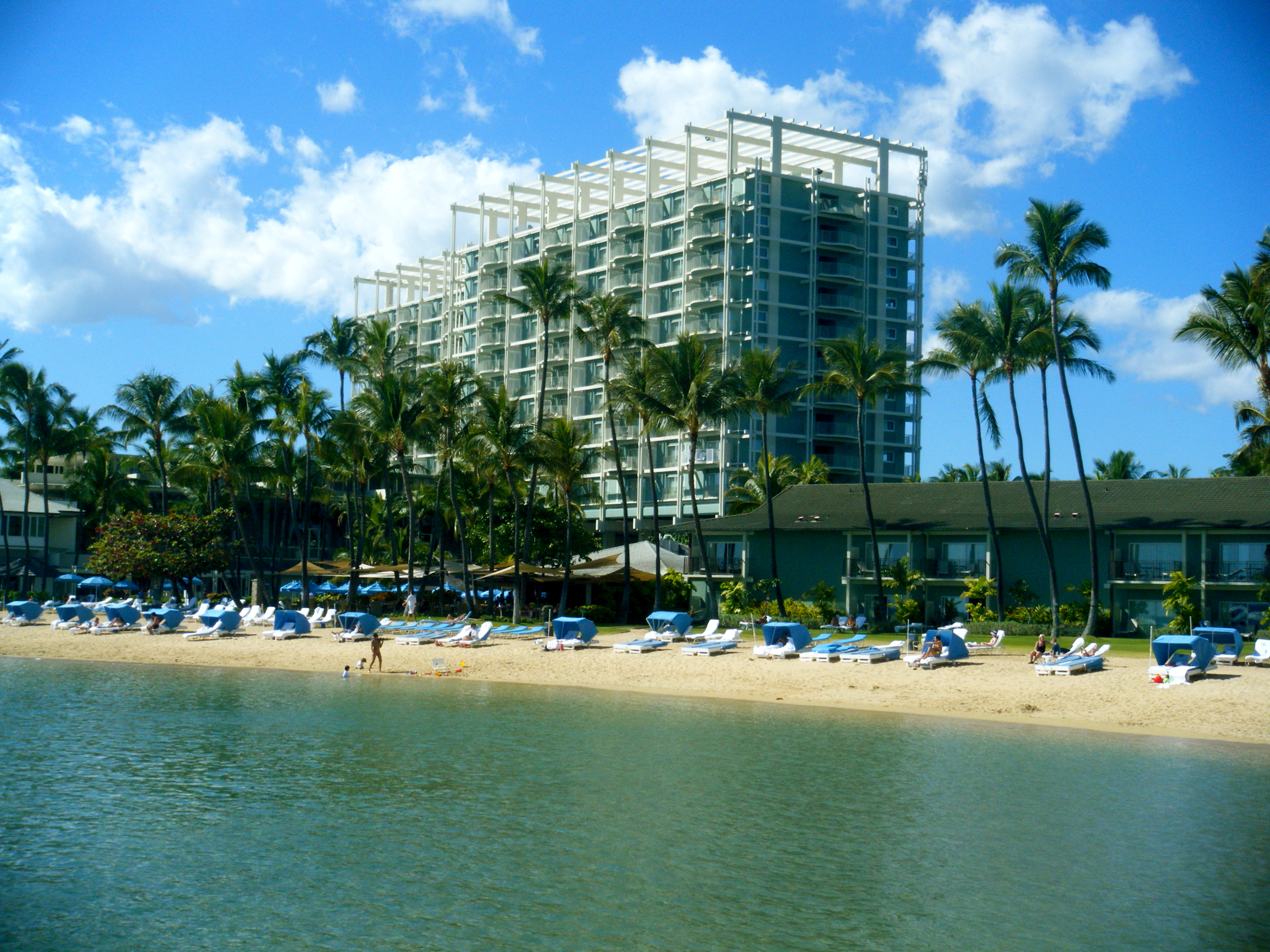
- Interactive map of the The Kahala Hotel & Resort area
- Former names: Kahala Hilton; Kahala Mandarin Oriental; The Kahala

General information
- Location: Honolulu, Hawaii, U.S., 5000 Kahala Avenue
- Coordinates: 21.2719°N 157.7738°W

Website
- www.kahalaresort.com

The Kahala Hotel & Resort is a luxury hotel on the island of Oahu in the state of Hawaii. It first opened in 1964 as the Kahala Hilton. Developed as an exclusive retreat away from Waikiki, the resort became a popular destination for celebrities such as Frank Sinatra and Elton John; foreign dignitaries including Queen Elizabeth II, the Reverend Desmond Tutu, and the Dalai Lama; and eight United States presidents. In the mid-1990s, it was renamed the Kahala Mandarin Oriental and was later known simply as The Kahala. The resort has had captive dolphins or porpoises in its private lagoon since its first year of operation.

== History ==
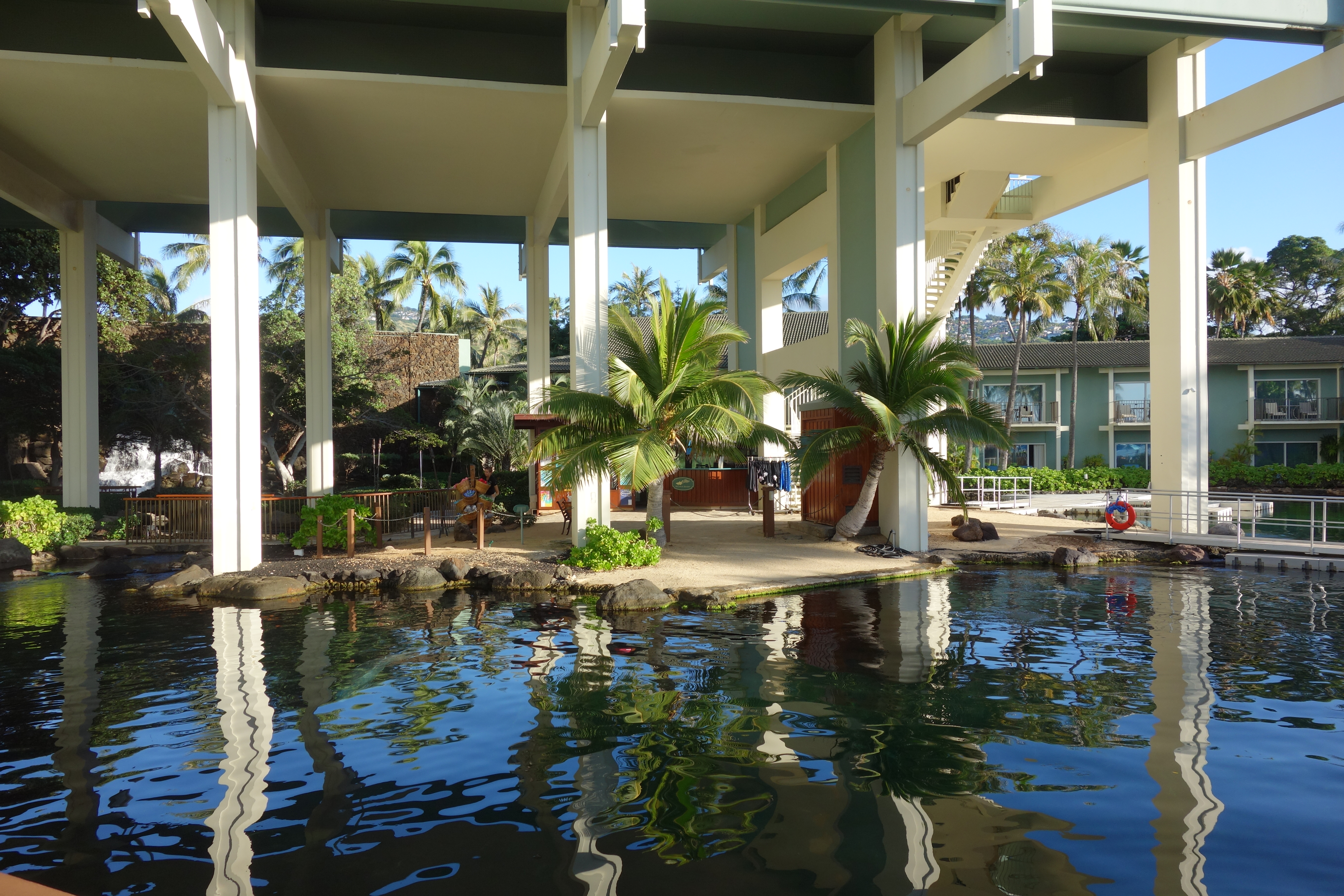
The Dolphin Lagoon at the Kahala Hotel & Resort

Before the hotel was built, the residential neighborhood of Kahala, a 12-minute drive from Waikiki, was still relatively unknown to tourists. In 1959, the land next to the Waialae Country Club was leased from the Bishop Estate by developer Charles J. Pietsch Jr., who partnered with hotelier Conrad Hilton, and commissioned the architectural firm of Killingsworth, Brady and Smith of Long Beach, California. Architect Edward Killingsworth designed the main building as a modernist 10-story structure in the shape of two rectangles. Elevated on two-story-high concrete pillars set in a man-made salt-water lagoon, the building has been called "a work of art distinguished by its overall 'elegant informality'."

When the Kahala Hilton opened in January 1964, it had 302 rooms, including rooms within suites, built at a cost of $12 million. In the early months, the hotel openly provided "comps" (complimentarys, free of charge) to well-known personalities who helped to build its image. A 1964 article in the Honolulu Star-Bulletin noted that famous guests at the Kahala Hilton had included heiress Barbara Hutton; actors Kirk Douglas, James Garner, and Henry Fonda; adventurer Lowell Thomas; ex-Princess Suga of Japan; financier David Rockefeller; actress and singer Rhonda Fleming; and TV comedian Steve Allen.

A major turning point came when NBC booked every room at the Kahala Hilton for its annual meeting of affiliates, and brought in major stars including singer Andy Williams. The Kahala soon became known for its famous guests, including world leaders, Hollywood and TV stars, rock-and-roll artists, and wealthy business executives. Every American president from Lyndon B. Johnson to Barack Obama has been a guest at the hotel.

Starting in 1967, singer Danny Kaleikini was the headline entertainer at the Hala Terrace at the Kahala Hilton, with a popular nightly show featuring Polynesian dancers. Within five years, it became the "best drawing Hawaiian show in the islands", and continued for 28 years.

Initially part of the Hilton Hotels Corporation, the Kahala Hilton was spun off in March 1968, and was taken over by Hilton International. It closed in 1995, and for a period became the Kahala Mandarin Oriental. In 2006, it changed owners again and became known as The Kahala. In 2014, the Kahala Hotel & Resort was sold for nearly $300 million to Resorttrust Hawaii, a Japanese-owned company. Initially, the new owners considered turning the resort into a timeshare. Resorttrust opened a sister property in Japan, Kahala Hotel & Resort Yokohama, in 2020.

== Facilities ==
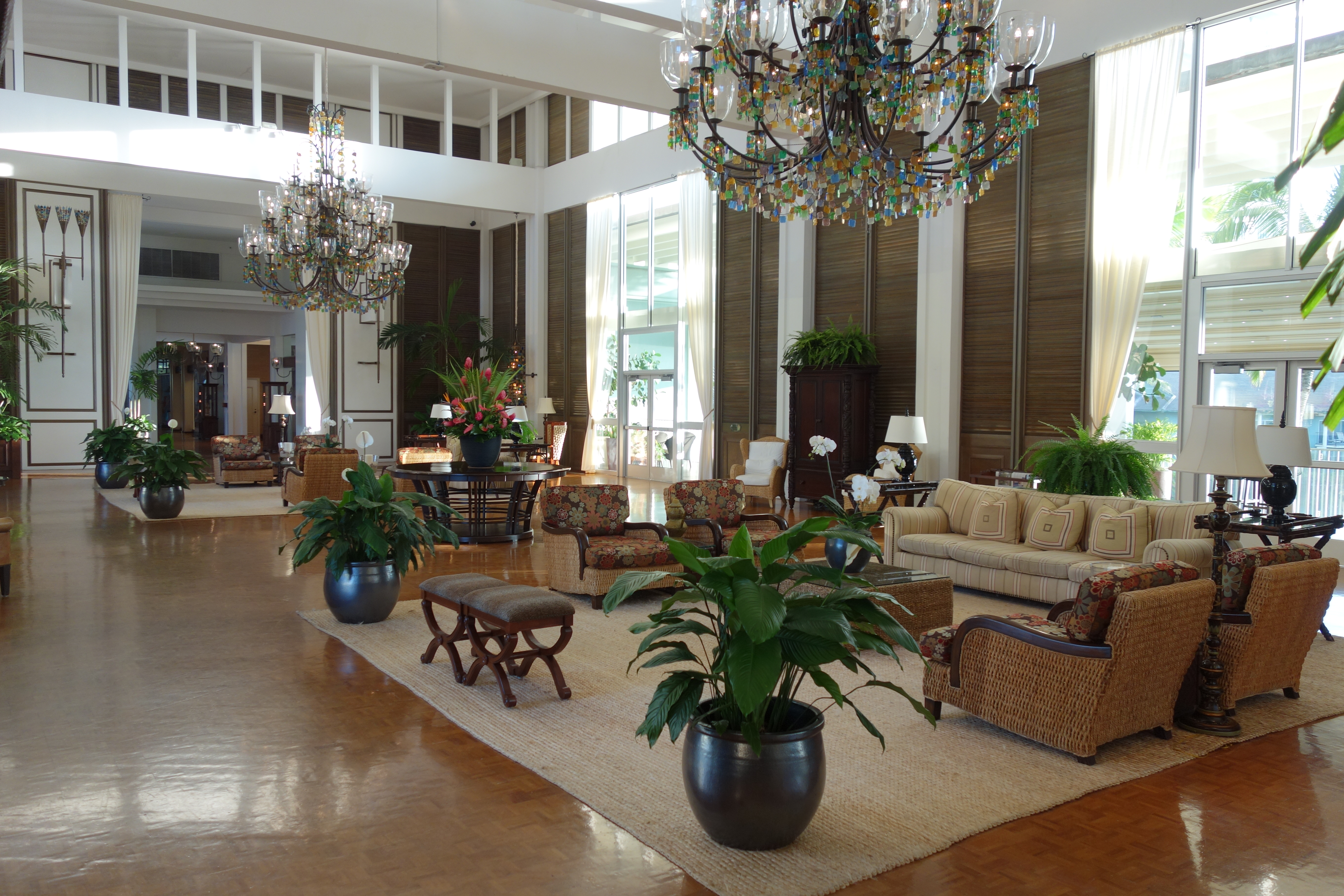
The lobby at the Kahala Hotel, 2016

The 6.5-acre (2.6 ha) property includes 800 feet (240 m) of beach, with sand imported from the island of Molokai. The Kahala Hotel is located on a private road, bordered by the neighboring golf course and the ocean. Guests are greeted with flower leis. The lobby has 30-foot (9.1 m) floor-to-ceiling windows, and two gigantic chandeliers made of multi-colored stained glass. Across from the check-in area is the hotel's often-photographed "Orchid Wall" featuring more than 100 varieties of orchids.

The resort has an onsite spa, a fitness center, an outdoor sauna, and a large lagoon with several Atlantic bottlenose dolphins. Visitors can pay to swim with the dolphins, which are cared for by Dolphin Quest Oahu. The property is also home to sea turtles and stingrays. (Note: Two penguins were kept at the Kahala Hilton between 1984 and 1995. (Ryan 2008))

The hotel has several restaurants, including Hoku's and Arancino, recipients of Ilima Awards in 2021 and 2019 respectively, as well as the Veranda and Plumeria Beach House.

The "Wall of Fame" inside the Kahala Hotel features photographs of famous guests from over the years, including royalty such as Emperor Hirohito of Japan, King Juan Carlos of Spain, and Prince Charles and Princess Diana of the United Kingdom; actors such as Elizabeth Taylor, Lauren Bacall, John Wayne, Sidney Poitier, Bob Hope, and Robin Williams; and musicians including George Harrison, Rod Stewart, and Michael Jackson.

== Dolphins ==
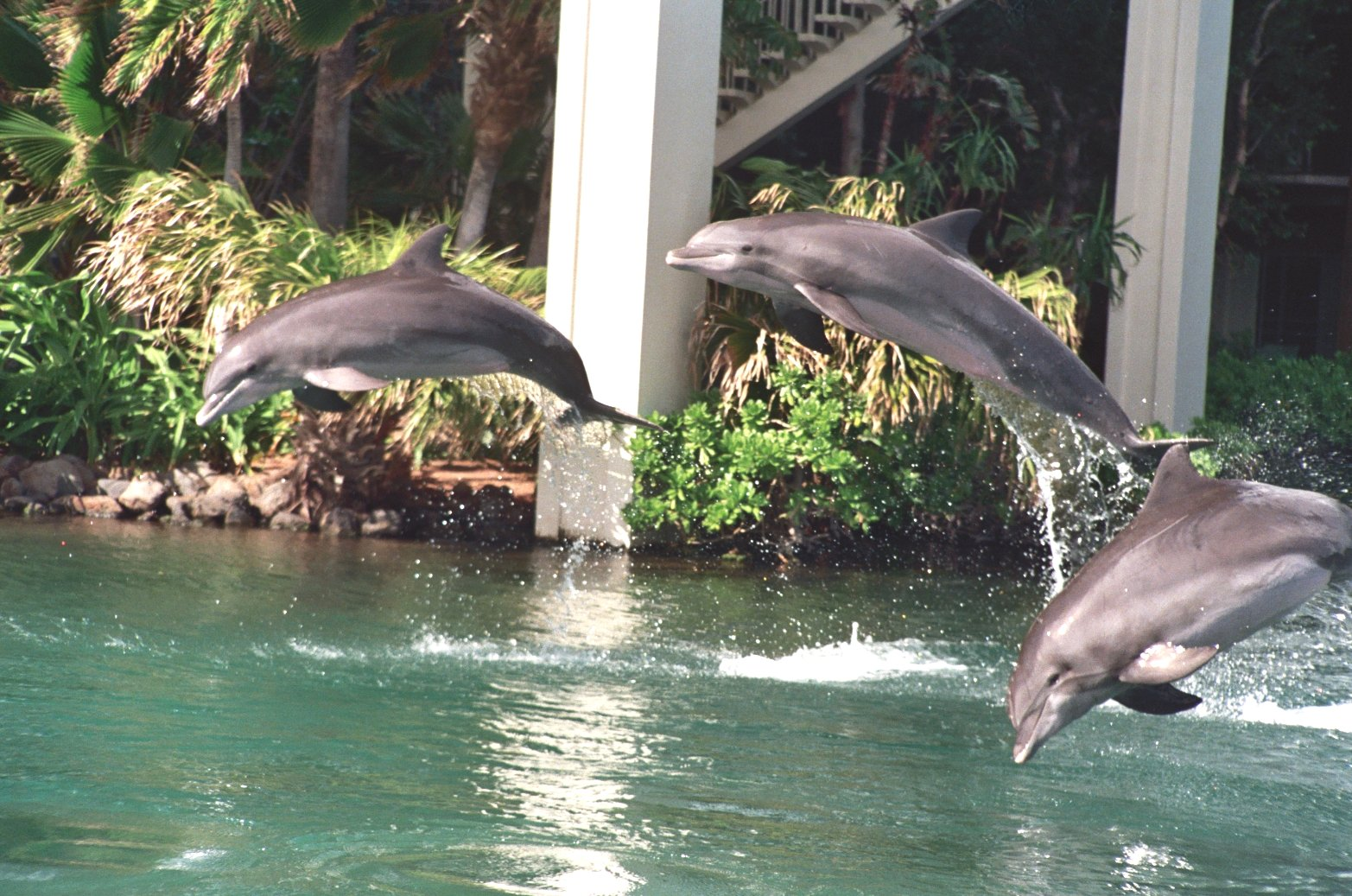
Three dolphins in the Dolphin Lagoon at the Kahala Hilton

In 1964, Sea Life Park asked the Kahala Hilton to temporarily host two porpoises. Hotel executive Charlie Pietsch agreed, and the porpoises became an "instant hit" with hotel guests and local patrons. The Hilton later acquired three dolphins of its own from Gulfport, Mississippi.

In 2017, the Hawaii State Legislature considered resolutions urging Hawaii facilities to stop breeding and keeping dolphins and other cetaceans in captivity; the resolutions stalled. In May of that year, protesters participating in international Empty the Tanks Day called for Dolphin Quest at the Kahala Hotel to release its captive marine animals. Dolphin Quest responded that its zoological facilities at the Kahala and at the Hilton Waikoloa Village supported vital scientific research related to marine life.

== Notes ==
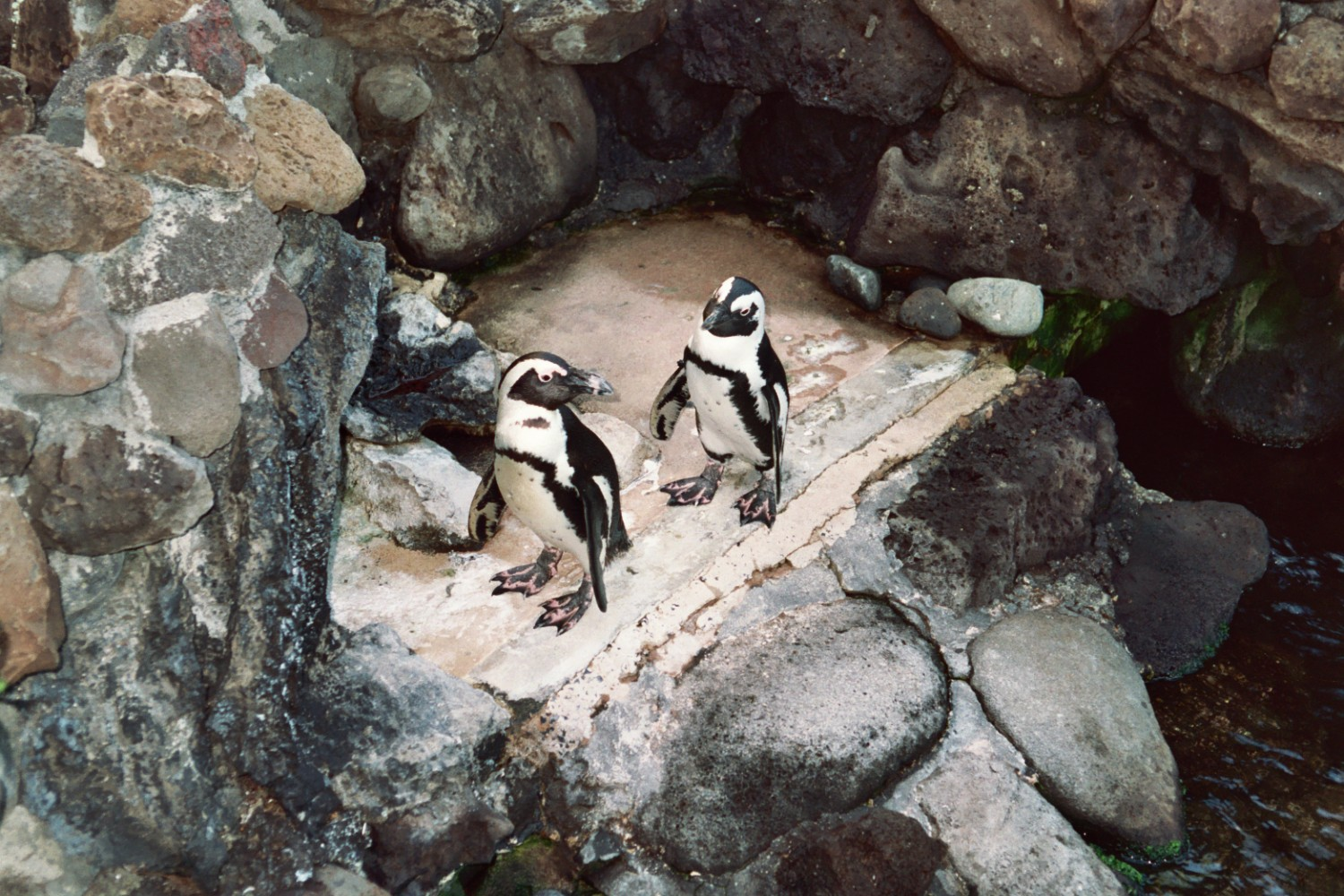
Two penguins at the Kahala Hilton, 1994
