= Reyn Spooner =

American fashion design company

Reyn Spooner is an American fashion design company founded in 1956 by Reyn McCullough and Ruth Spooner. The company, founded on Catalina Island, was originally named Reyns Men's wear.

== History ==
Founder Reynolds McCullough was raised in the 1930s on Catalina Island, California. In the 1940s, after World War II, McCullough returned from Army paratrooper service and took a job with a chain of southern California men's stores. He then bought his employer's shop in Avalon. He started developing six stores on Catalina, among them Reyn's Men's Wear and the Catalina Department store.

McCullough met Don Graham of the Dillingham Corporation, the developers of the Ala Moana Shopping Center in 1957 in Hawaii. In November 1959, McCullough moved to Honolulu and opened a Hawaii retail store within the Ala Moana Shopping Center.

In 1962, McCullough teamed up with Ruth Spooner to create Reyn Spooner in Honolulu.

Spooner Kloth was created in 1964, when Tom Anderson (Reyn's Ala Moana store Assistant Manager) brought McCullough one of Pat Dorian's original "reverse" print shirts.

Reyn Spooner started selling clothing internationally in 1974, when the company started shipping Aloha apparel to Japan, Australia, and Canada.

In 1984, Reyn Spooner collaborated with Vans, in which Reyn Spooner prints were used for Vans footwear. In 1996, Reyn Spooner teamed up with "lifestyle-artist" Eddy Y. to create shirts featuring original Eddy Y. artwork. In 2009, Reyn Spooner collaborated with Urban Outfitters to create a collection of slim-fit shirts. Shortly after, Reyn teamed up with Stüssy to develop an exclusive print for the clothing brand. In 2010, Reyn Spooner debuted its Modern Collection. In 2011, Reyn Spooner collaborated with Opening Ceremony.

Reyn Spooner is now owned by Aloha Brands, led by Charlie Baxter and Dave Abrams.

== Products ==
The Classic collection uses Reyn Spooner's traditional Spooner Kloth, which was first introduced in 1964 and became known as the oxford cloth of the islands. This cloth combines combed cotton with properties of spun polyester. The Classic Collection offers prints from Dietrich Varez, Eddy Y, and Naoki.

Reyn Spooner has the most recent addition being the Modern Collection. This collection was created to appeal to a younger audience.

In recent years, Reyn Spooner has also collaborated with fashion brands such as Urban Outfitters, Stüssy, Transpac and Opening Ceremony. As of 2015, Reyn Spooner operates seven retail stores in Hawaii and sells apparel in specialty and department stores throughout the United States, abroad, and online. Reyn Spooner has been worn by celebrities like George Clooney in the movie The Descendants and Chi McBride in Hawaii Five-0.
