= Kahala, Järva Parish =

Village in Estonia

Coordinates: 58°54′19″N 25°48′59″E

Kahala
- Village
- Interactive map of Kahala
- Country: Estonia
- County: Järva County
- Parish: Järva Parish
- Time zone: UTC+2 (EET)
  - Summer (DST): UTC+3 (EEST)

Kahala is a village in Järva Parish, Järva County in northern-central Estonia.
