= Charvet =

French shirtmaker and bespoke tailor

Coordinates: 48°52′5.42″N 2°19′48.98″E

Charvet Place Vendôme
- Type: Private (SAS)
- Industry: Fashion
- Founded: 1838; 188 years ago
- Founder: Christofle Charvet
- Headquarters: 28 Place Vendôme, Paris, France
- Key people: Anne-Marie Colban (director); Jean-Claude Colban (director)
- Products: Shirts, neckties and suits
- Services: Bespoke and ready-to-wear
- Parent: Chanel
- Website: www.charvet.com

Charvet Place Vendôme (French pronunciation: [ʃaʁvɛ plas vɑ̃dɔm]), commonly known as Charvet, is a French luxury high-end shirt maker and tailor located at 28 Place Vendôme in Paris, France. The company designs, produces and sells bespoke and ready-to-wear shirts, neckties, blouses, pyjamas and suits in its Parisian store, as well as internationally through luxury retailers.

Charvet was founded in 1838. Since the 19th century, it has supplied bespoke shirts and haberdashery to kings, princes, and heads of state. It has acquired an international reputation for the high quality of its products, the level of its service and the wide range of its designs and colors. Thanks to the renown of its ties, charvet has become a generic name for a certain type of silk fabric used for ties.

== History ==
=== Foundation ===
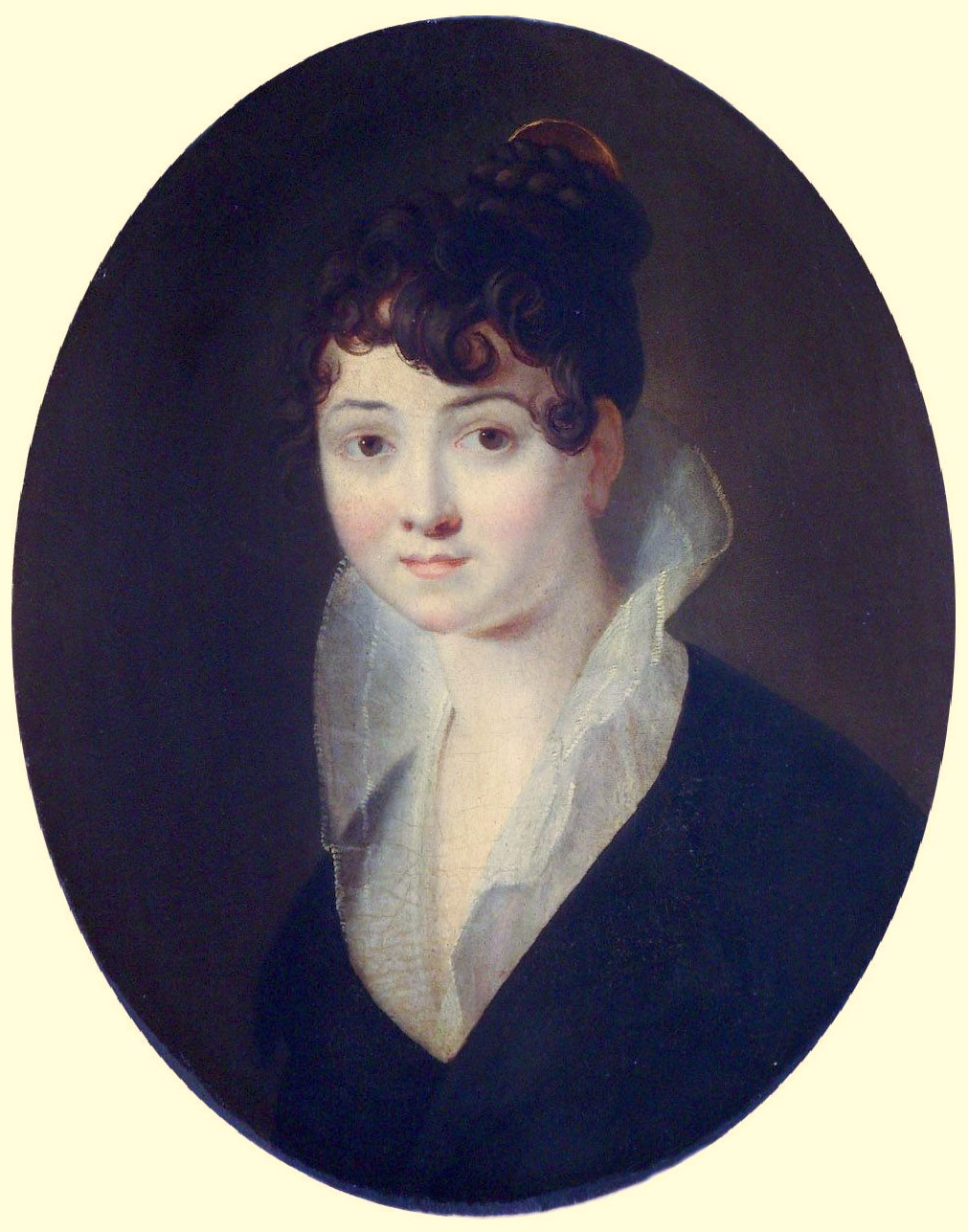
Louise Charvet, Napoleon's linen keeper, around 1813, Malmaison museum.

The store was founded in 1838 (or possibly 1836) (Note: The founding year of Charvet is not a matter of consensus. For a majority of sources, it is 1838. Nevertheless, some other qualified sources refer to 1836.) by Joseph-Christophe Charvet, known as Christofle Charvet (1809–1870).

His father Jean-Pierre, a native of Strasbourg, had been "curator of the wardrobe" for Napoleon Bonaparte, a position created at the beginning of the Empire. The curator assisted the chamberlain or "master of the wardrobe", who supervised all aspects of the emperor's wardrobe – updating the inventories, placing orders, paying bills, and establishing regulations. This position was initially held, between 1804 and 1811 by count Augustin de Rémusat. When it appeared in 1811 Rémusat was mismanaging the wardrobe, an inventory was requested to Jean-Pierre Charvet, and Rémusat was replaced by count Henri de Turenne d'Aynac. Christofle's uncle, Étienne Charvet, was the steward of the château de Malmaison and later of the château de Saint Cloud. Étienne Charvet's daughter Louise Caroline Catherine (1791–1861), Christofle's first cousin, married at the age of 14 Constant, Napoleon's head valet. The marriage was arranged by Napoleon himself, who signed the marriage contract. She became in 1813 a linen keeper at the château de Saint Cloud, therefore responsible for making the imperial shirts. Her portrait (Figure, right) was bequested to the Malmaison museum in 1929 by Édouard Charvet. Constant and his wife Louise did not follow Napoleon in his exile to Elba, an "enormous mistake" according to Christofle's father. Instead, they moved to Elbeuf and invested in a weaving factory, created by Louise's brother Jean-Pierre and specialized in novelty fabrics for trousers and lady coats.

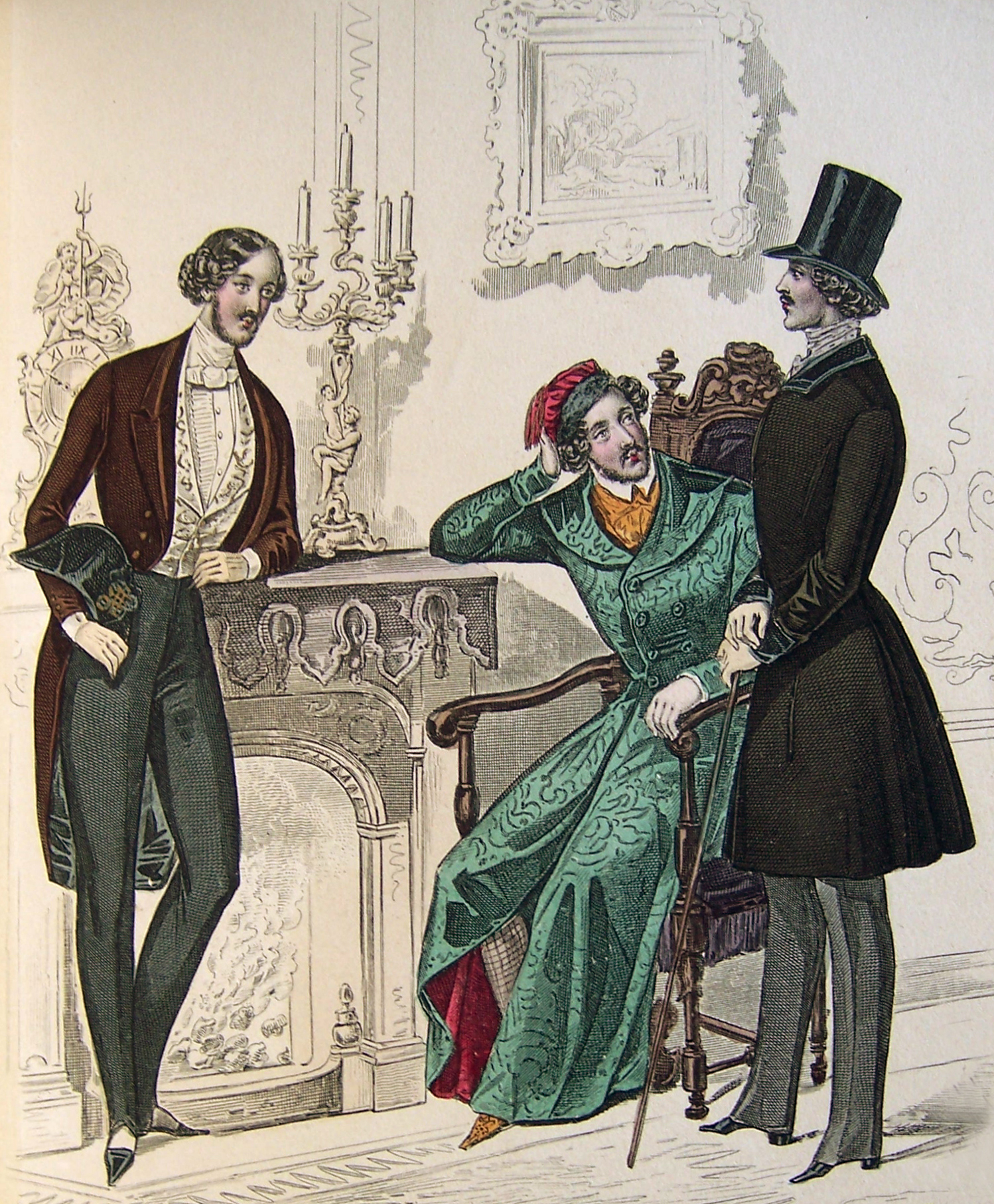
Fashion plate (Le Follet, 1839) showing Charvet shirts, one with a frilled front (left), another with a turned down collar (center).

Christofle Charvet created the first shirtmaker store in Paris, for which the new term chemisier (shirtmaker) was coined. (Note: The word chemisier is considered in 1845 as a neologism.) Previously, shirts were generally made by linen keepers with fabric provided by the customer, but in this store of a new kind, clients were measured, fabric selected and shirts made on site. The development of this specialty trade was favored by a change in men's fashion, with more importance given to the waistcoat and the shirt collar, which called for more propositions for the shirt front and a technical change. Previously, shirts were cut by linen keepers entirely of rectangles and squares. There were no shaping seams and no need for shirt patterns. The new interest for a closer fitting shirt led to curving the armhole and neckline or adding a shoulder yoke, by application to the shirt of tailoring techniques. The new kind of shirt was called chemise à pièce (yoked shirt). Alan Flusser credits Christofle Charvet with the original design of a collar that could be turned down or folded, much in the manner of contemporary collars, and the concept of the detachable collar.

Advertisement (March 1839).

Advertisement (May 1839).

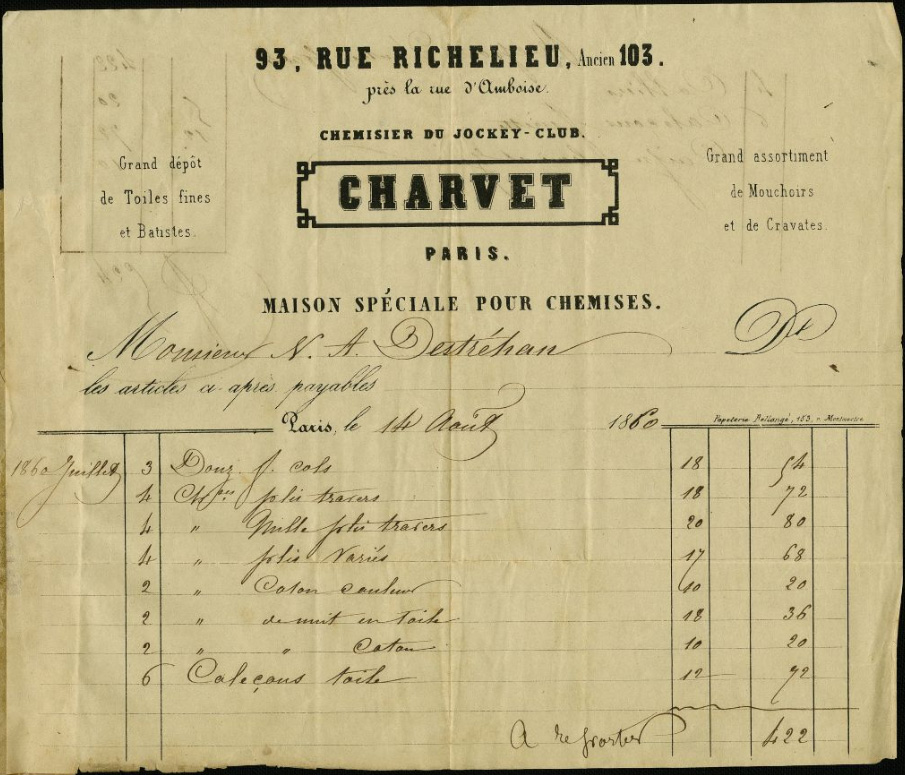
Invoice (1860) to Nicholas Destréhan, a planter from Louisiana.

In 1839, Charvet already had some imitators, (Note: A British newspaper noted in 1840 that "a Shirt-making monomania has lately sprung up in Paris, and whoever will walk down the Rue Richelieu, and the Rue Neuve Vivienne, will see in gigantic letters, 'Les Chemisiers de Paris,' solely 'consecrated' to that very useful article".) but still the "best supply". The same year, Charvet held the title of official shirtmaker to the Jockey Club, a very exclusive Parisian circle, then headed by Prince Napoléon Joseph Ney and inspired by Count Alfred d'Orsay, a famous French dandy. It had about 250 members, mostly aristocrats, who, despite the name of their club, were more interested in elegance than horses. Being a member was a necessary step in order to become a lion, the term used then for a dandy. In an advertisement of March 1839, Charvet, presenting himself as the Club's shirtmaker, claimed to offer "elegance, perfection, moderate prices". Soon after, the claim to moderate prices was dropped (see images, right).

Joseph-Édouard Charvet, known as Édouard Charvet, (1842–1928) succeeded his father Christofle in 1868. He in turn was joined in the early 20th century by his three sons, Étienne, Raymond and Paul.

=== Location ===
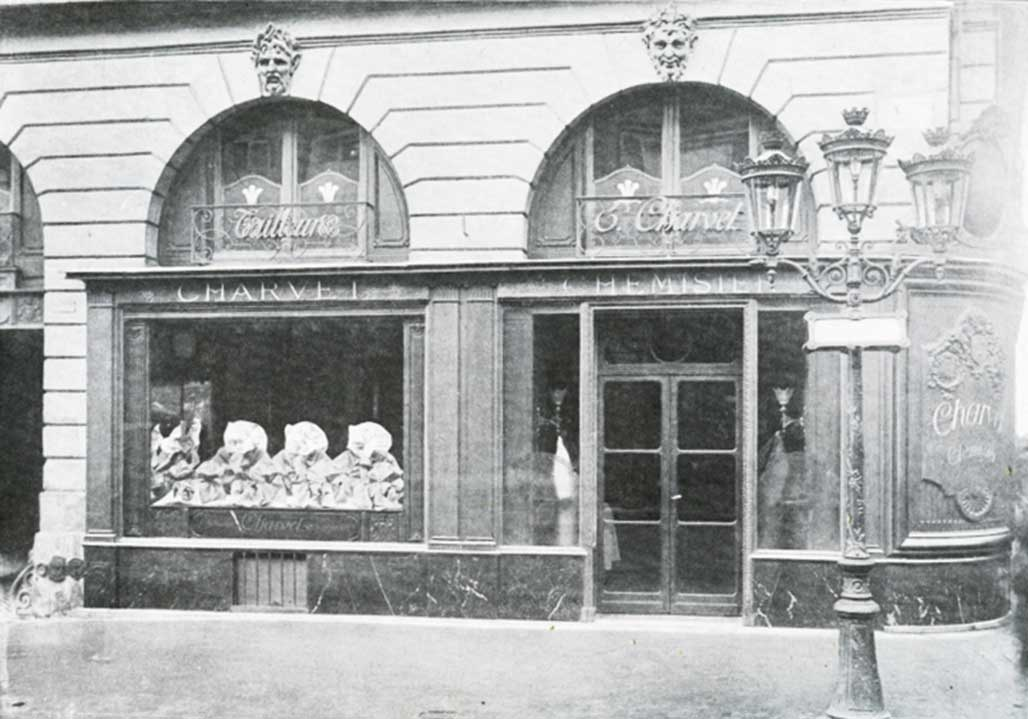
Photo (1909) of the store at 25, place Vendôme

The store was initially located on the rue de Richelieu, at n° 103 and later at n° 93.

It moved to n° 25, place Vendôme in 1877. This move reflected a shift in the center of the Parisian high society and the growing importance for fashion of both rue de la Paix, where the house of Worth had opened in 1858, and the palais Garnier against the Théâtre Italien, closer to Charvet's original location. Though Charvet began to offer women's blouses and men's suits in its new store, men's shirts remained the house's specialty. An American journalist, visiting the store in 1909, reported "there were shirts of every variety and almost every color [,] artistic enough to make one long for them all, and each and every one most beautifully made." The store was noted for its displays, compared in 1906 to Loie Fuller performances, and Charvet paid an "immense salary" to the window decorator, who displayed "each day a new series", producing "veritable works of art in his harmonious combinations of scarves and handkerchiefs and hosiery".

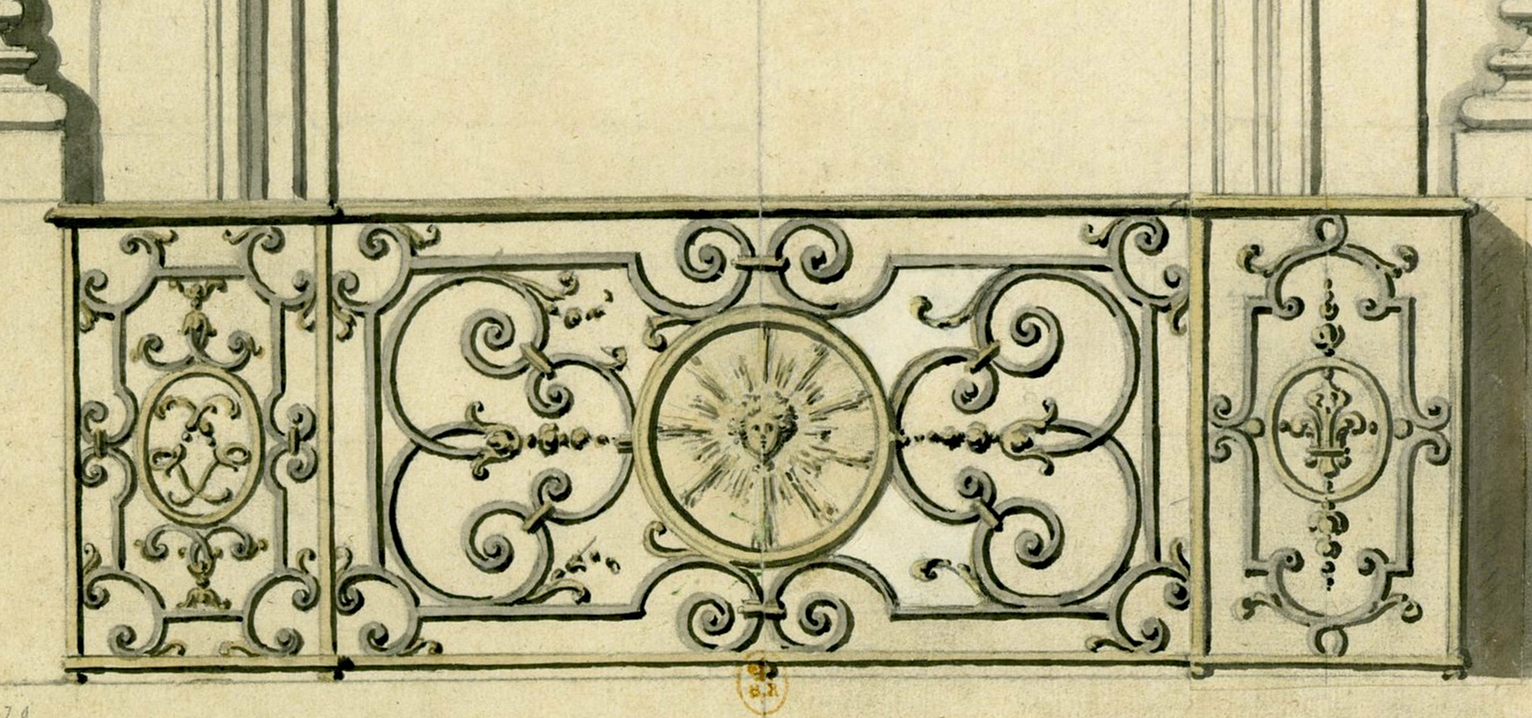
Model handrail designed by Jules Hardouin-Mansart for the balconies of the place Vendôme.

In 1921, the store moved to n° 8, place Vendôme.

In 1982, it moved to its current location, at n° 28.

Charvet remains the oldest shop on place Vendôme, which explains both the inclusion of the location into the firm's name, and the use as a logo of the sun device, designed by Jules Hardouin-Mansart to ornate the handrails of the balconies of the Place, which was built in honor of Louis XIV, the Sun King.

=== International recognition ===
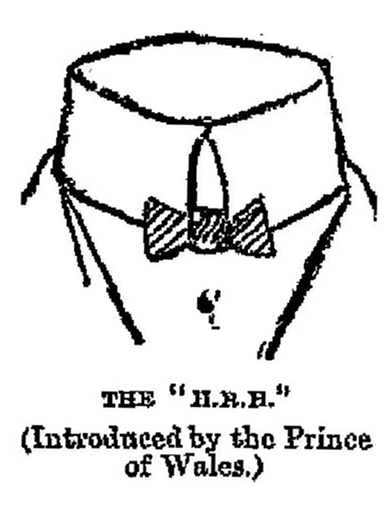
Sketch (1898) of the stand-up turn-down collar designed by Charvet for Edward VII

In 1855 Charvet exhibited shirts and drawers at the Paris World's fair. The jury noted that Parisian shirt makers had an "unquestionable supremacy". (Note: All the other shirtmakers who established the then "unquestionable supremacy" of the Parisian shirt, Longueville, Durousseau, Darnet and Moreau Frères went out of business before the end of the 19th century, leaving only Charvet to keep "the sparkle of its old fame which has never weakened and remains equal to itself".) Again, at the next Paris World's fair, Charvet exhibited shirts, drawers, vests and handkerchieves and the Jury noted luxury shirts were a Parisian "monopoly". When the king-to-be Edward VII visited the fair, he ordered Parisian shirts, as many other foreign visitors did, and remained a loyal customer of Charvet, "honoring him during forty years with a special kindness" (See List of Charvet customers). Charvet created for the prince of Wales a certain style of shirt collar, the stand-up turn-down collar, also referred to as the H.R.H. collar, which became very popular at the end of the 19th century (Figure, right).

In 1863, Charvet was considered the first producer of fine shirts in Paris, claiming superiority "for taste and for elegance" on cuffs, bib and fit. Charvet's store was a "very important" destination for English visitors in Paris. In the following years, Charvet developed its specialization in royal trousseaux. In 1878, he won a silver medal at the World Fair and a gold medal at the 1889 Paris World's fair, for which the Eiffel tower was built. When it won the latter, the jury noted: "Fine shirts remain the property and glory of Paris. To be convinced of it, it is sufficient to give a look to the displays of the companies specialized in royal haberdashery". Other royal patrons confirmed this princely speciality of Charvet, such as Alfonso XII of Spain (1878), Antoine, duke of Montpensier (1879), Philippe, comte de Paris (1893), and sultan Abdul Hamid II (See List of Charvet customers).

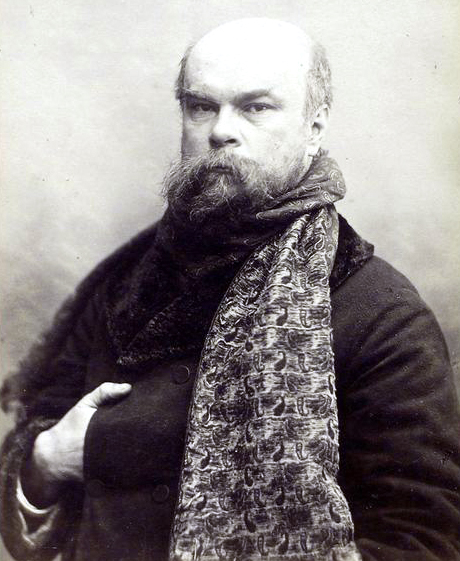
Photo (1893) of Paul Verlaine, by Otto Wegener, wearing a "very beautiful Charvet scarf"

The clientele of Charvet also included artists such as Charles Baudelaire, who gave a metaphysical dimension to dandyism, George Sand, whose lover Alfred de Musset never succeeded to become a member of the Jockey Club, Édouard Manet, nicknamed the "dandy of painting" or Jacques Offenbach, composer of La Vie Parisienne. In 1893, when he tried to enter the Académie française, Verlaine had himself photographed wearing a "very beautiful Charvet scarf" (Figure, left). Allegedly, a gift of 100,000 francs to "the greatest poet of our time, Verlaine", was the stake of a bet between Edmond de Polignac and Robert de Montesquiou. Having lost the bet, Montesquiou "naturally kept the 100,000 francs but gave Verlaine a very beautiful scarf". Upon hearing the story, Polignac cut all relations with Montesquiou. Nevertheless, some other writers consider this story as a legend circulated by Montesquiou himself, as no document establishes the existence of this bet and Montesquiou was almost the only one in the elegant and cultured world to care for Verlaine.

In 1894, an administrative report praised Charvet for constantly seeking high-novelty and setting the trend for other Parisian shirtmakers, having irreproachable manufacturing standards, and successfully enticing French factories to produce the raw materials traditionally supplied by England.

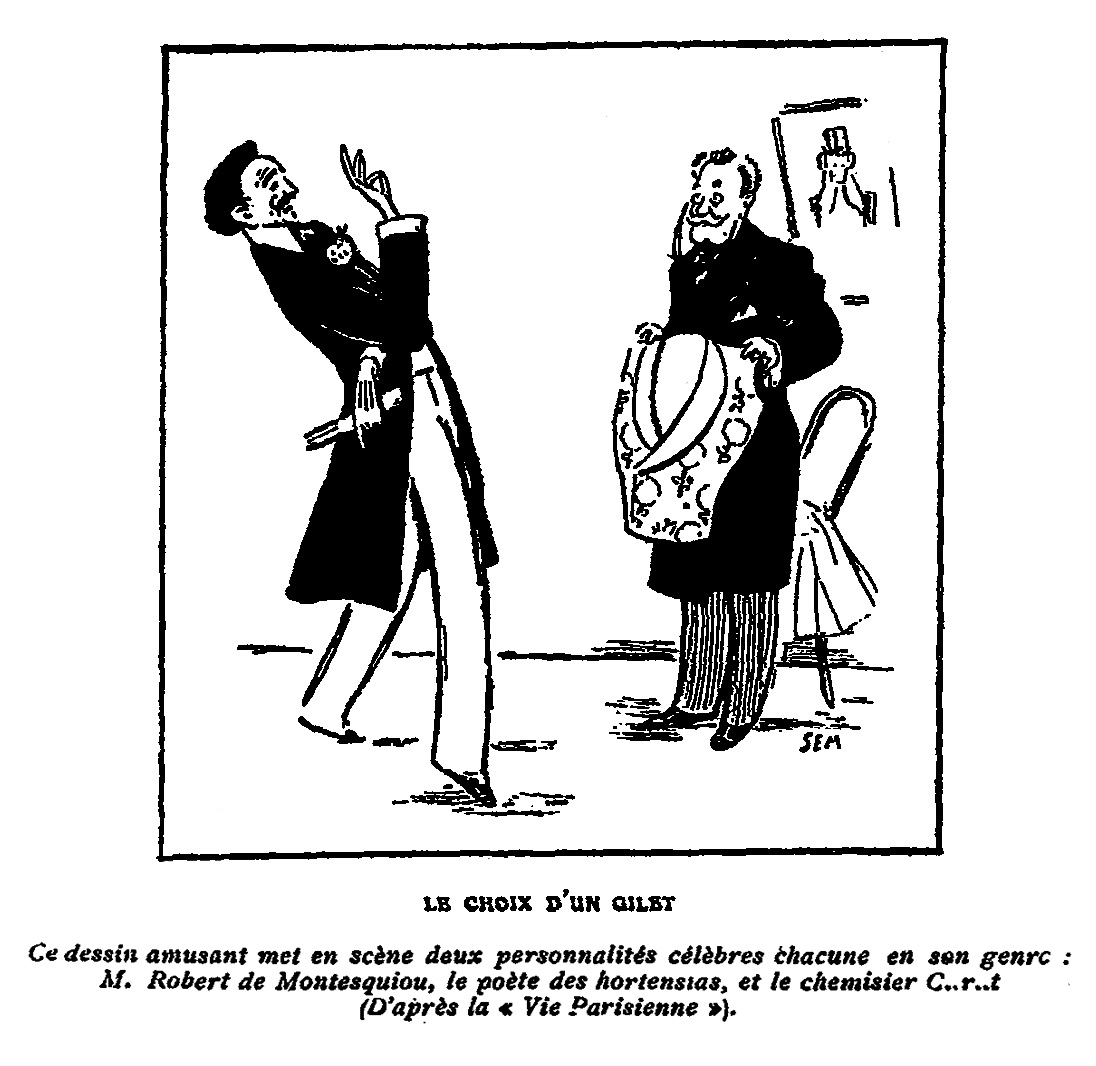
Caricature (1903) by Sem of Édouard Charvet showing a waistcoat to Robert de Montesquiou

After his 1897 portrait by Giovanni Boldini, Montesquiou's dandyism became famous and made him a frequent subject of caricatures. In 1903, a French satirical magazine illustrated by a caricature from Sem to which Marcel Proust alluded in a letter to Montesquiou, had Montesquiou saying: "Nobody in the world ever saw such things! Pinks, blues, lilacs, in silk, and in cobweb! Charvet is the greatest artist in the Creation." In a letter to Montesquiou, alludes to the caricature by Sem of Montesquiou examining products at Charvet (Figure, right).

In 1905, Charvet, then also established in London, at 45 New Bond Street, and "rumored" to be contemplating an establishment in New York, was considered the "foremost haberdashery of Paris and London". Its customers included not only royalty, such as Alfonso XIII of Spain (warrant granted in 1913); Edward VIII, duke of Windsor; the French president Paul Deschanel, noted for his elegant Charvet cravats; but also members of the high society gravitating around dandies such as Robert de Montesquiou and Evander Berry Wall, or artists as Jean Cocteau, who called Charvet "magic" and wrote that it is "where the rainbow finds ideas", and his friend Sergei Diaghilev. According to Proust, whose shirts, ties and waistcoats were from Charvet, maybe by imitation of Montesquiou, the latter was "the sign of a certain world, of a certain elegance". (Note: On the other hand, Laurent Tailhade considered that "if we have to deal with oafs, bear my fondness for "bourgeois". Their ties come from Charvet" and Paul Morand summed up the change of values at the start of the 20th century with the following question: "Why flaunt Charvet ties and have dirty feet?") Proust also spent long moments at Charvet in search of a perfect tone for his cravats, such as a "creamy pink". His tank tops (marcel in French) also came from Charvet. In his Remembrance of Things Past (1919), Marcel, the narrator, waiting for the appointed hour of his lunch engagement at Swann's house, whiles away his time "tightening from time to time the knot of [his] magnificent Charvet tie". In 1908, Charvet won a Grand Prix at the London Exhibition.

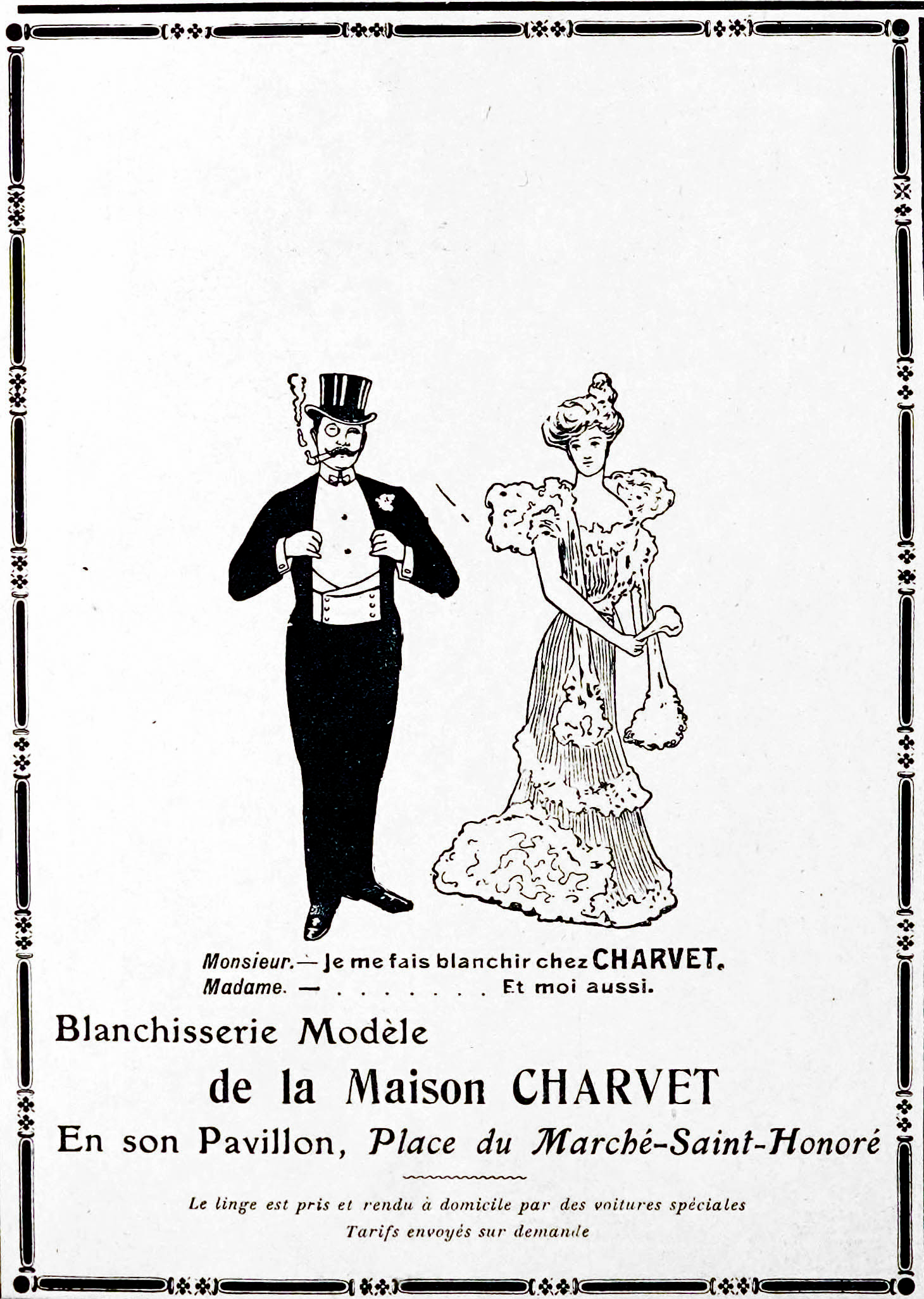
Advertisement (1903) for the Charvet laundry, later reproduced on stamps.

In 1901, Charvet opened a laundry at 3, rue des Capucines, next to his store, considered by some to be the first established in Paris, a fact which later led some others to assume Charvet's laundry business had predated shirtmaking. It was advertised as applying Pasteur's and Grancher's principles. In 1903, Charvet moved his "model laundry", to the place du Marché Saint Honoré, on premises belonging to the city of Paris, which specially authorized him in view of an innovative ozone-based process, then licensed to the Parisian hospitals. The soiled clothes, picked up at the customer's house by "special cars", were disinfected and bleached with ozone, then placed in a revolving drum worked by electricity and soaked in a diastatic solution, in order to remove the starch and make the linen whiter, subsequently washed in soap and water, afterwards in a solution of ammonia to remove the soap, then whitened, starched, calendered and hand ironed. The process was considered a model both for the quality of the output and for the care taken of the health of the workers. A "surprising" amount of laundry was sent over by British customers. Like many other foreign customers, William Stewart Halsted and William H. Welch regularly sent their shirts to be laundered to Charvet in Paris. (Note: In his account of the imaginary correspondence between Pandit Motilal Nehru and a Parisian laundry in the year 1903, S.J. Perelman mused on the complications of such overseas dispatches and the implied "limitless wardrobe".) Promotional stamps were produced for this laundry business and became collectible. In 1906, a branch of the laundry was opened at 1, rue du Colisée, near the Champs-Élysées. During World War I, Charvet significantly reduced the price of its laundry services to keep sufficient work for all his employees. Towards the end of the war, the shortage of coal severely hit Charvet's laundry activity. The "model laundry" of place du marché Saint Honoré was discontinued in 1933 when the place was restructured.

Views of the Charvet model laundries

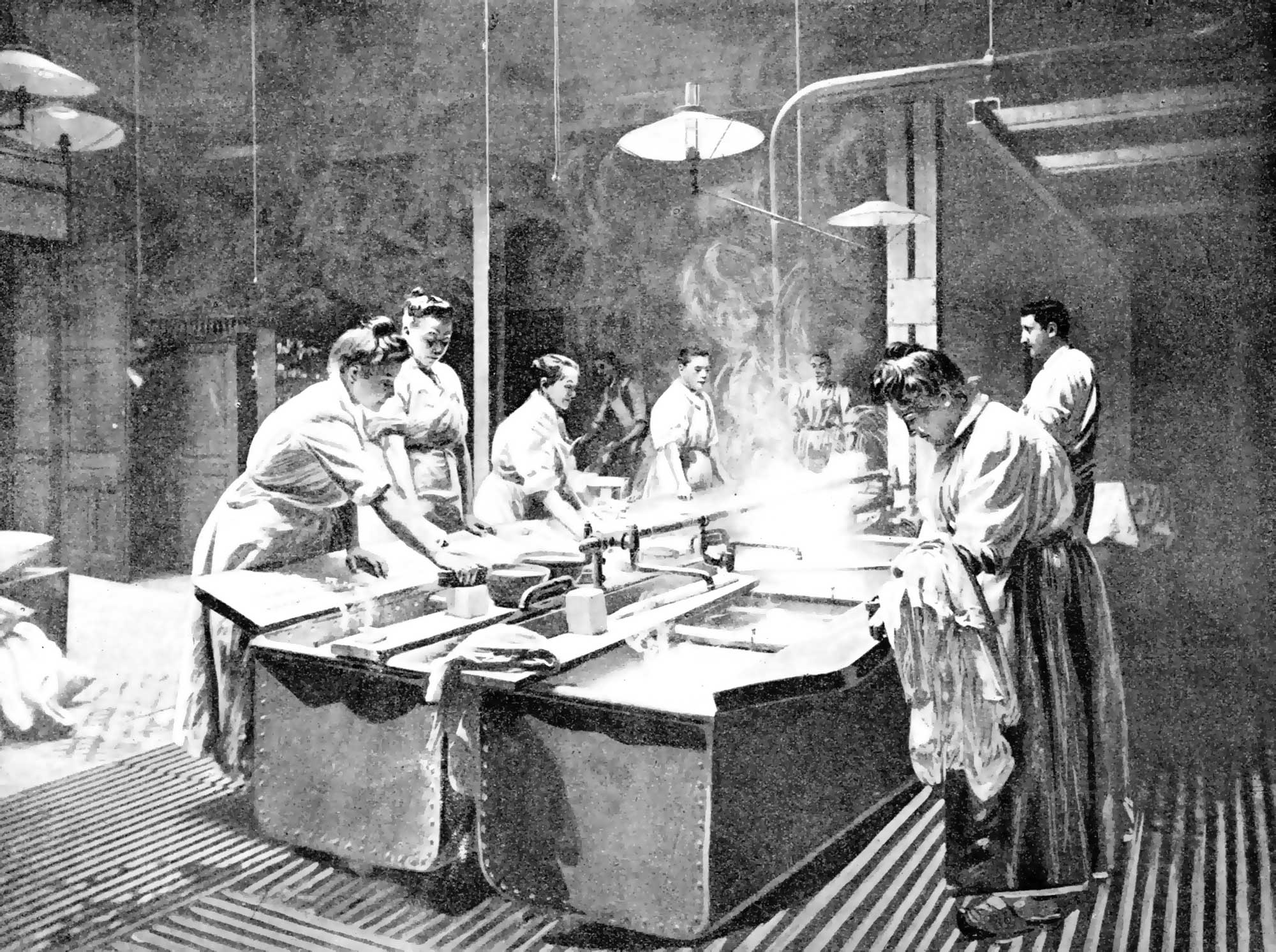
Photo (1901). Separate soaping and soaking at the 1st model laundry, rue des Capucines.

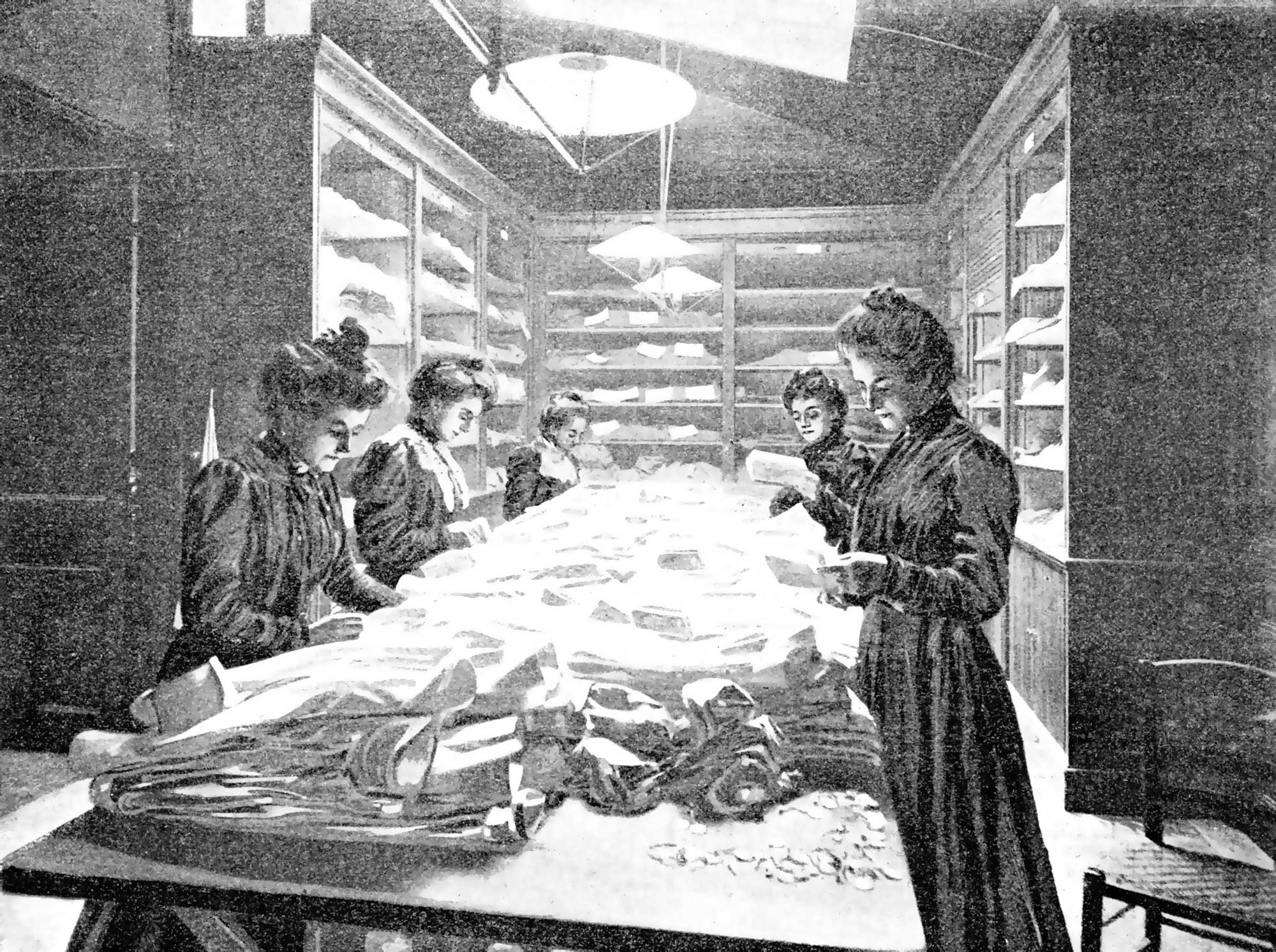
Photo (1901). Checking and sorting at the 1st model laundry.

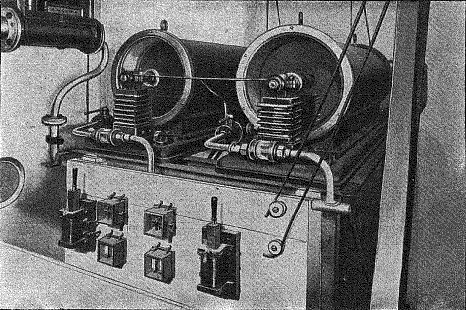
Photo (1903). Ozone generators in the 2nd model laundry, place du Marché Saint Honoré

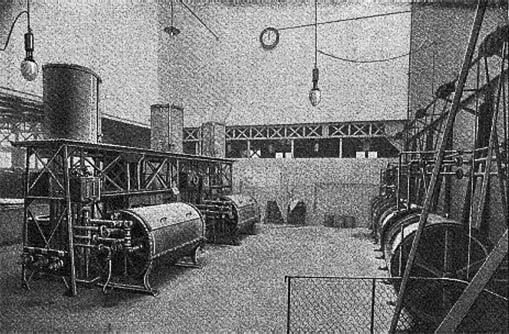
Mechanical washing machines in the 2nd model laundry.

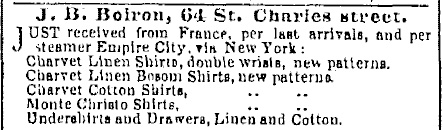
Advertisement (1853) for a receipt of Charvet shirts in New Orleans

Charvet shirts were imported into the United States as early as 1853 (See figure right). By 1860, Charvet's shirts turnover was equally divided between luxury bespoke shirts sold in the Paris store and ready made shirts for export, particularly to Russia, Great-Britain and Havana. Also, following the custom of the time, designs and models were sold to American stores, to be locally reproduced. In the 1920s, Charvet's name was associated in the United States with linen fabrics in "startingly floreated" patterns, used for shirt bibs and cuffs. Nevertheless, into the middle of the 20th century, Charvet was selling only bespoke shirts in the Paris store. (Note: The beginning of Gilles, Drieu la Rochelle's major work, shows the eponymous hero told in 1917 by Charvet that he is not doing ready-to-wear shirts.)

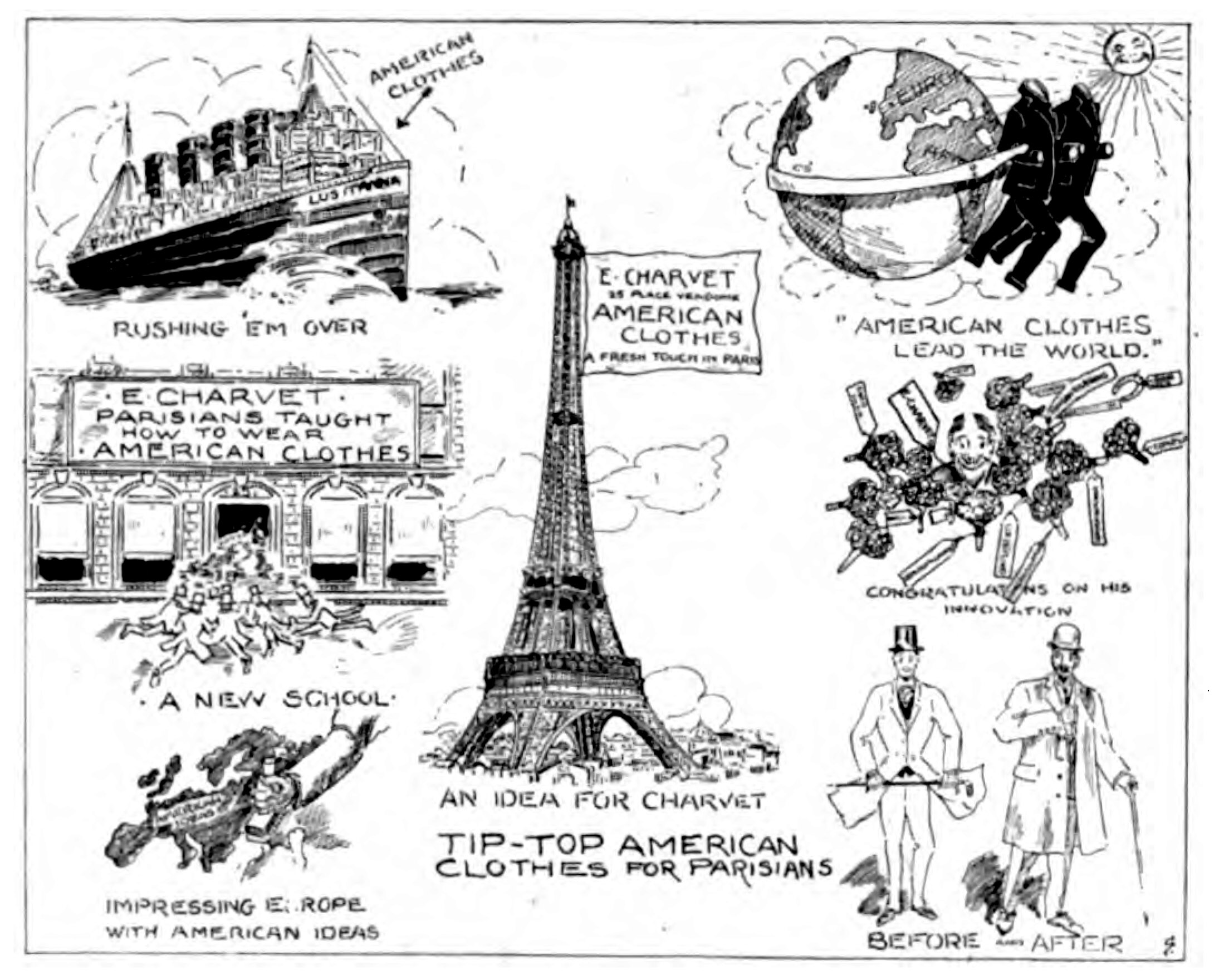
Cartoon (1908) about the announced importation by E. Charvet of clothing produced in Chicago

In 1908, Charvet was the first European company to import American suits hand tailored in Chicago.

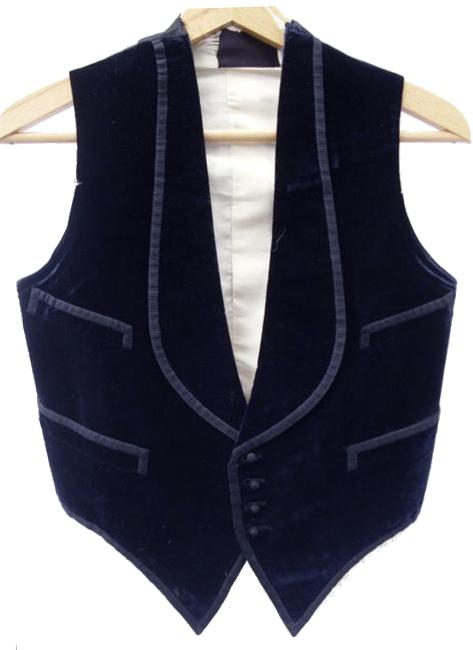
Blue velvet waistcoat (1907).

The name Charvet was so well known that it became associated with a certain silk fabric for ties (See Charvet (fabric)). Charvet's notability also extended to other items of clothing, such as shirts, (Note: Charvet's prominent position called for constant innovation, such as a "one thousand pleats" shirt for tuxedo wear, which actually counted 178 extremely fine tucks on each side.) shirtings, (Note: At the start of the 20th century, an American advertisement called Charvet the "master-mind of French modes in shirtings". "Charvet of Paris leads the Old World in the charm of the fabrics he has woven. We have his weaver working for us as well", boasted another one.) ties, gloves, dress suits, (Note: In 1909, for the Chicago Tribune, Charvet and Henry Poole & Co were "authorities" who "not only keep abreast of the times but may be called pioneers in the matters of fashions for men.) waistcoats (see image, left), (Note: The French painter Maurice Lobre wrote in 1903 to Robert de Montesquiou that "Charvet wants to do marvels for you ... He is practising on me, making vests which are masterpieces from the back, the front, the top and the bottom.") (Note: Charvet is credited with the invention of the strait waistcoat with a rolling shawl collar. The company introduced pale gray waistcoats for evening wear and the black satin vest. Its fancy waistcoats were first worn in the United States, towards the end of the 19th century, by Henry Clews and were afterwards also referred to as "Imandt Grand Prix" vests.) undergarments, (Note: Henry Clay Frick's silk-and-wool undergarments bore ornate monograms and discreetly revealed the Parisian haberdasher's name in the weave of the fabric.) pocketchieves, and women's waistbands or shirtwaists (See figures left), worn with special models of ties for ladies, such as one called le juge modeled after a judge's lappets. The Chicago Tribune reported in 1909 that Charvet was showing "scarf pins that match in color any scarf that may be bought and some have the same designs carried out in them done in enamel. There are also waistcoasts buttons to be worn with certain ties and there are sets of these, cufflinks, and pins, all of which exactly match". Charvet also supplied silk bed-sheets in colours such as black, green, mauve or violet.

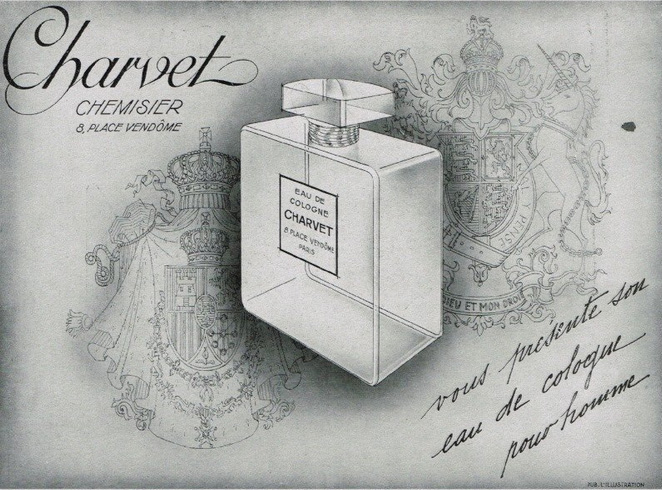
Advertisement for Charvet's toilet water (1931). The Royal Warrant of Spain and the Royal Warrant of the United Kingdom can be seen in the foreground

In the early 20th century, Charvet launched a toilet water, in a rectangular beveled bottle. One of the customers for this perfume was Boy Capel, Coco Chanel's lover. In 1921, two years after his accidental death, the flacon of Chanel's famous Nº 5 perfume was produced in the image of the Charvet bottle.

Like many European companies, Charvet was greatly affected by World War I: "our looms have been destroyed, our collections pillaged, our printing blocks burned". Nevertheless, it continued to send representatives to the United States to show collections of novelties.

Views of corsages, chemisettes and shirtwaists 1896 - 1898

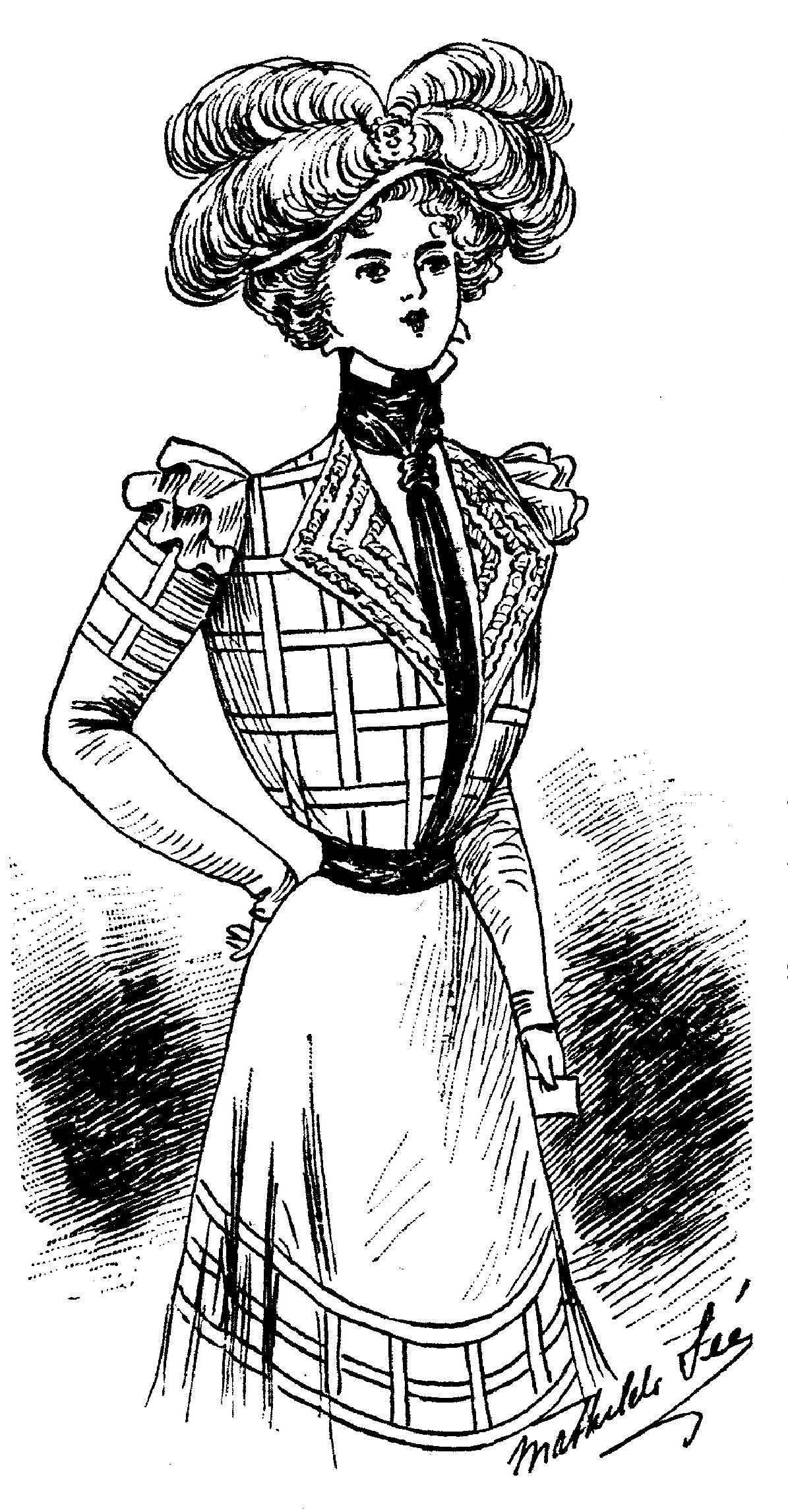
Sketch (1898) of a dress with chemisette and cravat

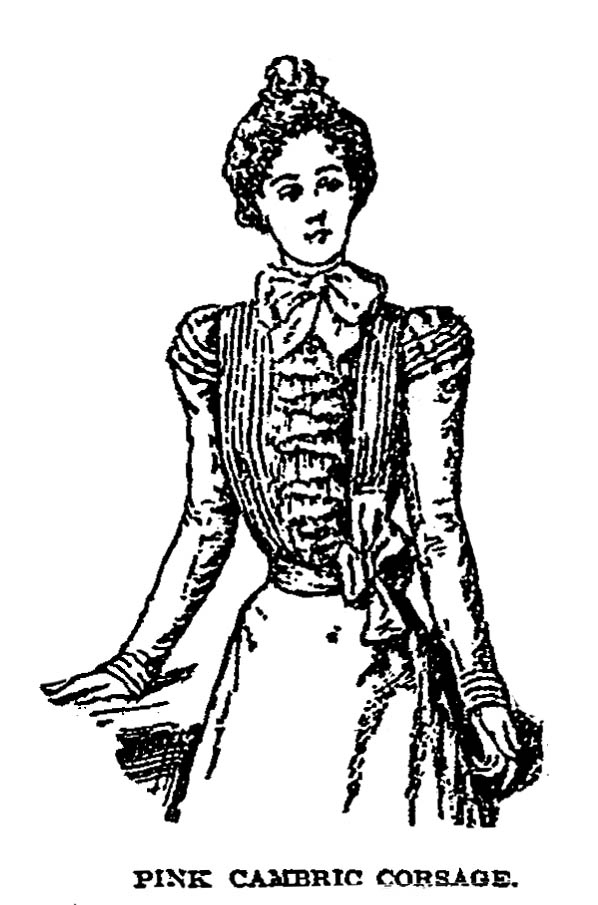
Sketch (1898) of a corsage with matching scarf and waistband

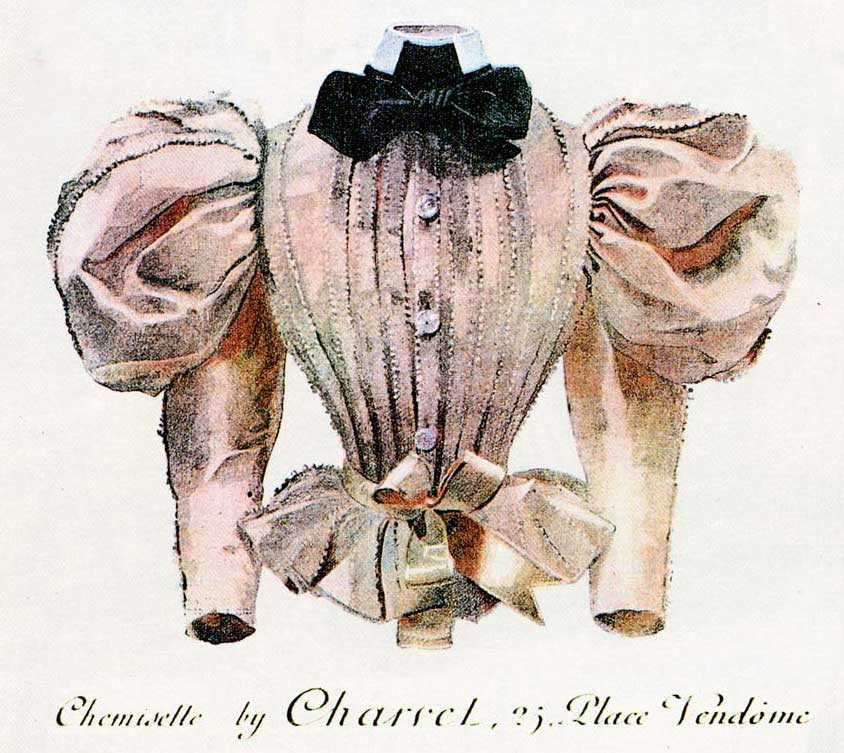
Advertisement (1896) for a pleated and ruffled chemisette

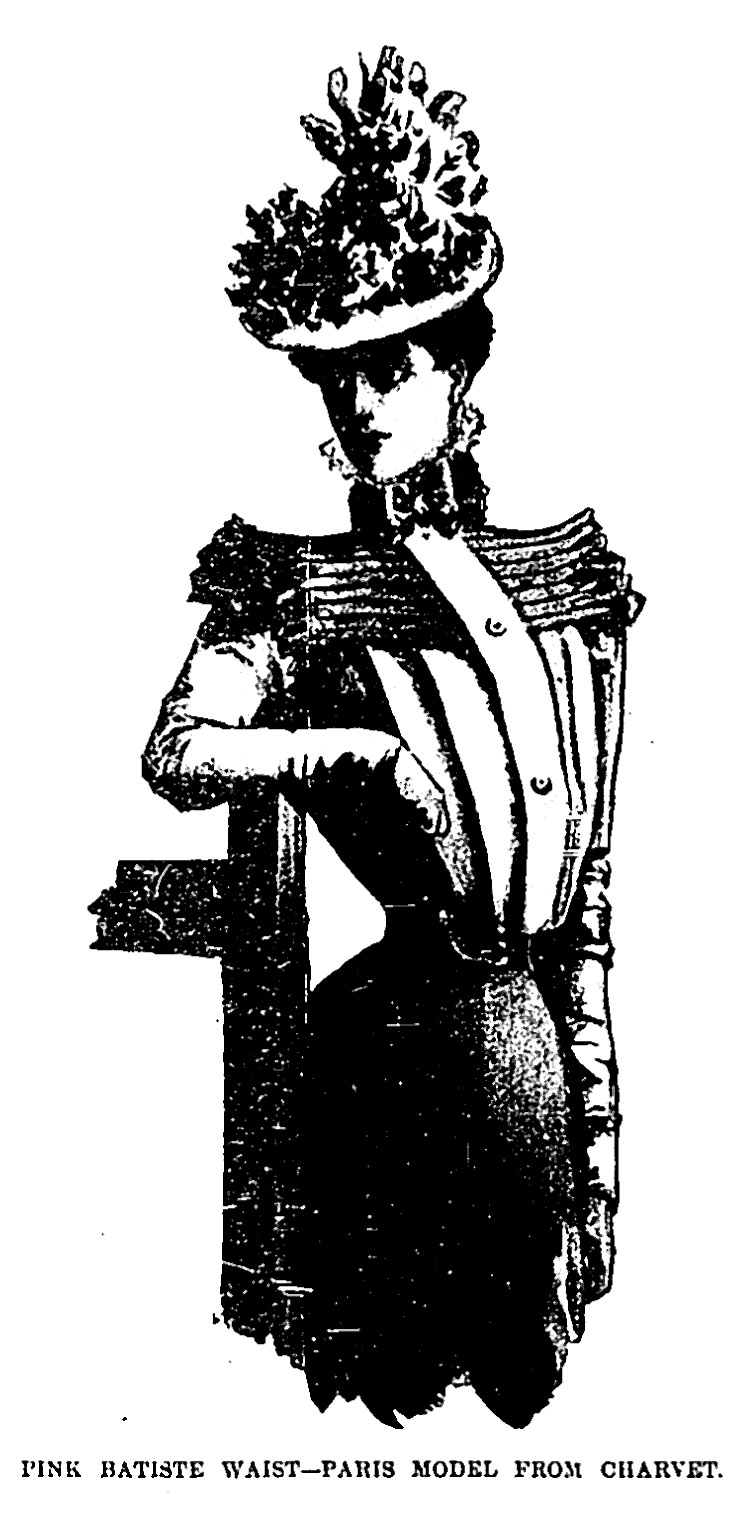
Sketch (1898) of a shirtwaist in batiste

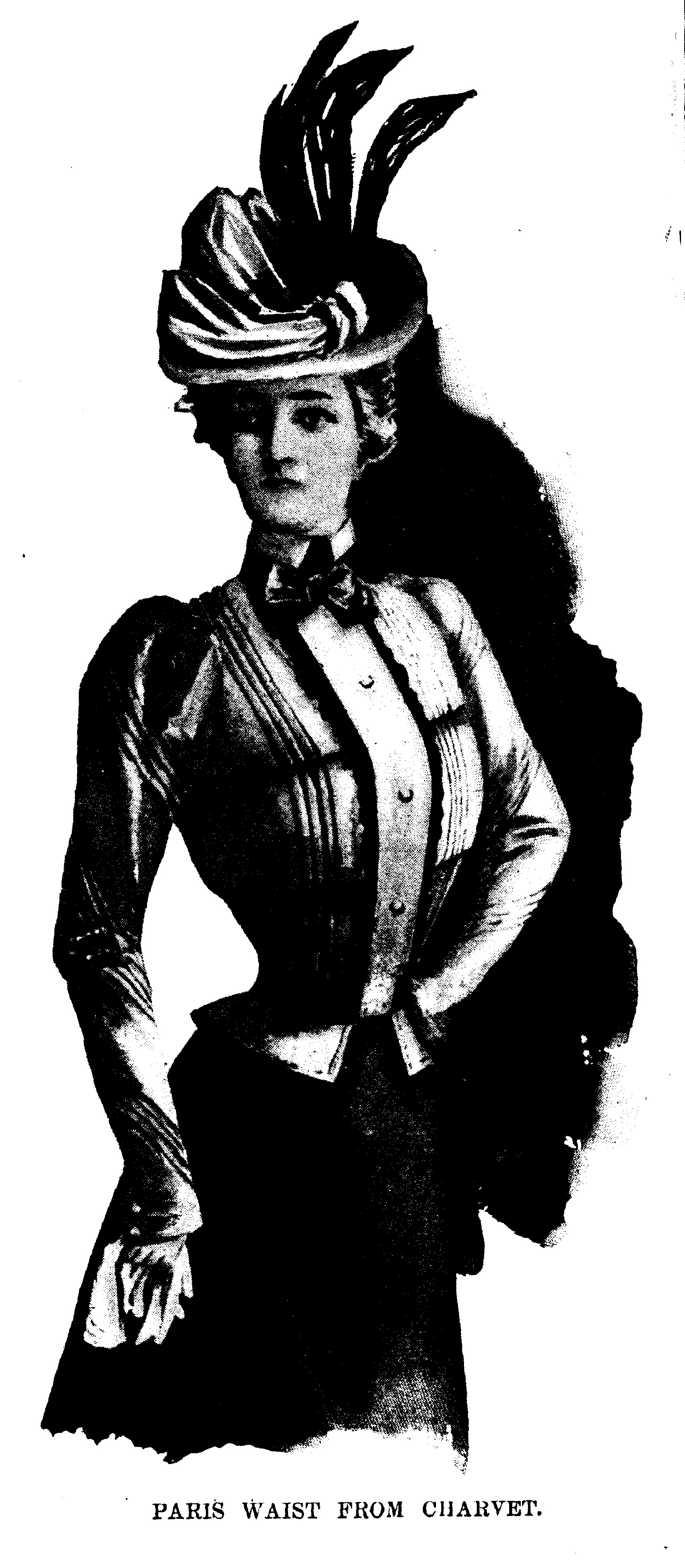
Sketch (1898) of a shirtwaist in linon

=== Art Deco period ===
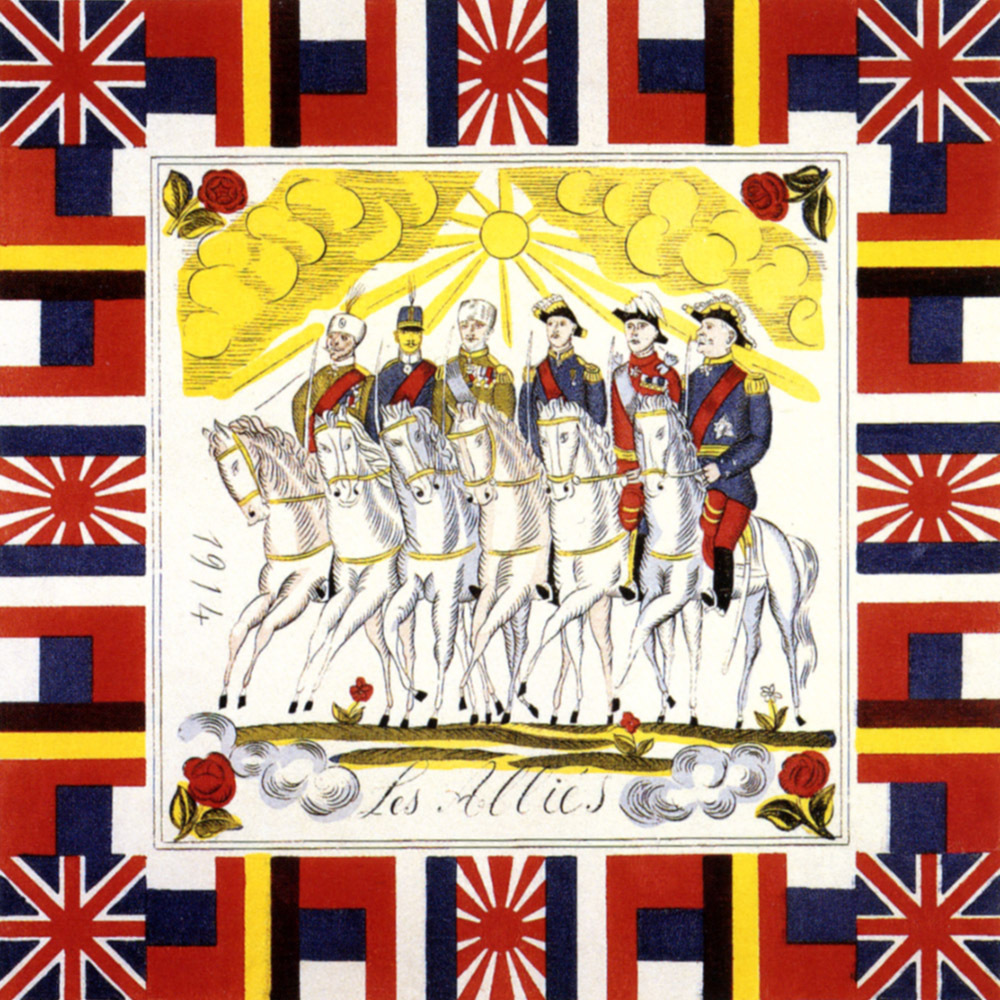
Les Alliés, handkerchief (1915).

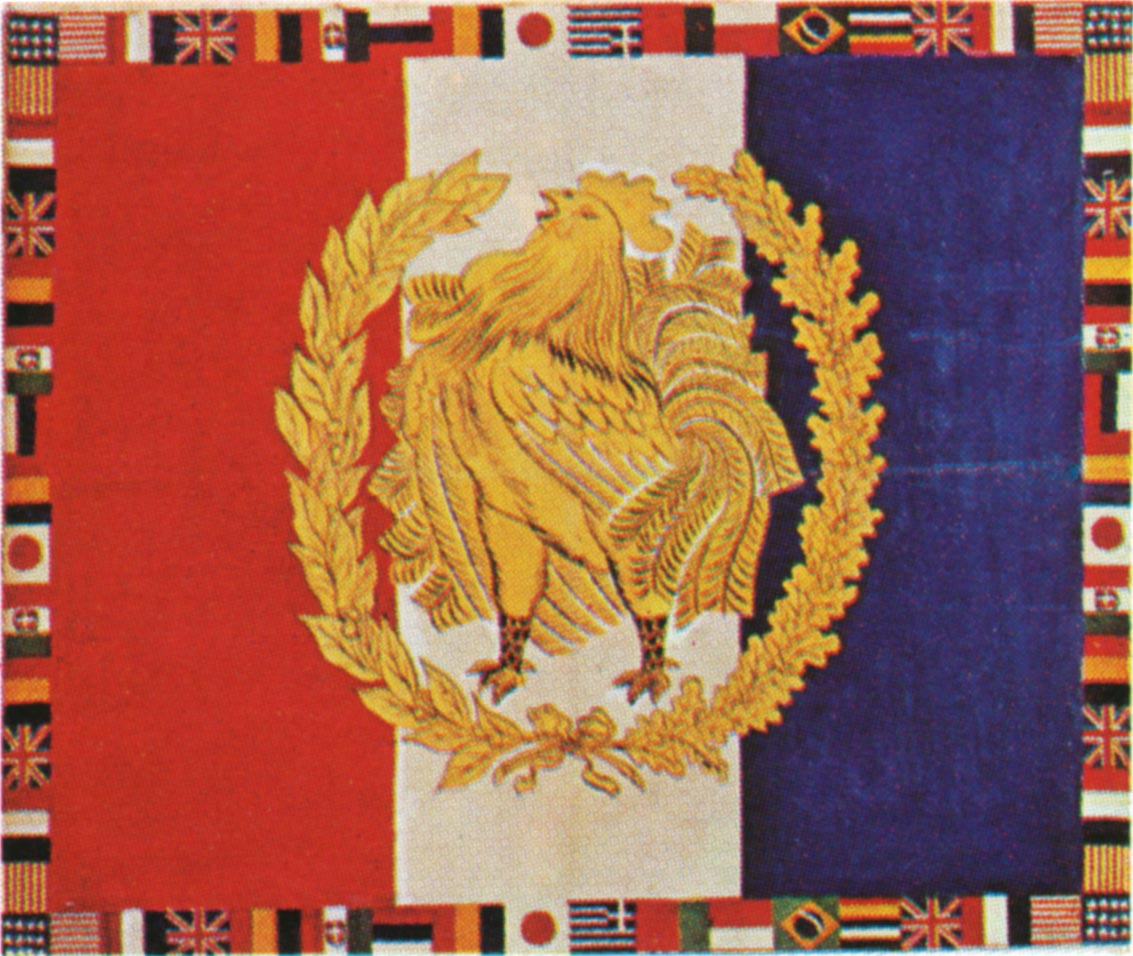
Victory Rooster, silk square (1918).

Some designs by Raoul Dufy for Charvet.

After 1912, with the development of the Art Deco style, Charvet, along with fashion designer Paul Poiret, started to commission art work from the French painter Raoul Dufy, the "granddaddy of modem chic", through the French weaver Bianchini-Férier. Some of the first were related to the war, such as Les Alliés or the Victory Rooster (Figure, left). This was followed by more silk squares, woven silk fabrics for vests, and printed ramie fabrics for dressing gowns and shirts. Some famous customers of the period were fashion designer Coco Chanel (Note: Chanel designed some costumes for Diaghilev's Ballets Russes. In 1928, she dressed the Muses in Balanchine's Apollon Musagète with a free adaptation of the antique tunic, whose pleats were bound with the silk of three Charvet ties.) and the Maharadjah of Patiala who once placed a single order of 86 dozen shirts.

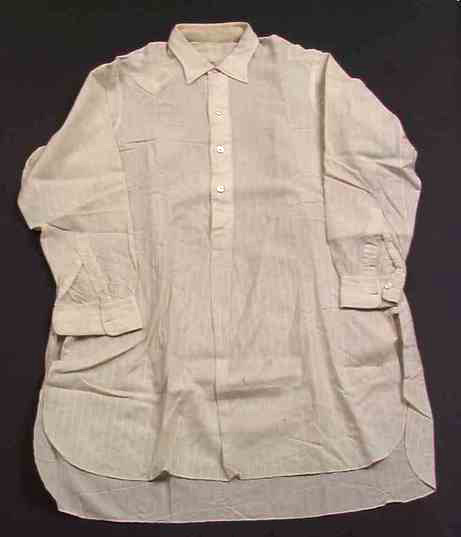
Photo of a Charvet shirt from the 1930s. Woven wool, striped. Norsk Folkemuseum, Oslo.

In the late 1920s, Charvet was considered to produce "the finest cravats in the world", with either conservative designs or "decidedly original" patterns, such as postage-stamps (See below) or much more "modernist" patterns. At an exhibition called "L'art de la soie" held at the Musée Galliera in Paris in 1927, Charvet presented dressing gowns and neckties in matching patterns, together with pyjamas, shirts and handherchieves. The company developed a practice of sending merchandises to its customers for approval, allowing them to select some or none and return the rest, subsequently referred to as the Charvet method. It conceived a range of free-form bold printed tie patterns which gained wide popularity in the USA. (Note: This popularity even reached Al Capone, Frank Costello and Lucky Luciano.) "Its chic was in their unfussy, nonchalant bearing. To the delight of their many admirers, the Charvets' open settings facilitated blending with all kind of fancy suits ... The original Charvet prints became the first, and regrettably almost the last, bold figured necktie to symbolize upper-class taste". Some such bold Charvet Art Deco ties which had belonged to John Ringling are on display at the John and Mable Ringling Museum of Art. These patterns, for which charvet became a generic name, "foreshadowed" the colorful designs which became popular after the war. The company also produced beach linen robes with patterns up to two feet in diameter.

In the 1930s, some window displays were made by painters as André Derain or Maurice de Vlaminck.

=== Colban's takeover ===
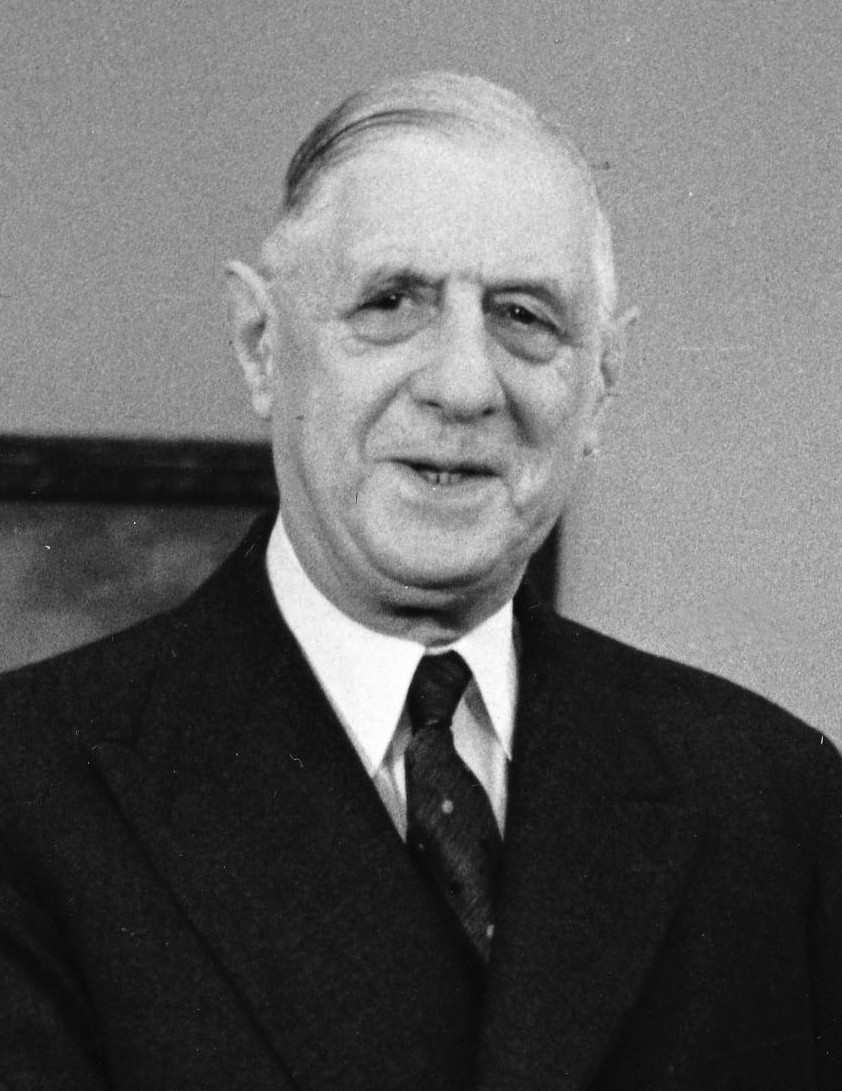
Photo (1963) of De Gaulle wearing his traditional Charvet white shirt and black tie.

When in 1965 the Charvet heirs sought to sell the firm, they were contacted by an American buyer. The French government, knowing Charvet had been for a long time General de Gaulle's shirtmaker, (Note: All De Gaulle's shirts and ties came from Charvet. It was always his wife who bought them.) grew concerned. The French Ministry of Industry instructed Denis Colban, Charvet's main supplier, to locate a French buyer. Rather than approaching investors he decided to purchase the company himself.

Until then, Charvet was operated in much the same way as it had been since its foundation: a customer was shown only what he requested, in most cases something fairly conservative. After Mr. Colban bought the firm, things changed. The change started when Baron Rothschild came into the store and asked to see some shirting fabrics, one of which was pink. When M. Colban, following previous Charvet practice, advised against the color, the Baron retorted, "If not for me, who is it for?" Some time later, Nelson Rockefeller requested some shirt swatches be sent to New York. Bold stripes and unusual colors were sent and eventually selected. Colban had changed Charvet's policies as well as its role in the design process with the customer. A wide range of products was put on display, transforming the store in a "veritable casbah" of colors and "almost edible" fabrics. Colban also brought significant changes to the aspect of the store, having all the venerable furniture varnished in black. He created new lines of products and started ready-to-wear finely made shirts for men and women. A few years after, he was one of the first of many famous European shops and designers to sell ready-to-wear shirts, ties and accessories to Bergdorf Goodman. However, even while developing these new pre-made lines of products, Colban always insisted on the bespoke aspect of the firm as its core identity. He emphasised that "the essential hardest of all to accomplish in today's world of quick and easy pseudo solutions, is an atmosphere of 'yes' to the customer and, even more, a respect for that commitment", re-iterating the focus of Charvet on its bespoke business.

Colban refused numerous offers to sell the company, maintaining the single store in Paris and continuing the house as a family business. After his death in 1994, the company has been managed by his two children, Anne-Marie and Jean-Claude.

=== Chanel acquisition ===
In 2026, Charvet was acquired by Chanel.

== Charvet today ==
Of the five most prominent French shirtmakers of the 20th century—Bouvin, Charvet, Poirier, Seelio, and Seymous—all but Charvet have closed. It is also the only remaining shirtmaker on Place Vendôme.

The goal of the company is to give its customers the option to custom order or customize everything it sells, from neckwear (including bow ties) to underwear, with "the idea that a garment that carries a personal stamp exceeds any other form of luxury". Bolts of fabric on display throughout the store can be held against oneself to see how they really look. Charvet creates exclusive fabrics for all its collections and prides itself of going a long way to satisfy customers, remaking on request ties purchased years earlier or changing a shirt's frayed collar and cuffs.

=== Store ===
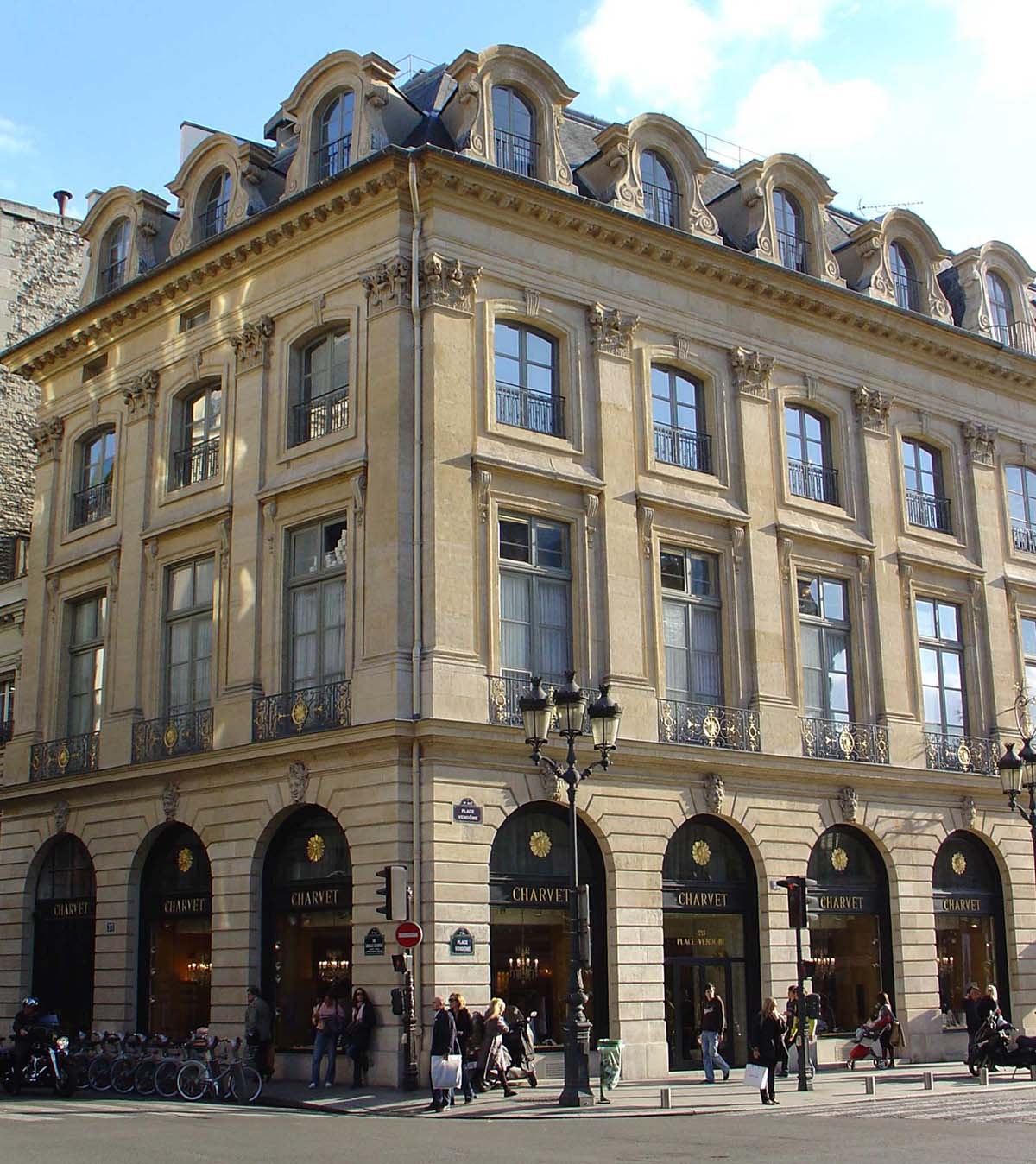
The Place Vendôme store

The store is located in one of the hôtels particuliers of Place Vendôme, Number 28. This building has a three-story Jules Hardouin Mansart facade, behind which Charvet occupies seven floors, each owner on the Place having built to his own needs. This is the only store directly operated by Charvet.

Per Denis Colban's merchandising ideas, the ground floor offers a contrast between the formality of the setting and the seemingly informal abundance of silk accessories, from ties to scarves to the "signature" silk passementerie-knot cufflinks invented here. (Note: Before acquiring its fame for the silk knots it introduced in 1904, Charvet had developed in the 19th century jewel cufflinks with his neighbor, the jeweler Cartier, including, around 1860, the then "famous boutons hongrois". At the end of the 20th century, Charvet also became "famous [for the] Charvet silk knot, but in 24-carat gold".) Each necktie comes in at least two dozen colorways and new designs arrive each week.

Ready-to-wear shirts and at-home clothing are displayed on the fourth floor, ready-to-wear blouses on the second floor, and children's shirts on the first floor, but the third floor is dedicated to bespoke shirtmaking. This "centre of the universe for shirt aficionados" could be the largest selection of fine shirtings in the world, with over 6,000 different fabrics, including a "legendary" Mur des Blancs (Wall of Whites) of four hundred different white fabrics in 104 shades of white and another of two hundred solid blues. Customers can "debate not just the shade of white, not just the choice of cuff, not just the angle, depth and proportion of the collar, but also the infinitesimal differences in the weight of the interlining in collar and cuff and how this can and should be varied between formal, semi-formal and casual shirts". The richly colored and unique" fabrics are presented in full bolts, not on swatch cards. Most of them are designed in-house by Charvet, for its own exclusive use and woven from specially chosen Gossypium barbadense cotton from the Nile delta. About a thousand new patterns are introduced each year, all of them registered. The Charvet stripes are often multicolored, asymmetric, thinner than English stripes, softer and subtler in the matching of shades.

Men's custom tailoring is on the sixth floor, which has the atmosphere of a men's club. Some 4,500 bolts of fabric are on display there, and the walls are hung with 1960s' fashion illustrations of Dean Martin look-alikes drawn by Jean Choiselat.

Views of the Place Vendôme store

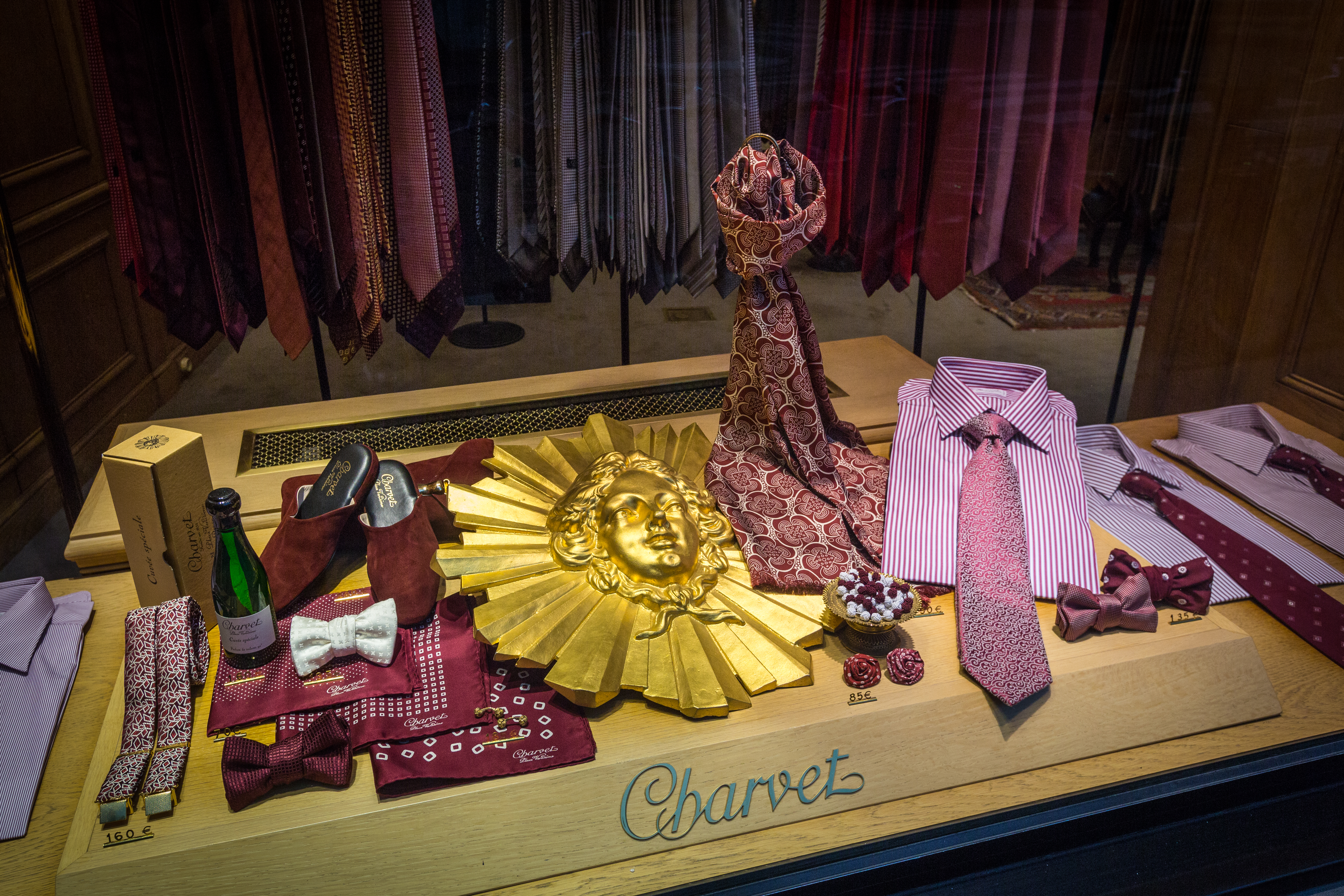
Shop window

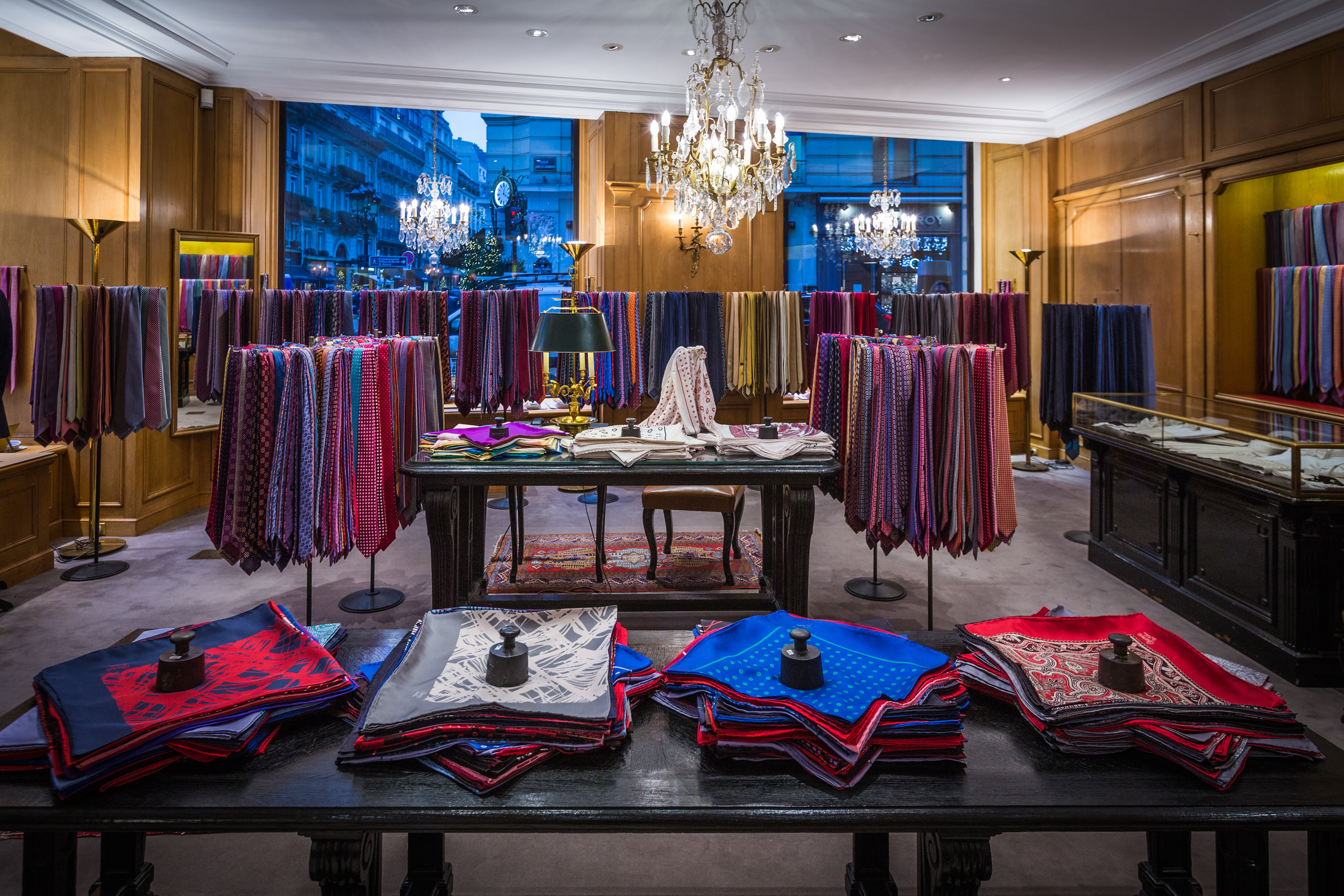
First floor

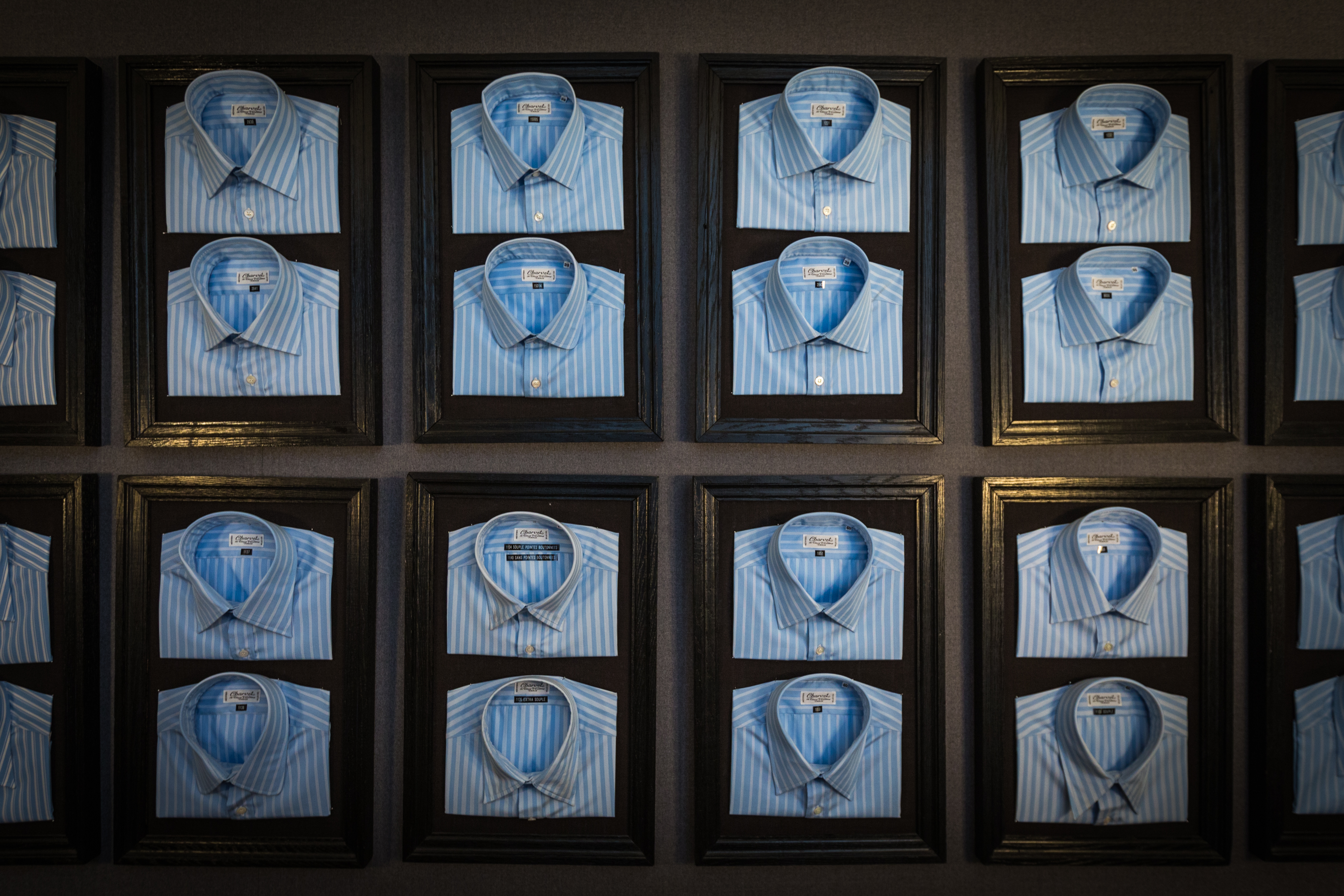
Third floor

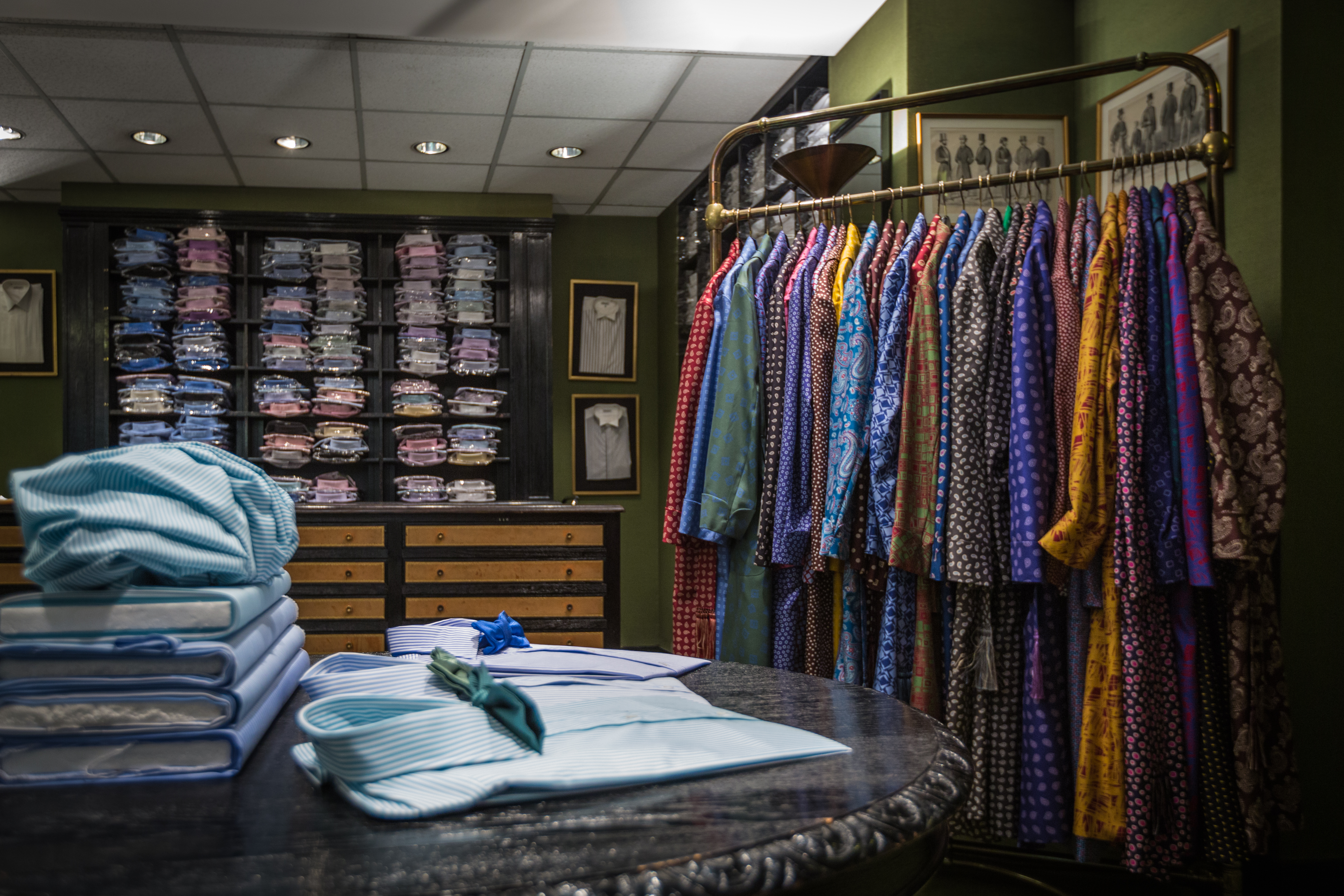
Fourth floor

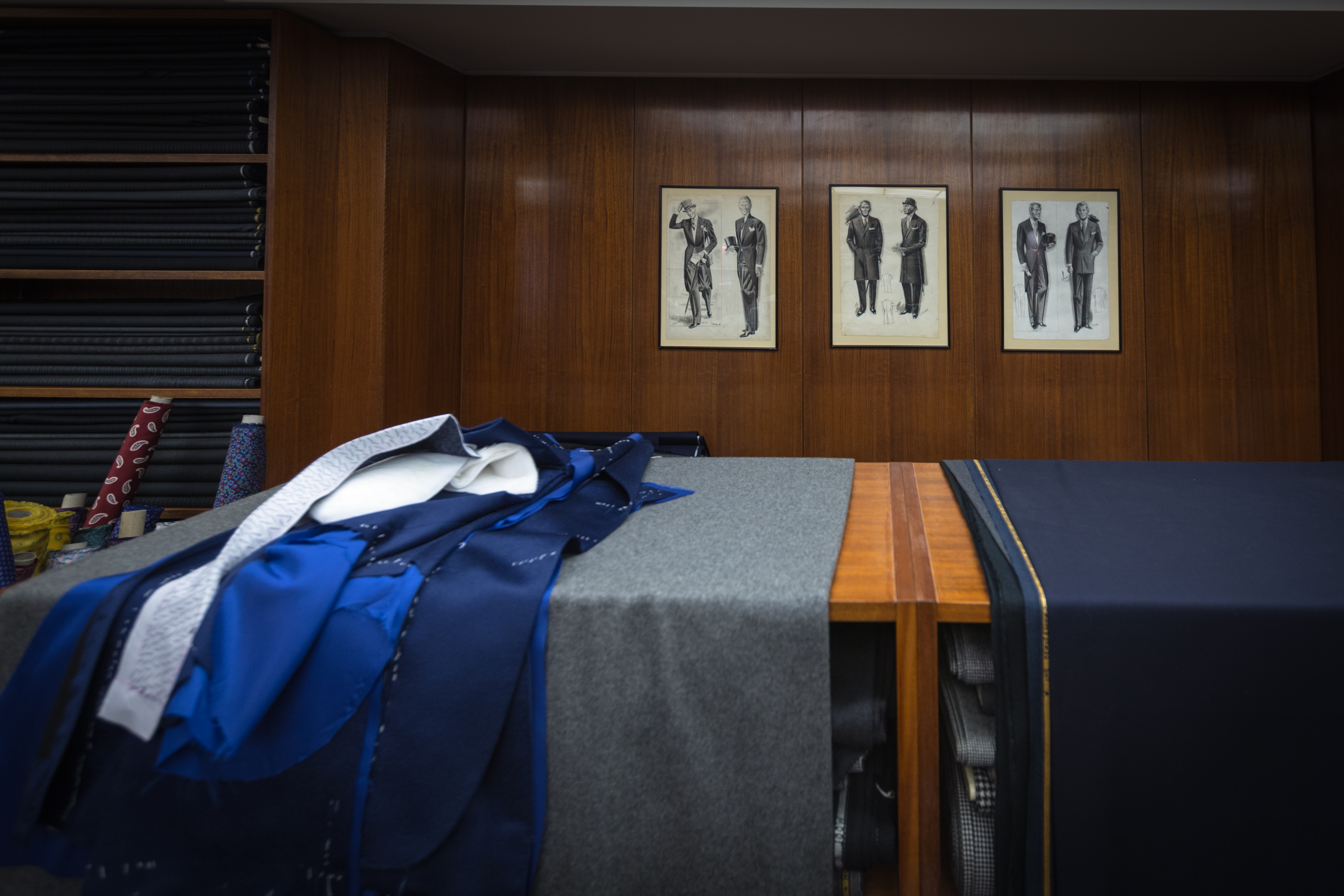
Sixth floor

=== Products ===
Shirts

The "unique" care for precision and symmetry expresses French classicism (Note: "Charvet is profoundly faithful to the soul of France" said Jean-Louis Dumas, a former CEO of Hermès.) and is, according to Marie-Claude Siccard, a paradigm of the care for quality in luxury products. In particular, a lot of attention is given to the regularity of stitches and the matching of patterns. On a typical striped ready-to-wear shirt and unlike most other makes, the placket is matched with the front, the face of the collar with the bottom, the collar stripes line up with the yoke stripes, the yoke stripes with the sleeve stripes, the sleeve stripes with the sleeve placket stripes, and finally the shade of yarn used for the buttonholes is matched to the stripe, the whole process creating the feeling the shirt is all one piece. The yoke is one-piece and curved to follow the back. The left cuff is made one-quarter inch longer than the right to allow for the watch. The allowance is lower for made-to-order shirts. The cuff is made more or less wide, depending if the customer wants his watch to remain hidden under the cuff or to show. According to a Charvet representative, many customers have two different types of shirts: those for evening wear, intended to be worn with a flat watch, and the others for day wear, with a thicker watch. For men, shirt tails are square and vented for a clean look. For women, they are rounded, with a signature side-seam gusset. The collar is very clean-cut, made from six layers of unfused cloth for a dressy, yet not stiff, appearance. Instead, a free floating stiffener aims to provide more comfort and a better shape. The stitching on a standard collar is four millimeters from the edge. The stitching of the top and the edges are precise and well-planned. The shirts are stitched with twin rows of single-needle tailoring, sewn one row at a time for minimum puckering and maximum fit. There are twenty stitches per inch. Buttons are made from Australian mother-of-pearl, cut from the surface of the oyster shell for added strength and greater color clarity. For formal shirts, bibs are hand pleated. Though its traditional ready-to-wear shirts are trim, the company has also introduced in 2009 a "slim fit" line.

The care involved in the process of making a bespoke shirt is, according to Lara Marlowe, an expression of French perfectionism. It requires a minimum of 28 measurements and an initial version made in basic cotton. The fit is "full and snug at the same time". The minimum order is one shirt. There are only fifty shirt-makers working in the Saint-Gaultier atelier and only one person works on a shirt at a time, whether custom or ready-to-wear, (Note: Ready to wear shirts are made in the same place and with the same standards as bespoke. "We cannot ask people in the morning to work slow and then to work fast in the afternoon", says Jean-Claude Colban.)doing everything except for the buttonholes and pressing the shirt. Each shirt takes thirty days to complete.

Charvet shirt's pattern matching

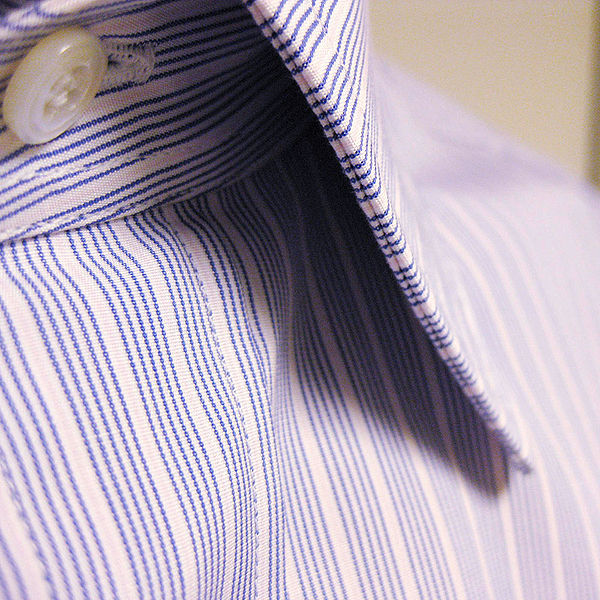
Collar top and bottom.

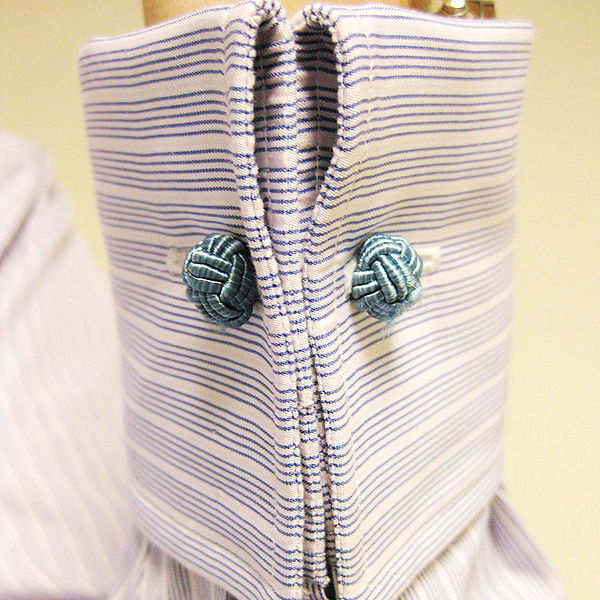
Cuff top and bottom.

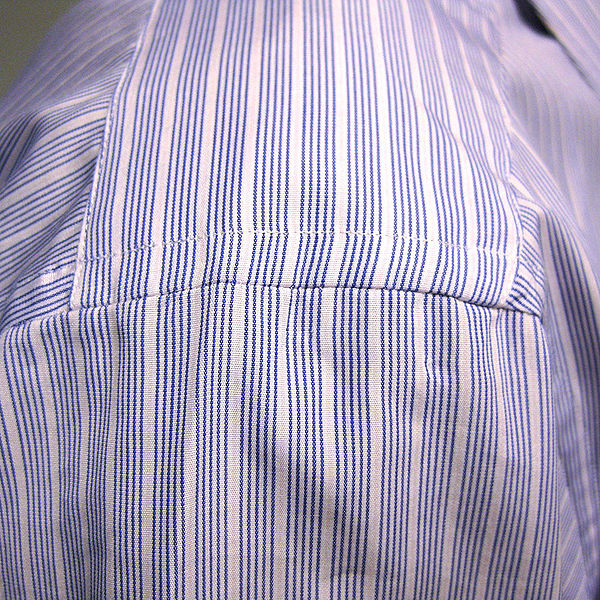
Sleeve and yoke.

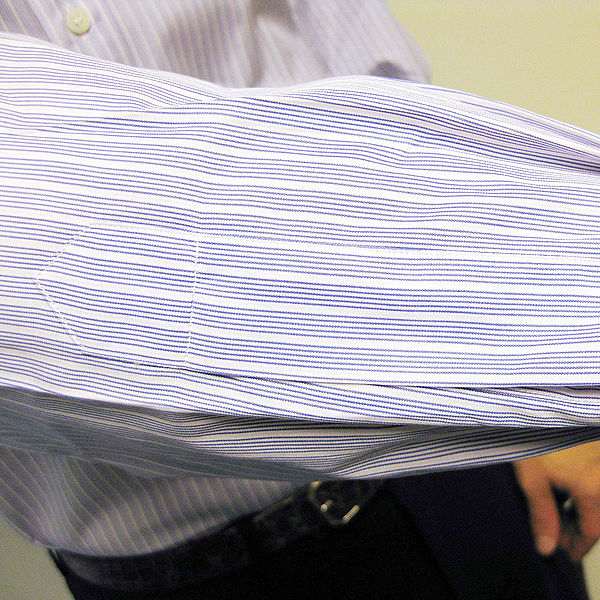
Sleeve and placket.

Pyjamas

The jacket is made of 14 pieces and the pants of 5. As for the shirts, patterns are matched throughout; depending on the pattern complexity, the production time is between 7 and 9 hours. Charvet pyjamas are, according to François Simon, a cult object. (Note: In James Neugass' Rain of Ashes (1947), the main character wants to be "buried in his monogrammed Charvet pyjamas". Patrick Leigh Fermor, a British travel writer, took on his trips to the Andes "Charvet pyjamas and fourteen bottles of airport whiskey".)

Neckwear

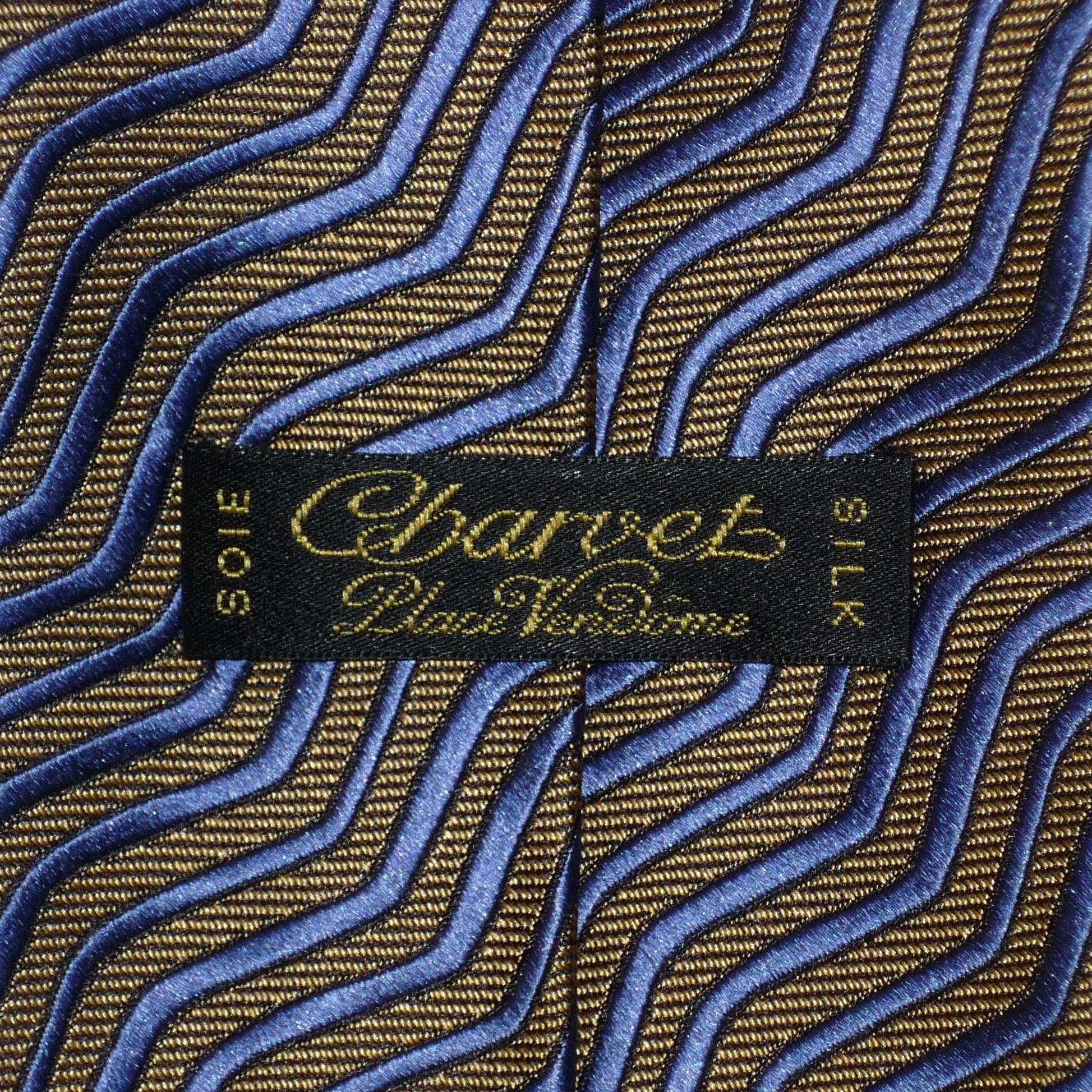
Close-up of the tie keeper with a woven label.

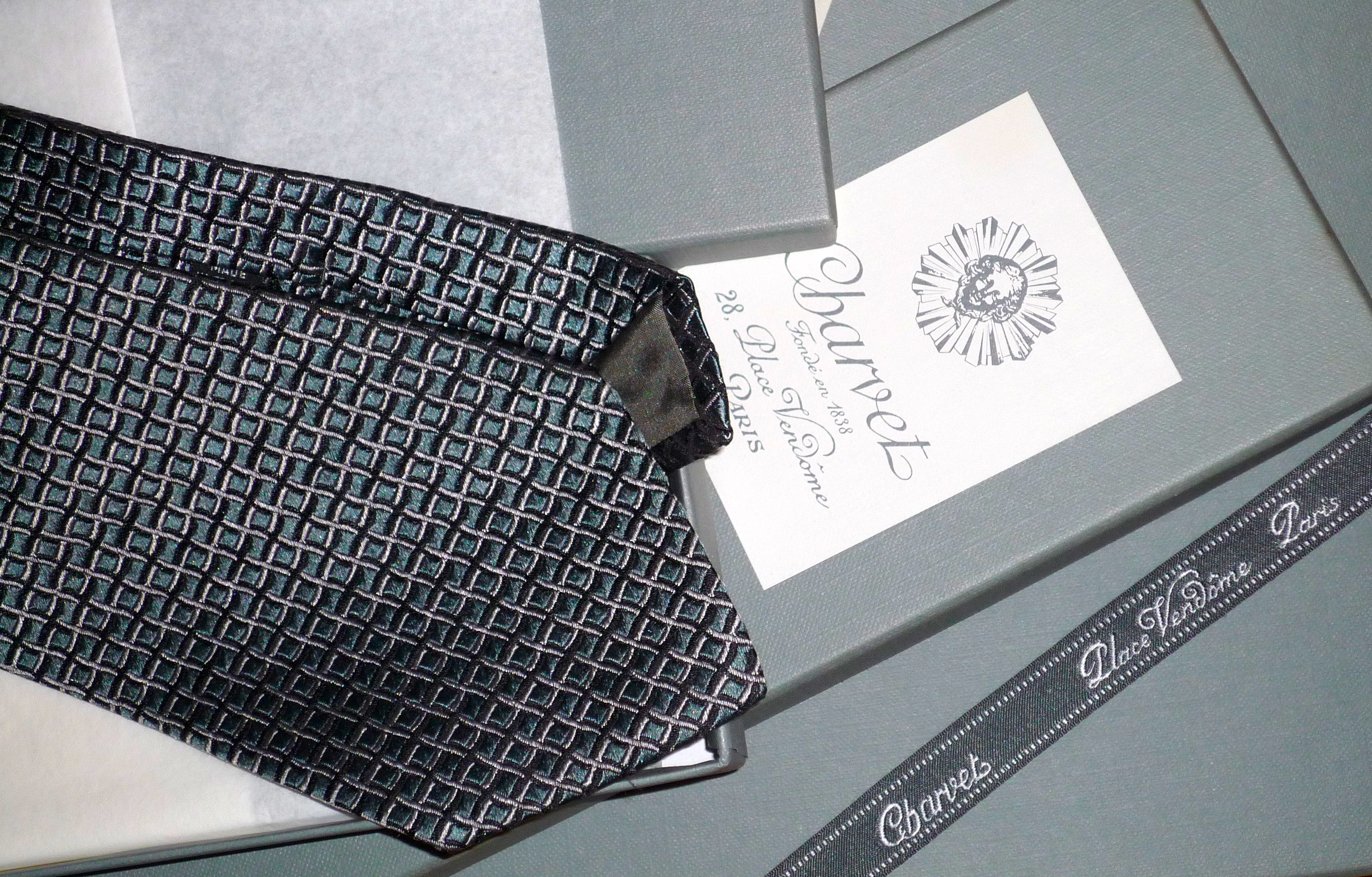
Woven tie, packaging ribbon and gift box.

Charvet ties, ranked as the best designer's ties in the US, are handmade, generally from a thick multicolor brocade silk, of a high yarn count, often enhanced by the addition of a hidden color, producing a dense fabric which goes through a proprietary finishing to acquire lustre, fluidity and resilience and achieve the right knot. The company develops its own exclusive patterns and colors. It creates about 8,000 models per year, Jacquard woven on exclusive commission, with silk either alone or mixed with other precious yarns, such as cashmere, camel hair, bamboo yarn or covered with laminated precious metals, such as silver, gold or platinum, with techniques dating back to the 14th century when the popes were based in Avignon, (Note: The Avignon Papacy is the origin of the introduction of silk weaving in France.) which were also used in the 1920s for vests. Further to a long history of brocade patterns, first used in the 19th century for vests and then for ties, Charvet offers, according to Bernhard Roetzel, the largest range of woven silk neckties in the world. The ties collection, sometime "unmistakably bold" or "witty [and] wicked", often noted for its shimmer and changing colors (Charvet ties' shimmer "has become so synonymous with the company that we call it the Charvet effect", says a retailer.)

Ties are made from three pieces of silk material cut at a 45-degree angle. They are sewn entirely by hand before being hand folded into shape. Sevenfold ties are available on order. Until the 1960s, nearly all Charvet ties were sevenfold. The company then decided an interlining could bring an improvement, helping protect the shape despite the pulling, and designed a proprietary interlining "which helps the silk keep its resilience and spring, but is not an obstruction when you tie a knot".

The company produced a range of political ties for the 2008 American presidential campaign. (Note: During the same campaign, the Republican party spent $150,000 on dressing Sarah Palin "for the part of vice-president", part of which was used on Charvet ties for her husband Todd.)

During the 1950s, it invented a special style of bow tie, a cross between a batwing and a butterfly, for the Duke of Windsor, now referred to as the "Charvet cut".

The eponymous style n° 30 of the book on the 188 styles of tie knots (Note: Despite its name, this book does not present an exhaustive list of all possible tie knots, which have been demonstrated to be only 85, but also refers to bow ties, scarves and squares.) is a three layered bow-tie worn by a woman, the constitutive ribbons being stitched together behind the neck.

== Literary allusions and brand image ==
Sebastian entered – dove-grey flannel, white crêpe-de-Chine shirt, a Charvet tie, my tie as it happened, a pattern of postage stamps.

— Evelyn Waugh

References to Charvet in modern British or North American fiction illustrate the brand's identity: they help describe socially a character by its external appearance, such as elegance, nobility, wealth or occupation. Examples of Charvet's "brand emotion" are literary allusions where the reference to the brand denotes a character's taste or some of his psychological traits such as cheerfulness, detachment, eccentricity, decadence or mischief.

== Clients ==
Modern customers include French presidents François Mitterrand and Jacques Chirac, American presidents John F. Kennedy (Note: Kennedy wore linen handkerchieves from Charvet and had the labels of his Charvet shirts removed, in order to avoid evocation of an upper-class attitude. One of his Charvet made shirts is exhibited in the Checkpoint Charlie museum.) and Ronald Reagan, French actors Catherine Deneuve and Philippe Noiret, American movie stars Sofia Coppola and Bruce Willis, fashion designers Yves Saint Laurent and Jasper Conran. (See also: List of Charvet customers.).

For various reasons, some customers, such as Charles Haughey or Bernard-Henri Lévy, "became synonymous with Charvet".
