= Charvet (fabric) =

Warp-faced woven fabric

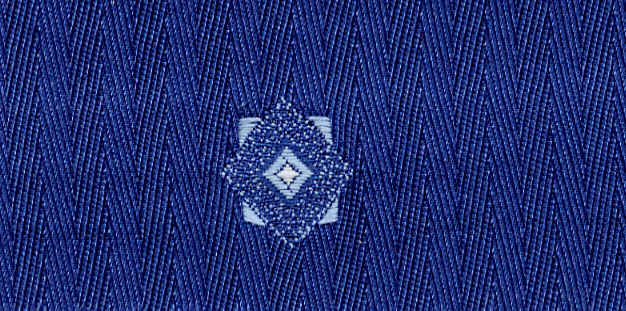
- Charvet ground with supplementary weft pattern
- Material type: Fabric

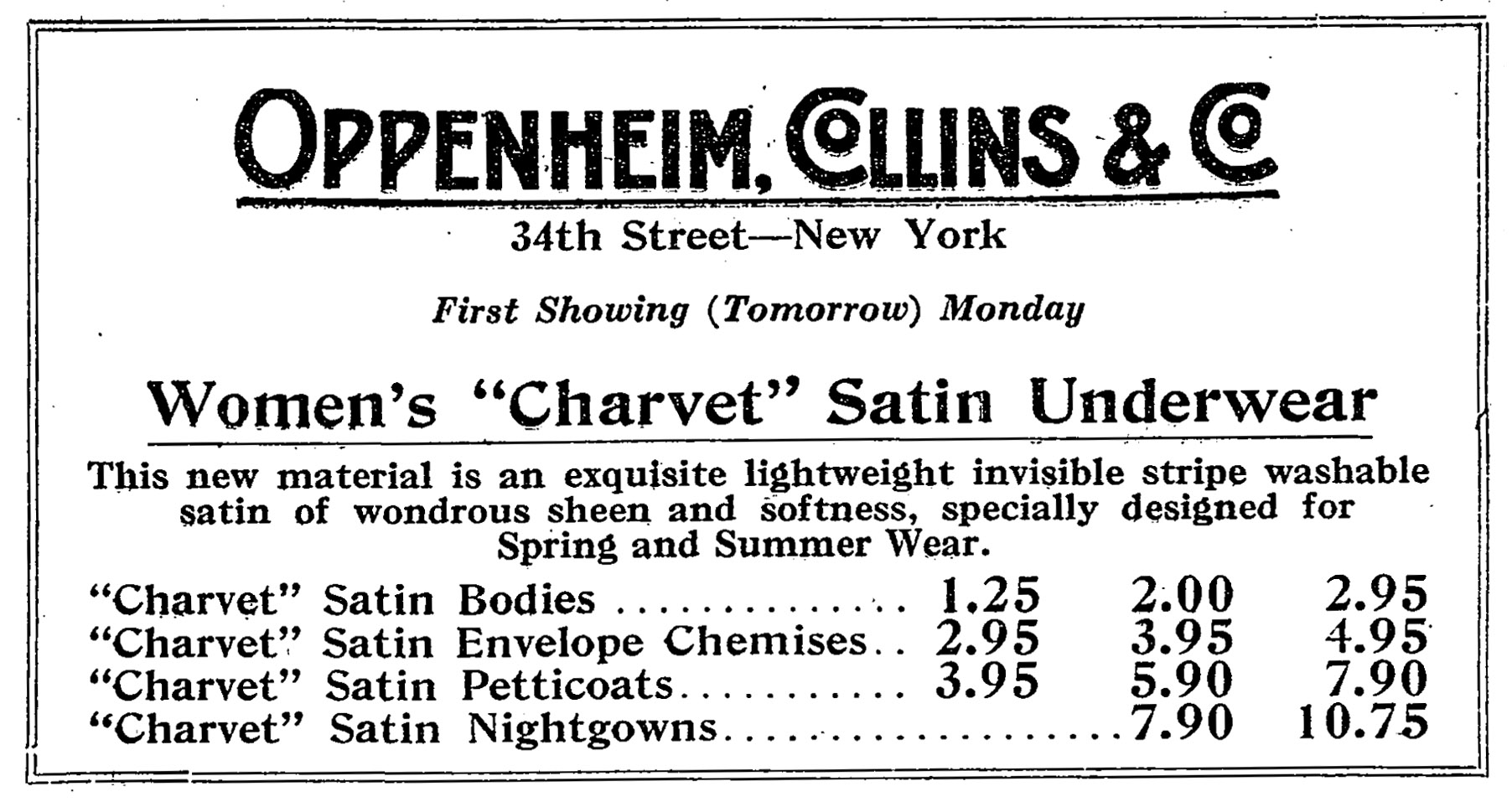
Advertisement (1916). Creative use of the term

A charvet (French: [ʃaʁvɛ]) fabric is woven of silk or acetate in warp-faced rib weave, of a reversed reps type with a double ridge effect. The fabric's name derives from its frequent and "clever" use in the 19th century by the Parisian shirtmaker Charvet. It is characterized by a soft handle and shiny appearance. It also drapes well. The bindings create a herringbone effect parallel to the warp, which make this weave suitable for creating faint diagonal stripe effects for ties, for which the fabric is cut on the bias. Patterns on this base are often made with supplementary weft. The fabric has also been used for mufflers, scarves and robes.

This weave is based on the Régence weave, a kind of reps with all weft raised on the backside, which was popular during the regency of Philippe II, Duke of Orléans (lasting from 1715 to 1723). In the United States, at the end of the 19th century, the term was used in a broader sense, to describe either fabrics "extremely dainty in construction and effect" or silk shirtings. Since the beginning of the 20th century, the weave is rather found in solid fabrics for semi formal wear.

By extension, the term is also used in knitting for a certain kind of bias striping, going up from left to right.
