= Bernhard Roetzel =

German author (born 1966)

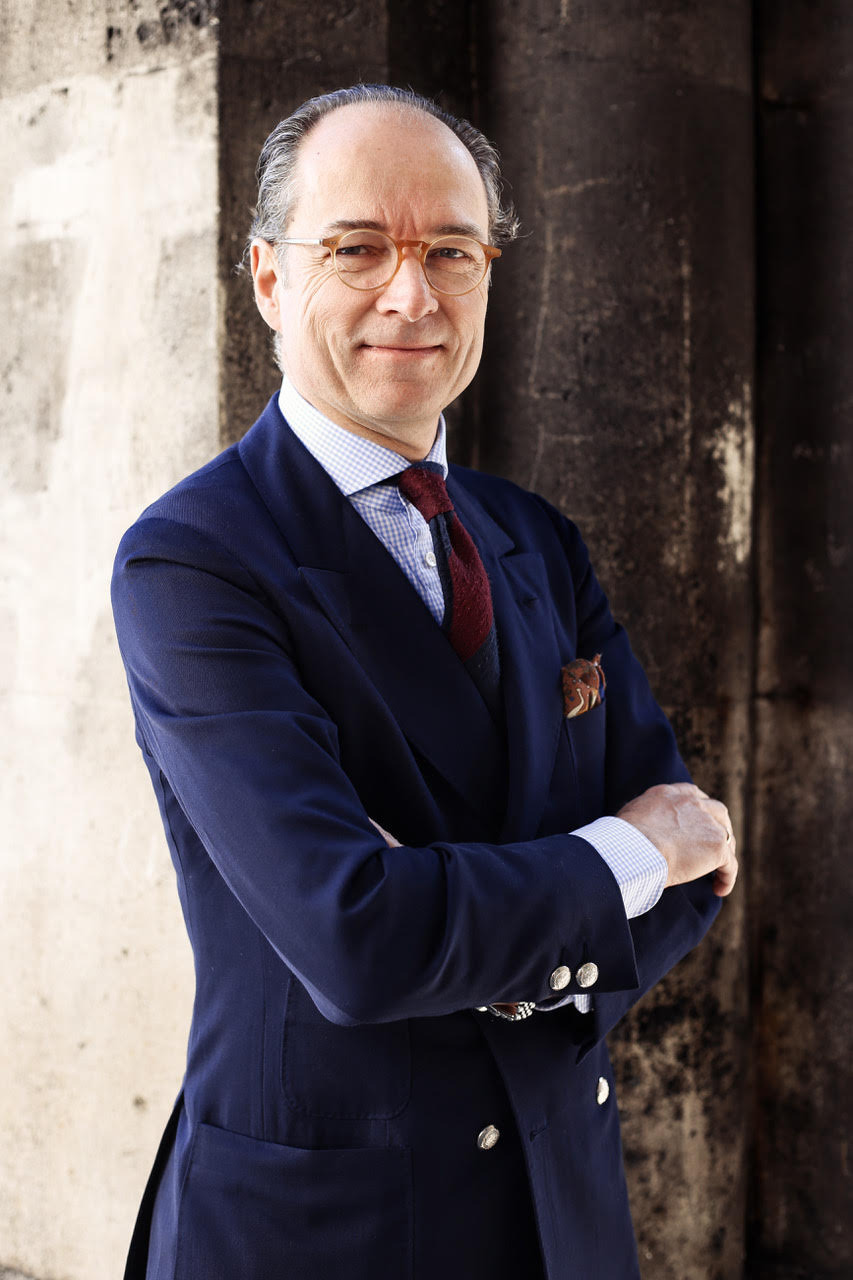
Bernhard Roetzel.

Bernhard Roetzel (born August 17, 1966, in Hannover) is a German author. He is known for writing Gentleman. A Timeless Guide to Fashion.

== Gentleman. A Timeless Guide to Fashion ==
Gentleman. A Timeless Guide to Fashion was first published in German in 1999, by the publishing house Koenemann. The original version of the book has been translated into 19 languages. In 2009, a revised and partly updated edition was published by h. f. ullmann. The new edition has also been translated into several languages.

== Additional publications ==
After the publication of Gentleman. A Timeless Guide to Fashion, Roetzel wrote several other books, which were published in German. In April 2012, his latest book Mode Guide fuer Maenner was published by h. f. ullmann, along with the English version, A Guy's Guide To Style.

Although Roetzel writes primarily about classic menswear, he collaborated with Claudia Piras and the photographer Rupert Tenison on the book British Tradition and Interiors.

Roetzel has been quoted in German newspapers, such as Welt Online, Der Tagesspiegel and Manager Magazin Online, with his opinions on men's fashion. He has appeared on German television several times since 2000 and has been guest in various radio shows all over his country. Outside Germany, he contributes regularly to Alister & Paine Magazine, the Japanese men's fashion magazine Men's Precious and the magazine Bespoken, which is published by the Brussels-based cloth merchant and distributed to its worldwide customers.

== Digital journalism ==
In 2020, Roetzel co-founded the digital menswear magazine Der Feine Herr alongside Tommi Aittala and Martin Smolka. The platform focuses on classic tailoring, artisan workshop reports, and bespoke style guides. He also serves as a regular international contributor to the British classic menswear platform Permanent Style.

== Public speaking ==
Roetzel has spoken at fashion shop openings, sales meetings of menswear companies and conferences of style consultants in Germany, Austria, The Netherlands, Poland, Belgium, France, the UK, the Czech Republic, the US, and Switzerland. In 2000, he spoke at the Annual Lunch of the British Menswear Guild in London.

== Personal background ==
Bernhard Roetzel is the second son of the German scientist Prof. Dr.-Ing. Wilfried Roetzel and his wife Sigrid Roetzel. His great-grandfather was the steel industrialist Christian Rötzel after whom the Christian-Rötzel-Allee in the German town of Breyell was named and the Christian-Rötzel-Kampfbahn. Roetzel lives in Berlin.

== Published works ==
- Roetzel, Bernhard (1999). Der Gentleman. Handbuch der klassischen Herrenmode, Könemann. ISBN 978-3833110603
- Roetzel, Bernhard; and Piras, Claudia (2000), Traditional Style. Wohnkultur auf den britischen Inseln, Könemann
- Roetzel, Bernhard (2002), Der Style-Guide. Moderatgeber für Männer, Rowohlt Verlag
- Roetzel, Bernhard; and Piras, Claudia (2002), 365 Tipps. Der gute Stil Herren, Dumont monte
- Roetzel, Bernhard; and Piras, Claudia (2002), 365 Tipps. Der gute Stil Damen, Dumont monte
- Roetzel, Bernhard; and Piras, Claudia (2002), Die Lady. Handbuch der klassischen Damenmode, Dumont monte
- Roetzel, Bernhard and Piras, Claudia (2003), Mein wunderbarer Kleiderschrank. Moderatgeber für Frauen, Wunderlich Verlag
- Roetzel, Bernhard (2003), Mann - Benimm Dich!, Rowohlt Verlag
- Roetzel, Bernhard (2004), Der ultimative Männerguide, Rowohlt Verlag
- Roetzel, Bernhard and Piras, Claudia (2006), 500 Style-Tipps für ihn, Rowohlt Verlag
- Roetzel, Bernhard and Piras, Claudia (2006), 500 Style-Tipps für sie, Rowohlt Verlag
- Roetzel, Bernhard (2009), Der Gentleman. Handbuch der klassischen Herrenmode (revised edition), Tandem Verlag
- Roetzel, Bernhard (2012), Mode Guide für Männer, H. F. Ullmann
- Roetzel, Bernhard (2013), Schuh Guide für Männer, H. F. Ullmann
