= Yoke (clothing) =

Pattern piece in a garment

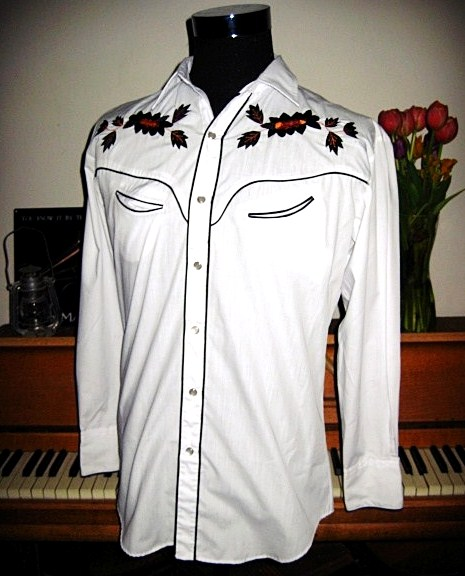
Man's Western wear shirt showing a shoulder yoke with applied decoration.

A yoke is a shaped pattern piece that forms part of a garment, usually fitting around the neck and shoulders or around the hips to provide support for looser parts of the garment, such as a gathered skirt or the body of a shirt. Yoke fabrication was first widely done in the 19th century. Bodice yokes were first made in the 1880s, while the yoke skirt, a skirt suspended from a fitted hip yoke, was first produced in 1898.
