= Short Tails =

- Members of the Short Tail Gang in 1887, under a pier in Corlear's Hook, at the end of Jackson Street the Lower East Side, in New York City. Photographed by noted photographer Jacob Riis, this is one of the rarest images of a group of 19th century New York criminal gang members other than individual police mug shots.
- Founding location: Lower East Side, New York City
- Years active: 1880s–1890s
- Territory: Corlear's Hook, Manhattan, New York City
- Ethnicity: Irish American
- Criminal activities: Armed robbery, theft
- Allies: Eastman Gang
- Rivals: Daybreak Boys, Patsy Conroy Gang, Swamp Angels, Hook Gang

The Short Tails, also known as the Short Tail Gang for their distinctive short-tailed jacket coats, were an 1880s–1890s Irish gang located in the Corlear's Hook section of the Lower East Side, on Rivington Street in the vicinity of Mangin and Goerck Streets of Manhattan, in New York City. The Eastman Gang was also headquartered around Corlear's Hook and may have had its beginnings as a breakaway gang of the Short Tail Gang.

The Short Tails, along with rival gangs the Daybreak Boys, the Patsy Conroy Gang, the Swamp Angels, and the Hook Gang, worked the New York City waterfront, plundering ships of their cargo on the East River. The Short Tail Gang was photographed in 1887, under a pier by noted photographer Jacob Riis, being one of the few 19th-century New York gangs to allow its members to be photographed. In fear of being identified and arrested by the law, usually individual police mug shots were the only criminal pictures known to exist.

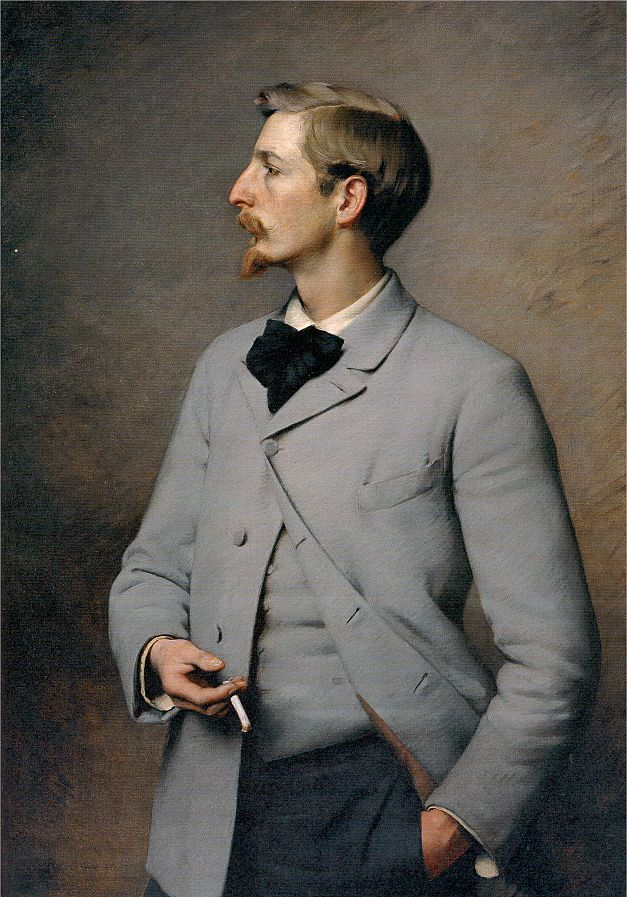
An example of a fashionable short-tailed jacket coat of the kind worn by the gang members of the Short Tails.

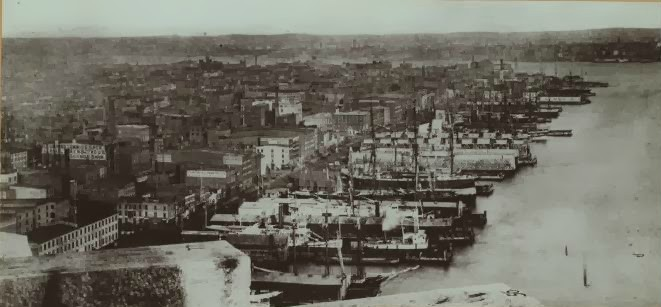
The Short Tails' territory was around Corlear's Hook, Lower East Side, New York City, from the 1880s to 1890s, as shown in a circa 1876 photograph

== In popular culture ==
In the 2014 film Winter's Tale, the Short Tails and the Dead Rabbits gangs are featured prominently, as they are in the 1983 Mark Helprin novel of the same name.
