= Suds Merrick =

- Died: 1884; New York City, New York, U.S.
- Occupation: Criminal
- Known for: New York gang leader and river pirate during the 1860s and 70s; co-led the Hook Gang with Terry Le Strange until 1874.

Suds Merrick (died 1884) was a New York river pirate and member of the Hook Gang during the 1870s. Merrick, along with Tommy Shay, James Coffee and Terry Le Strange, operated in the New York waterfront and involved in burglary and pickpocketing as well as raiding the nearby vessels anchored in the Hudson River. Merrick would co-lead the gang with Le Strange during the early 1870s until the arrest of Sam McCracken, Tommy Bonner, and Johnny Gallagher after they had looted the canal boat Thomas H. Brick and sent to Auburn State Prison in 1874. Following this incident, Merrick turned control of the Hookers to Bum Mahoney although he would remain with the gang in a limited capacity until his death in 1884.
