= Ladew =

Ladew may refer to:

== People ==
- Joseph Harvey Ladew (1867-1940), American leather manufacturer and yachtsman
- Harvey Smith Ladew I (c. 1835-1888), American leather manufacturer and father of Joseph Harvey Ladew and Edward R. Ladew
- Harvey Smith Ladew II (1887-1976), American topiary gardener and son of Edward R. Ladew
- Edward R. Ladew (1855-1905), son of Harvey Smith Ladew I

== Things ==
- Fayerweather & Ladew, an American leather company
- Ladew Topiary Gardens, in Monkton, Maryland, United States
- Ladew's Oldfield mouse (Thomasomys ladewi), a mouse in Bolivia
