= Charles B. Bosley =

American politician and lawyer (died 1959)

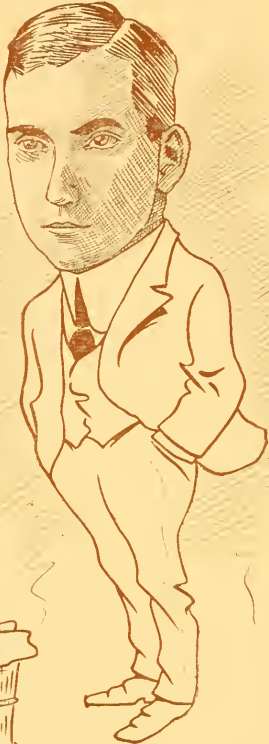
- Caricature of Bosley in 1916 publication

Member of the Maryland House of Delegates from the Baltimore County district
- In office 1914–1914 Serving with B. Wesley Gatch, David G. McIntosh Jr., Henry A. Nagle, Andrew F. Schlee, Newton S. Watts

Personal details
- Born: c. 1888 White Hall, Baltimore County, Maryland, U.S.
- Died: January 22, 1959 (aged 71) Baltimore, Maryland, U.S.
- Resting place: St. James Church; Baltimore County, Maryland, U.S.
- Party: Democratic
- Spouse: Susan Williams Marshall (m. 1934)
- Education: Baltimore City College; University of Maryland School of Law
- Occupation: Politician; lawyer

Charles B. Bosley (c. 1888 – January 22, 1959) was an American politician and lawyer from Maryland. He served as a member of the Maryland House of Delegates, representing Baltimore County in 1914.

== Early life ==
Charles B. Bosley was born at the family's home of Meadowbrook in White Hall in Baltimore County, Maryland, to Mr. and Mrs. William Pearce Bosley. He graduated from Baltimore City College in 1905. He graduated from the University of Maryland School of Law and was admitted to the bar in 1910.

== Career ==
Bosley was a Democrat. He served as a member of the Maryland House of Delegates, representing Baltimore County in 1914. In 1938, Bosley was defeated in election for judge of the Third Judicial Circuit Court.

Bosley was a member of the state industrial accident commission from 1940 to 1942. He was named to the Maryland Public Service Commission in 1942. He served as chairman from 1950 to 1954.

Bosley was a lawyer and was part of the law firm Baldwin & Bosley. He served as counsel and vice president of the Homeseekers' Federal Savings & Loan Association, counsel for the Central State Savings & Loan Association and a director of the White Hall National Bank.

== Personal life ==
Bosley married Susan Williams Marshall on June 16, 1934. Bosley lived at 5 East 39th Street in Baltimore. He was a vestryman of Old St. Paul's Episcopal Church and a member of the Protestant Episcopal Church Mission.

Bosley died on January 22, 1959, at the age of 71, at Johns Hopkins Hospital in Baltimore. He was buried at St. James Church in My Lady's Manor, Baltimore County.
