= Robert C. Hilliard (actor) =

American actor

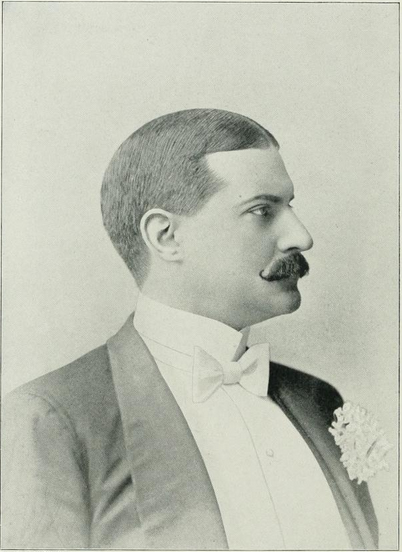
- Hilliard circa 1894
- Born: March 28, 1857; New York
- Died: June 6, 1927 (aged 70); New York
- Occupation: Actor

Robert Cochran Hilliard (May 28, 1857 - June 6, 1927) was an American stage actor. A popular matinee idol of his day, he was nicknamed Handsome Bob.

== Career ==
Hilliard was born in New York City in 1857, and got involved in acting through amateur productions while he was working as a clerk on Wall Street. His professional debut was in the play False Shame in Brooklyn in 1886. He acted in many plays until retiring in 1918. The Oxford Companion to American Theatre states that "although he was a star for many years, most of the plays in which he acted were popular but ephemeral works." He also made frequent appearance in vaudeville between plays.

As his nickname "Handsome Bob" might indicate, Hilliard was known for his attractive looks and for being very well-dressed in the fashions of the day. By 1888, Hilliard was set up as a foil by the press to Evander Berry Wall as to who should be called "King of the Dudes".

== Death ==
Hilliard died of heart disease at his home on West 58th Street in Manhattan on June 6, 1927, and was buried at Green-Wood Cemetery. He was also suffering from diabetes. He was survived by his third wife, Olga Everard Hilliard, and son Robert Bell Hilliard. He was previously married to Cora Bell from 1881 to 1894, and to Nellie B. Whitehouse Murphy, who died in 1913. He married his third wife the following year, though he was her elder by 34 years. He had a son, Robert Bell Hilliard (d. 1928), with his first wife.

He has no known relation to the silent film actor Harry Hilliard though there is a resemblance.

== Selected performances ==
- A Daughter of Ireland (1886)
- Blue Jeans (1890) (role of Perry Bascomb)
- The Pillars of Society (1891) (role of Johann Tonnessen)
- The Girl of the Golden West (1905) (role of Dick Johnson)
- A Fool There Was (1909)(as John Schuyler)
- The Argyle Case (1912) (as Asche Kayton)
