= St. James Church (Monkton, Maryland) =

Historic church in Maryland, United States

- U.S. National Register of Historic Places
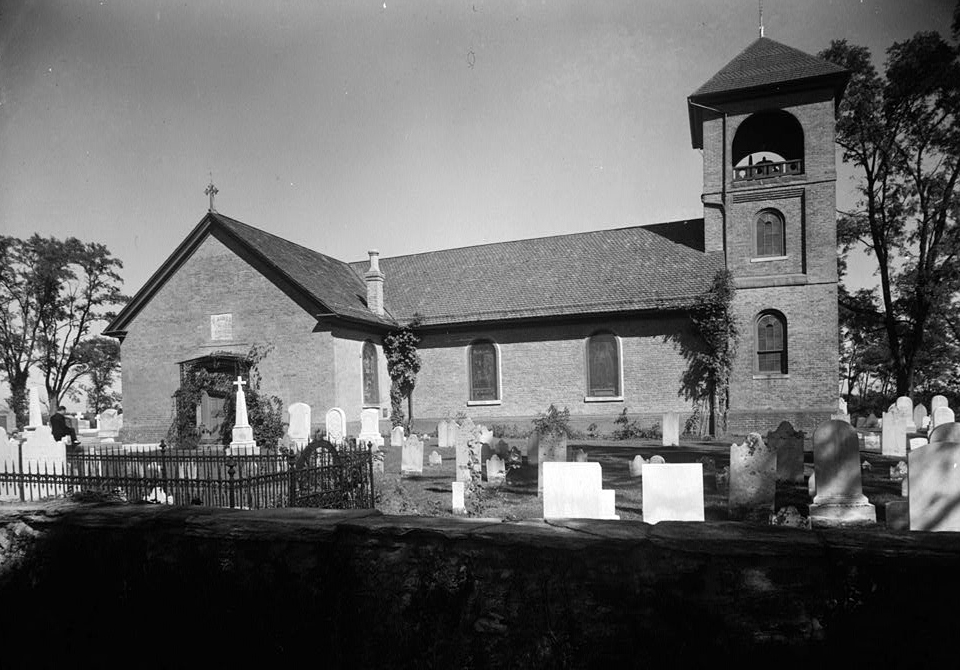

- Location within Maryland Location within the United States
- Location: 3100 Monkton Road, Monkton, Maryland
- Coordinates: 39°33′41″N 76°34′11″W
- Area: less than one acre
- Built: 1755
- Architectural style: Georgian
- NRHP reference No.: 74000941
- Added to NRHP: September 12, 1974

St. James Church is a historic Episcopal church located at Monkton, Baltimore County, Maryland, US.

== History ==
In 1713, Charles Calvert, 3rd Baron Baltimore, gave 10,000 acres to his (fourth) wife Margaret, which ultimately became the My Lady's Manor historic district (in 1978). Settlement intensified later in the 18th century, with the development of the Monkton grist mill along the Gunpowder River. A chapel of ease was constructed, and, clergy from St. John's Parish in Joppa visited periodically.

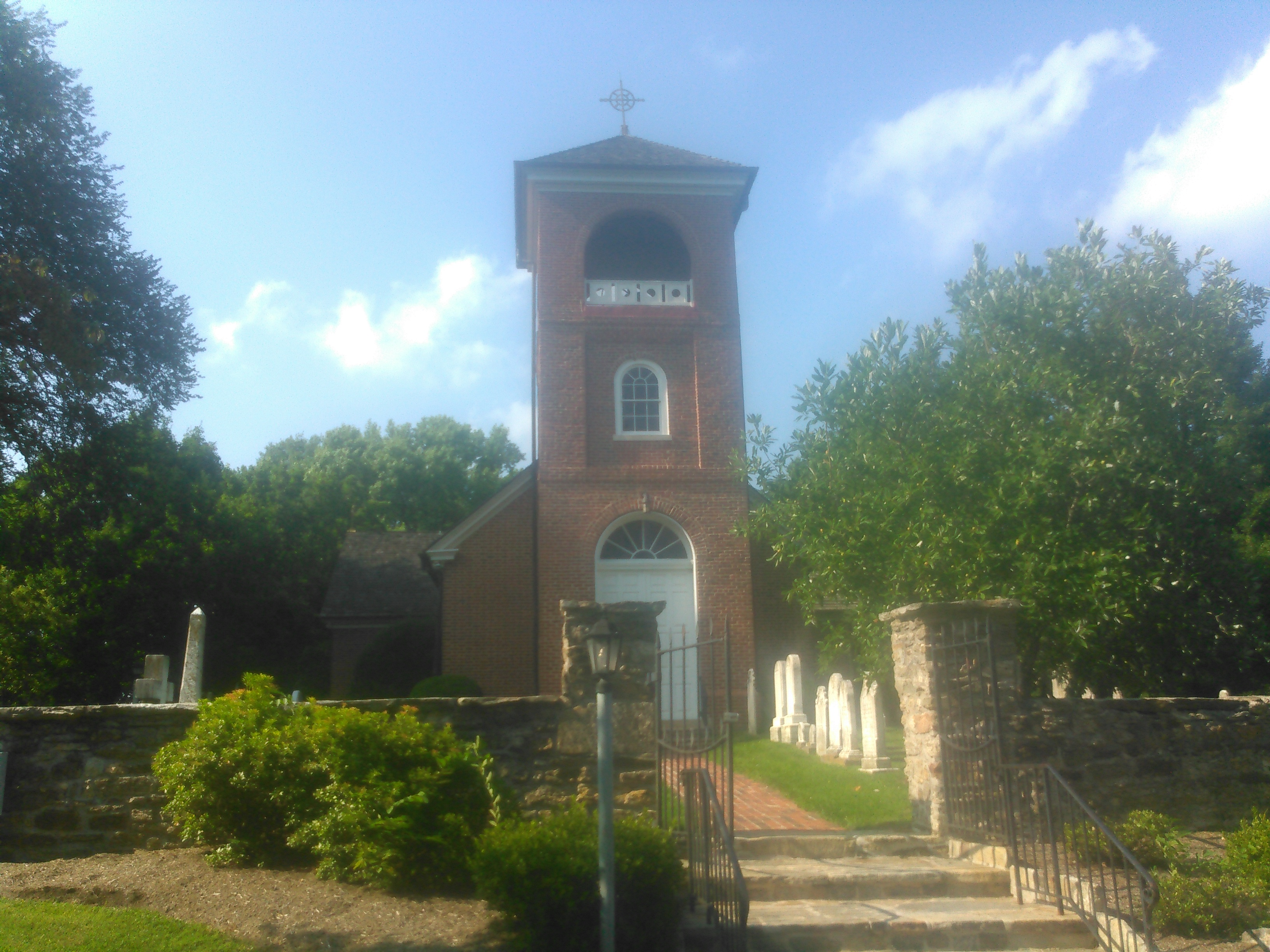
St. James Episcopal Church, Monkton, Maryland

Maryland's legislature recognized St. James as a separate parish from St. John's (also called Copley Parish) in 1770. In 1773, Baltimore and Harford Counties split, with the Gunpowder River becoming the dividing line. Thus, both counties received parts of My Lady's Manor, with the port of Joppatowne securely in Harford County and thriving until silting of the Gunpowder River and development of larger ocean-going vessels made Baltimore the region's major port. The My Lady's Manor land was owned by descendants of scandal-plagued Thomas Brerewood, whose son had married (secretly) the daughter of the fourth Lord Baltimore, who had inherited it in 1731 and soon after emigrated to Maryland with her husband, who developed the land grant. Maryland's legislature confiscated the My Lady's Manor property during the American Revolutionary War and stored gunpowder in the church building (which remained standing). In 1782 the new state of Maryland sold the adjoining lands to tenant farmers, many of whose families still remain in the area. By 1795, the parish had approximately 1600 baptized members.

Monkton Road had been a major north-south route for Native Americans, as well as through the Revolutionary War. However, construction of a road between Baltimore and York, Pennsylvania in 1803, and westward migration inhibited development in this specific area, which remained rural. Still, the nearby town of Monkton became a station on the Baltimore and Susquehanna Railroad, which later merged into the Northern Central Railway and became a division of the Pennsylvania Railroad until the line was abandoned and ultimately converted into a bicycle and walking path, the Northern Central Railroad Trail.

== Architecture ==
Construction of a 60x30 foot brick chapel, a Maryland vernacular interpretation of Georgian ecclesiastical architecture, was initially finished in 1755. Extensions were added in the 18th, 19th and 20th centuries, with the most recent renovation (of the interior, including box pews) completed in 2005. The bell tower dates from 1884. A cemetery surrounds the church, enclosed by a stone wall.

A school was constructed adjacent to the church in 1821, but its buildings physically dismantled in 1884 and the bricks reused in the new bell tower. The parish hall was built in 1904 and expanded in 1950, and the St. James Academy refounded in 1957, with a major refurbishment in 1994-1999. That 89 acre property includes playing fields and a parking lot on the side furthest from Monkton Road.

The church was listed on the National Register of Historic Places in 1974.

== Notable burials ==
- Charles B. Bosley (died 1959), Maryland state delegate and lawyer

== See also ==
- List of post 1692 Anglican parishes in the Province of Maryland
