= List of Charvet customers =

Charvet Place Vendôme or simply Charvet is a French high-end bespoke and ready-to-wear shirtmaker, located at 28 Place Vendôme in Paris. Its list of customers is notable for its time span, Charvet existing since 1838 and having been the first shirt store ever, and as a paradigm of an international "aristo-dandy crossover community". In the 19th century, the shirtmaker both specialized in "royal haberdashery" and attracted the patronage of artists. (Note: According to Robert de Montesquiou, "nobody in the world ever saw such things! Pinks, blues, lilacs, in silk, and in cobweb! Charvet is the greatest artist in the Creation". Jean Cocteau called Charvet "magic" and wrote that it is "where the rainbow finds ideas". According to the French historian Anne Martin-Fugier, referring to Balzac's notion of the "triple aristocracy of money, power and talent", the participation of artists was characteristic of the lifestyle of the Parisian fashionable upper class: "their works proceed of their person, bear its mark and testify of its value as the walk, the style, the luxury of the furnishing proceeds of the person of the man of quality".) In the 20th century, with the development of fashion design, designers and fashion journalists became a significant customer group. Some other customers' interest in the brand has become a notable aspect of their personality. In keeping with a tradition of discretion of French couture houses, (Note: At the end of the 19th century Édouard Charvet made a point of never greeting first a lady customer in the street.) the company declines to comment on its customers list, as a service to its customers.

== Kings, princes, heads of state and heads of government ==
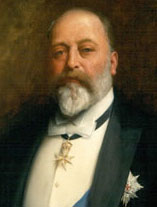
Portrait (1905) of King Edward VII by Luke Fildes, Royal College of Physicians

Name, surname	Nationality	Occupation	Born
Abdul Hamid II (Note: Abdul Hamid II, though he advocated "simplicity" in every day clothing, was a "sumptuous" customer of Charvet suits. He ordered some 40 costumes a year and trusted the taste of Charvet for the selection of the cloth. Charvet "barely dared" send invoices to the sultan.^{,} A white monogrammed waistcoat made for him by Charvet is on display at the Topkapı Palace.)	Turkish	Sultan	1842
Alfonso XII of Spain (Note: Warrant of Proveedor de la Real Casa granted in 1878.)	Spanish	King	1857
Alfonso XIII of Spain (Note: Warrant of Proveedor de la Real Casa granted in 1913.)	Spanish	King	1886
Antoine, Duke of Montpensier (Note: Warrant of Proveedor de la Real Casa granted in 1879.)	French	Prince	1824
Barre, Raymond	French	Prime minister	1924
Carter, Jimmy	American	President	1924
Charles III of the United Kingdom	British	King	1948
Chirac, Jacques	French	President	1932
Churchill, Winston	British	Prime minister	1874
de Gaulle, Charles	French	President	1890
Deschanel, Paul	French	President	1855
Edward VII of the United Kingdom (Note: In 1869, Charvet was granted a royal warrant of "chemisier in Paris" (shirtmaker in Paris) to the prince of Wales and would remain his shirt maker into the 20th century, appointed in 1903 "hosier and glover in Paris". As Edward VII was considered an "arbiter of masculine fashions" and looked upon "as the glass of fashion for his day", this patronage contributed significantly to the notoriety of Charvet: an 1874 guide advised American tourists Charvet shirts were one of Paris specialties, "stamped with high approval by the patronage of the Prince of Wales". The patronage stirred polemics in the United Kingdom, as the prince was "accused of not sufficiently encouraging home industries and of purchasing annually hundreds of pairs of gloves on the continent".)	English	King	1841
Edward VIII of the United Kingdom	English	Prince	1894
Farouk of Egypt	Egyptian	King	1920
Grimaldi, Stéphanie	Monegasque	Princess	1965
Haughey, Charles (Note: The shirtmaker achieved significant – and sometimes exaggerated – coverage in Irish media when it emerged that former Taoiseach Charles Haughey, then after nicknamed "Charvet Charlie", had misappropriated over $50,000 of state funds while in office to purchase shirts and dressing gowns from Charvet, where the staff addressed him as "your excellency", and had them delivered via the diplomatic "black box" system, at a time when he was exhorting Irish citizens to "tighten their belts". This was described by Mr Haughey himself as "having gone into the folklore" and resulted in a surge of Irish visitors at the Paris store. According to The Boston Globe, conspicuous Irish visitors to the Charvet shop "pose for photographs outside the venerable shop, and sometimes venture inside to gawk at the crystal chandeliers, the oak paneling, the Oriental rugs and the cuff links in bowls scattered around the shop. And they pose indelicate questions about their former prime minister". When Sebastian Barry's Hinterland, a play on Haughey, was first played in 2002, the Sunday Tribune reviewer asked: "Is this a Charvet shirt I see before me?")	Irish	Prime minister	1925
Ali Jinnah, Muhamad	Pakistani	Governor-General	1876
Kennedy, John F. (Note: Kennedy wore custom-made shirts from Charvet but kept their origin a secret. He had the labels of his Charvet shirts removed. A Charvet shirt having belonged to Kennedy is on display at Berlin's Checkpoint Charlie Museum.)	American	President	1917
Mitterrand, François	French	President	1916
de Morny, Mathilde	French	Princess	1863
Moro, Aldo	Italian	Prime minister	1916
Nicholas I of Montenegro	Montenegrin	King	1841
Obama, Barack	American	President	1961
Pavlos of Greece	Greek	Prince	1967
Pavlovich, Dmitri	Russian	Grand Duke	1891
Singh, Bhupinder (Note: The maharaja once placed a single order of 86 dozen shirts. Charvet had to construct special trunks to ship them to him. Each item was embroidered with his crest. The bill for the monogramming alone was $ 67,000.)	Indian	Maharajah	1891
Philippe, comte de Paris (Note: Warrant granted in 1893.)	French	Prince	1838
Pompidou, Georges	French	President	1911
Reagan, Ronald	American	President	1911
Sarkozy, Nicolas	French	President	1955
Truman, Harry	American	President	1884

== Writers, artists and actors ==
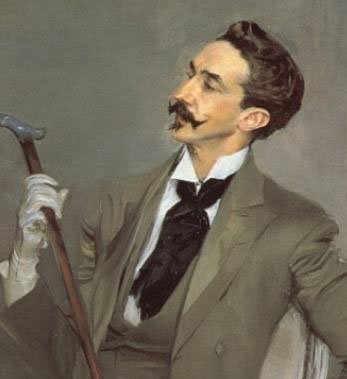
Portrait (1897) by Boldini of Montesquiou in a Charvet shirt and tie, Musée d'Orsay

Name, surname	Nationality	Occupation	Born
Acton, Harold	British	Writer	1904
Adorf, Mario	German	Actor	1930
Astaire, Fred	American	Actor	1899
Avedon, Richard	American	Photographer	1923
Baer, Édouard	French	Actor	1966
Baudelaire, Charles	French	Poet	1821
Barton, Ralph (Note: Barton's haberdashery came from Charvet's, Place Vendôme, and embraced "a varied assortment of colored striped shirts, with drawers and collars of the same material to match each shirt, white silk undershirts, beige silk pajamas (emblazoned with white frogs), and white, watered-silk suspenders. Each of his pairs of trousers ha[d] its own pair of suspenders". "In Paris he began to affect Charvet cravats encircled with a scarab seal ring.")	American	Painter	1891
Beaton, Cecil	English	Photographer	1904
Edwards Bello, Joaquín	Chilean	Writer	1887
Bergen, Candice	American	Actress	1946
Berlioz, Hector	French	Composer	1803
Betjeman, John	British	Writer	1906
Birkin, Jane	British	Actress	1946
Bloom, Allan	American	Writer	1930
Bourget, Paul	French	Writer	1852
Brynner, Yul	Russian	Actor	1920
Broun, Heywood	American	Journalist	1888
Bywater, Michael	British	Writer	1953
Cambaceres, Eugenio	Argentinian	Writer	1843
Cocteau, Jean	French	Writer	1889
Cooper, Gary	American	Actor	1901
Condo, George	American	Visual artist	1957
Coppola, Francis Ford	American	Film director	1939
Coppola, Roman	American	Film director	1965
Coppola, Sofia	American	Film director	1971
Coward, Noël	British	Actor	1899
Crosby, Bing	American	Singer	1903
Crowley, Aleister	British	Writer	1875
Dano, Paul	American	Actor	1984
Debussy, Claude	French	Composer	1862
Denby, Edwin	American	Writer	1903
Deneuve, Catherine	French	Actress	1943
Diaghilev, Sergei	Russian	Ballet impresario	1872
D'Ormesson, Jean	French	Writer	1925
Dujardin, Édouard	French	Writer	1861
Dunaway, Faye	American	Actress	1941
Duras, Marguerite	French	Writer	1914
Eiffel, Gustave	French	Architect	1832
Feig, Paul	American	Director	1962
Fairbanks, Douglas	American	Actor	1883
Fargue, Léon-Paul	French	Writer	1876
Ferry, Bryan	English	Singer	1945
Février, Jacques	French	Pianist	1900
Firbank, Ronald	British	Writer	1886
Follett, Ken	English	Writer	1949
Gainsbourg, Serge	French	Singer	1928
Gary, Romain (Note: The French writer wore a red silken Charvet dressing gown when he committed suicide, to ensure blood did not show too much.)	French	Writer	1914
Gernsback, Hugo	American	Writer	1884
Grant White, Richard	American	Writer	1822
Guinness, Daphne	British	Actress	1967
Guitry, Sacha (Note: Charvet created for Guitry a double button turned-down cuff often referred to as the "milanese" cuff.)	French	Actor	1885
Hébertot, Jacques	French	producer	1886
Hemingway, Ernest	American	Writer	1899
Hergesheimer, Joseph	American	Writer	1880
Hockney, David	British	Painter	1937
Horowitz, Vladimir	American	Pianist	1903
Howard, Brian	British	poet	1905
Kelly, Kevin	American	editor	1952
Irons, Jeremy	English	Actor	1948
Kaufman, George S.	American	Writer	1889
Larbaud, Valery	French	Writer	1881
Lawrence, Jennifer	American	Actress	1990
Le Bargy, Charles	French	Actor	1858
Lebowitz, Fran	American	Writer	1950
Leigh Fermor, Patrick	British	Writer	1915
Le Luron, Thierry	French	Humorist	1952
Lennon, Sean	American	Musician	1975
Lévy, Bernard-Henry (Note: Bernard-Henri Lévy, often referred to as BHL, is described as a "provocateur", a "showman", who "wears the mantle of polarizing intellectual quite happily along with made-to-measure clothing from French house Charvet". His shirt style has become a signature, but he says he "has no interest discussing the suavely unbuttoned garment that for his fans and his detractors alike has become synonymous with his name." Nevertheless, his critics consider this unbuttoned white shirt "is an important element of BHL's TV and public images and it tells a lot about the man. If you tried it with your own shirt, the collar would sag. But BHL's shirts are specially designed by the famous shirt-maker Charvet, with collars that withstand the unbuttoning and never disappear under his jacket", also made by Charvet.)	French	Writer	1948
Luchini, Fabrice	French	Actor	1951
Manet, Édouard	French	Painter	1832
Marcosson, Isaac Frederick	American	editor	1877
Matisse, Henri	French	Painter	1869
Mayle, Peter	British	Writer	1939
Menjou, Adolphe (Note: Menjou had the reputation to be Hollywood's "best dressed man" and lived up to it by coming onto the set each day with Charvet dressing gowns.)	American	Actor	1890
Modiano, Patrick	French	Writer	1945
Monet, Claude	French	Painter	1840
Montesquiou, Robert de (Note: In a letter to Montesquiou, Marcel Proust alludes to a caricature by Sem of Montesquiou examining fabrics at Charvet.)	French	Poet	1855
Morand, Paul	French	Writer	1888
Noiret, Philippe	French	Actor	1930
Niemeyer, Oscar	Brazilian	Architect	1907
Offenbach, Jacques	French	Composer	1819
Pidgeon, Walter	Canadian	Actor	1897
Proust, Marcel (Note: "His shirts and waistcoasts were from Charvet, he told me. What interested him in Charvet was the sign of a certain world, of a certain elegance")	French	Writer	1871
Radiguet, Raymond	French	Writer	1905
Reverdy, Pierre	French	Writer	1889
Richman, Harry	American	Actor	1895
Rostand, Edmond	French	Writer	1868
Rostand, Maurice	French	Writer	1891
Runyon, Damon	American	Writer	1880
Sand, George	French	Writer	1804
Schofield, Leo	Australian	Critic	1935
Saraiva, André	French	Graffiti artist	1971
Simenon, Georges	Belgian	Writer	1903
Sitwell, Osbert	English	Writer	1892
Stein, Gertrude	American	Writer	1874
Thomson, Virgil	American	Composer	1896
de Tocqueville, Alexis	French	Writer	1805
Thurman, Uma	American	Actress	1970
Van Vechten, Carl	American	Photographer	1880
Waugh, Evelyn	English	Writer	1903
Welles, Orson	American	Film director	1915
White, Stanford	American	Architect	1853
Wilde, Oscar	Irish	Writer	1854
Wilder, Billy	American	Film director	1906
Willis, Bruce	American	Actor	1955
Wolfe, Tom	American	Writer	1931
Wright, Frank Lloyd	American	Architect	1867
Zola, Émile	French	Writer	1840

== Designers and fashion specialists ==
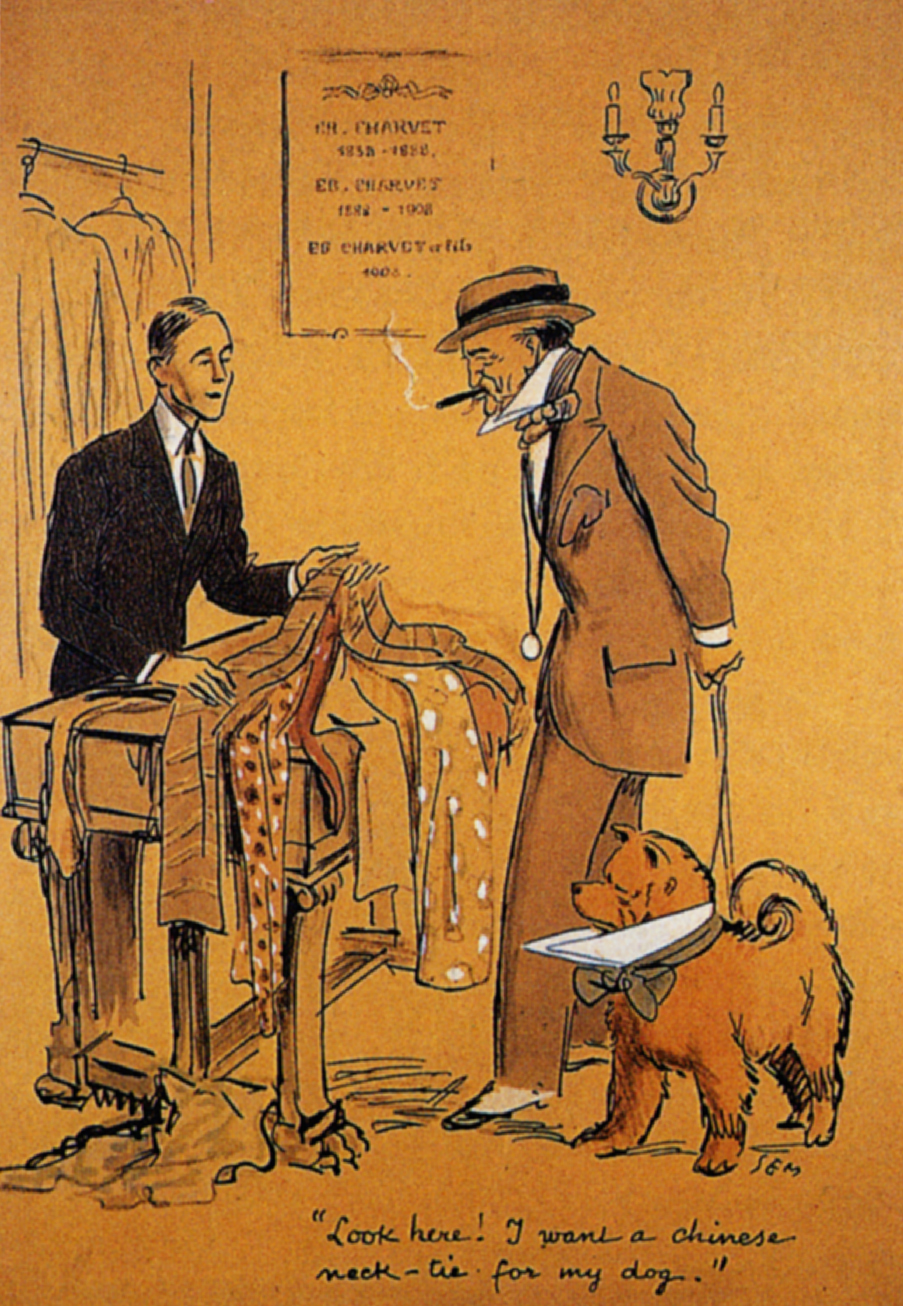
Caricature (1920s) by Sem of Berry Wall at Charvet

Name, surname	Nationality	Occupation	Born
Altuzarra, Joseph	French	Designer	1985
Baron, Fabien (Note: Asked by a reporter of Fashion Week Daily: "Do you have a uniform?". He answered: "Black cashmere sweater, Charvet shirt, Levi's, and Converse All Stars." "He has bought his dress shirts at Charvet in Paris for the last 15 years", wrote the New York Times in 2004.)	French	Editor	1959
Bastian, Michael	American	Fashion designer	1965
Blahnik, Manolo	Spanish	Designer	1942
Boateng, Ozwald	British	Designer	1967
Bowles, Hamish	British	Editor	1963
Campbell, Thomas P.	American	Museum director	1962
Cardin, Pierre	French	Designer	1922
de Castelbajac, Jean-Charles	French	designer	1949
Chanel, Coco (Note: She used Charvet ties as belts for herself and as a ballet costume designer)	French	Designer	1883
Conran, Jasper	English	Designer	1959
Dello Russo, Anna	Italian	Editor at large	1962
Elkann, Lapo	Italian	Entrepreneur	1977
Ettedgui, Joseph	British	Fashion retailer	1936
Evins David	American	Shoe designer	1909
Fekkai, Frédéric	French	Hairdresser	1958
Galanos, James	American	Designer	1924
Galliano, John	English	Designer	1960
Kors, Michael	American	Designer	1959
Lagerfeld, Karl	German	Designer	1933
Louboutin, Christian (Note: Louboutin wears Charvet shirts and collects Charvet ties, which he owns in hundreds and considers "the most treasured part" of his wardrobe and a "constant source of inspirations:" If I go shopping, it might be to buy two or three more ties, which I never wear, or shirts from Charvet on Place Vendôme. Here they have the most magnificent colored ties: it's like looking at a lovely garden. I have tons of them at home and I am perfectly happy not to wear them." One of his line of lady shoes had "witty, wicked designs made of Charvet tie fabric".)	French	Designer	1963
Monteil Germaine	French	Designer	1898
Moss, Kate	English	Model	1974
Mugler, Thierry	French	Designer	1948
O'Brien, Glenn	American	Editor	
Ossendrijver, Lucas	Dutch	Artistic director	1971
Perriand, Charlotte	French	Designer	1903
Picasso, Paloma	French	Designer	1949
Posen, Zac	American	Designer	1980
Roitfeld, Carine	French	Editor-in-Chief	1954
Rucci, Ralph (Note: A "crisp white Charvet shirt, made to his own specifications by the famed Paris menswear store" is Rucci's "signature". His fabric of choice is "the "heavy, white piqué" that he replenishes three times a year. There is a tradition of care [at Charvet] that the want to be perfect. It is really couture for men" declares Rucci [... He] estimates that he now owns at least 110 of the shirts that have become his trademark, every last one in white piqué with "two lowercase Rs embroidered in cinnabar [his signature color] at the base of the neck [...] I must have tried 25 other fabrics but I always end up giving them away [...] My white piqué shirts empowers me.")	American	Designer	1957
Saint Laurent, Yves	French	Designer	1936
Sánchez, Fernando	Spanish	Fashion designer	1935
Sarafpour, Behnaz	American	Designer	
Takada, Kenzo	Japanese	Designer	1939
Taschen, Benedikt	German	Art publisher	1961
Talley, André Leon (Note: Talley wears "tie[s] and socks [...] from Charvet of Paris, the same couturier that used to make – along with the Duke of Windsor's shirts – [his] boxer shorts, until that became "cost prohibitive". He is also keen about Charvet shirts:"I have a wonderful white cotton shirt. I always love white cotton shirts. Pique collar and cuffs, from Paris. It wasn't imported from Paris; I went to Paris and had it fitted. I had fittings. I have fittings for my neckties. My neckties from Charvet. You have to have fittings for your tie ... so it's the right length. My socks are from Charvet. I don't have fittings for those". He explains: "I admire perfection in small details. Look at these cuffs. (He holds his shirt under [a journalist's] eyes) Look at the stitches on the piqué. Where can this be done today? Only Charvet in Paris, Place Vendôme. All my shirts are custom made at Charvet." In a January issue of Vogue, he wrote his New Year's fashion resolution was "to order custom Charvet pique tennis shorts and silk kneesocks the color of clotted cream". In a sequence of the movie The September Issue, he says: "I have these custom nightshirts made at Charvet in Paris. I only wear them when I am at Mr. Karl Laggerfield's summer house vacationing. For if you pass Mr. Karl Laggerfield in the hallway, you must be appropriately attired at all times!".)	American	Editor	1949
Testino, Mario	Peruvian	Photographer	1954
Tisci, Riccardo	Italian	Designer	1974
Tonchi, Stefano	American	Editor	1959
Touhami, Ramdane	French	Designer	1974
von Fürstenberg, Diane	German	Fashion designer	1946
Wall, Berry (Note: Berry Wall, nicknamed the "King of the Dudes, added to Charvet's fame by the caricatures of him produced by Sem. At that time, Wall was living with his wife and chow dog Chi-Chi in the Hôtel Meurice, near Charvet, where he had the same signature ties and "spread eagle" collar shirts made for himself and his dog. Wall's famous "startling" striped shirts in red and sky blue were well known, with their very high false collars of a pattern different from the shirt's. His dog not only dined with him, but also wore Charvet collars and ties in the same style and fabric as his master's. The caricature shown had so much success that the Paris restaurant Ciro's, where Wall was a regular patron, had a reproduction of the dog made, in stuffed fabric, with his master's false collar around the neck, to be offered to guests. The caricature (top, right) is reproduced in François Chaille's Book of Ties, but Chaille fails to identify Wall.)	American	Socialite	1860
Wolff, Michael	American	Journalist	1953
York, Peter	British	Columnist	

== Other clients with a notable interest in Charvet ==
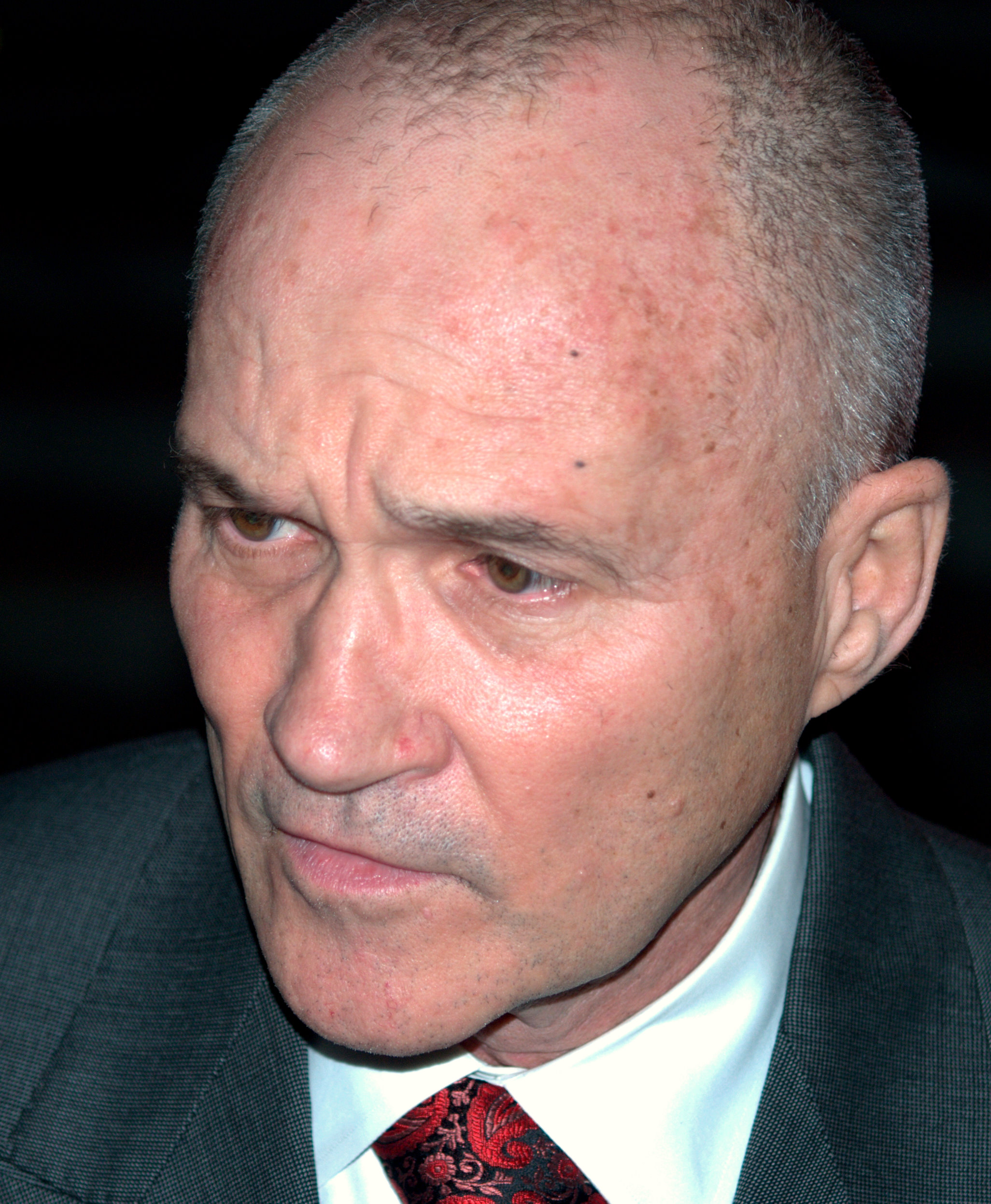
Photo (2009) of Ray Kelly wearing a Charvet tie reproduced in Chaille's Book of Ties.

Name, surname	Nationality	Occupation	Born
Bigelow, William Sturgis (Note: "At once an epicure and a mystic, [Bigelow] professed an ascetic religion and wore beautiful Charvet haberdashery", particularly neckties and silk shirts. Charvet "disapprove[d] of the silk shirts, the use of which, he allege[d], [was] confined to Mr James Hazen Hyde and a few bounders of his class. Yet, to please [him], Mr Charvet kindly consent[ed] to make [him] a pattern silk shirt, provided he [could] accompany it by a pattern linen pleated shirt, to be made up starchless, like a handkerchief.".)	American	Doctor	1850
Blagojevich, Rod (Note: According to a Chicago Tribune journalist: "Historians should note that, although Blagojevich has made much of his humble beginnings, his elegant pearl-gray [is from] Charvet [...] he now buys only Charvet." Charvet is noted as his "preferred [tie] brand". During his federal trial, court records established that he bought at Neiman Marcus at least two of those ties there, paying $170 for one in 2007 and $195 for the other in 2008". A Saks associate said over the phone that he believed another associate there had sold Charvet ties at $195 to Blagojevich.)	American	Politician	1956
Capel, Arthur "Boy" (Note: In the early 20th century, Charvet launched a toilet water, in a rectangular beveled bottle. One of the customers for this perfume was Boy Capel, Coco Chanel's lover. In 1921, two years after his accidental death, the flacon of Chanel's famous Nº 5 perfume was produced in the image of the Charvet bottle used by Capel.)	English	Businessman	1881
Kelly, Ray (Note: Mr Kelly's ideal style is "bespoke suits and Charvet ties." Often noted for wearing Charvet ties, he admits a "personal weakness for [...] Charvet neckwear", which is "high quality and look[s] the best" and he considers as "some sort of statement". On other occasions, he presented this predilection as part of his business behaviour, saying: "Contrary to what was suggested, if the mayor replaces me, I will not miss wearing my [...] Charvet tie". Mr. Kelly says he "can tell when someone's wearing Charvet from a distance – even dark colors stand out".)	American	Commissioner	1941
Madoff, Bernard (Note: An auction of articles once belonging to Bernard Madoff was organized on November 13, 2010, by the United States Marshals Service to compensate victims of Madoff's Ponzi scheme. The auction included many items from Charvet, such as 138 pairs of socks, 11 boxer shorts, "loads of neckties" and "hundreds of sweaters, polo shirts, and custom-made monogrammed Charvet dress shirts.")	American	Stockbroker	1938
Tang, David (Note: Tang, who likes to wear at home "all days pyjamas – custom made in cotton by Charvet", has Charvet embroider " "Do not disturb DT" or "DT sleeping" on the pocket. [He says] the most luxurious thing is to change your fine Egyptian-cotton pyjamas and sheets each day" and considers Charvet "the best shirtmaker in the world".)	Chinese	Businessman	1954
