= King of the Dudes =

King of the Dudes may refer to:

- Evander Berry Wall (1861–1940), a socialite dubbed "King of the Dudes"
- King of the Dudes, an album by Sunflower Bean
