= United States Leather Company =

American leather manufacturing conglomerate (1893-1952)

The United States Leather Company (1893-1952), was one of the largest corporations in the United States circa 1900, and one of the original companies in the Dow Jones Industrial Average. It was often referred to by contemporary sources as the "Leather combine" or "Leather trust".

== History ==
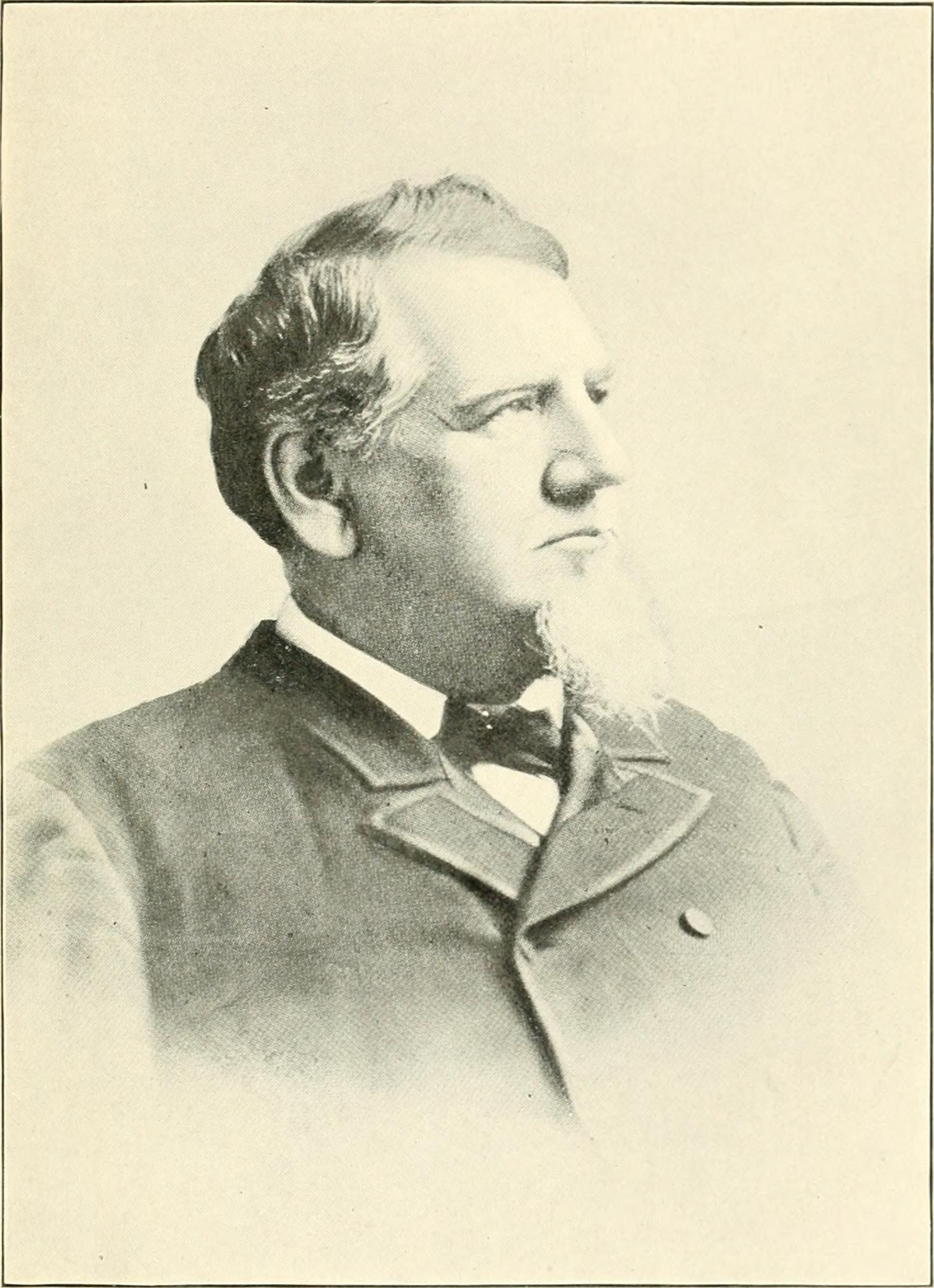
Hon. Mark Hoyt, the second president of the United States Leather Company

The United States Leather Company was originally capitalized at $130 million, approximately equivalent to $3.1 billion in 2009 dollars. The company was specifically concerned with "hemlock sole leather", which was made via a process that required extracts from large quantities of hemlock bark. It required two and a half cords of wood to provide tannin for 100 hides. According to the Boston Globe, the combine obtained "a proprietorship of 75% of the bark property." In assessing the importance of the combine, the Globe noted that "all red leather is hemlock leather, and oak tan is used only on union leather, which cuts a very inconsiderable figure beside the hemlock-tanned product." Thus, the company "will have a pretty substantial hold on the leather industry of this country."

The company was headquartered in New York City, with strong ties to Boston (then an important leather center). The first president was Thomas E. Proctor of Boston, and initial financing was by New York and Boston firms. Edward R. Ladew was the first vice president.

The formation of the company was seen as a reaction to problems in the tanning industry, and as a competitive move against the Chicago meat-packing interests.

In 1905, efforts began to reorganize the United States Leather Company as a subsidiary of the Central Leather Company. The merger was held up by several New Jersey court injunctions. On September 24, 1909, the shareholders of the companies voted in favor of the merger, meeting the court's objections and completing the merger.

In 1927, another reorganization merged the Central Leather Company into its subsidiary, and the reorganized company again took the name "United States Leather Company."

By the early 1950s, the great majority of the timber lands in Pennsylvania and New York had been sold to large hunting clubs and State land agencies. In some of these transactions, where the oil, gas & mineral rights had not already been reserved, USLC reserved these rights to itself.

In 1952, the company was liquidated, the only company of the original twelve in the Dow Jones Industrial Average to do so (as of 2007). Its headquarters building, then at 27-29 Spruce Street in New York, was sold. The first distribution to shareholders, $10/share, was made on January 31, 1952. Any remaining oil and gas interests were quitclaimed to its wholly owned subsidiary, Keta Gas & Oil Corporation. Shareholders of the United States Leather Company were granted one share in Keta for every share they held in USLC.

== Keta Gas & Oil Corporation ==
During the early 1950s, Keta acquired leases in several potential natural gas formations in Pennsylvania and drilled several mediocre wells. It continued to hold oil, gas and mineral rights (not reserved by the original grantors) and leases through its subsidiary, Keta Gas and Oil Company through 1955. Acting on a shareholder vote to liquidate its assets, Keta's directors valued its 114,000 acres worth of fee rights and leasehold interests at $1/acre and sold the company to Swan-Finch in 1955. Shareholders received one share in Swan-Finch for every share of Keta and were granted a pro-rata underlying royalty of 40% in certain fee properties held in Lycoming County.

The infamous Lowell Birrell acquired Swan-Finch and used Keta's paper assets to confuse the balance sheets of his other companies in what was considered one of the greatest stock manipulations of the 20th Century.

The Original 52,636 Fee OGM Acres Owned by USLC and Held by Keta Were as Follows:

Cameron County (Lumber) - 55 Acres

Cameron/McKean Counties (Wharton) - 3,500 Acres

Potter/Tioga/Warren (Ulysees) - 25,854 Acres

Tioga (Sabinsville) - 374 Acres

Tioga (Westfield) - 825 Acres

Lycoming (Pine, Jackson and Cogan House) 7,450 Acres

Lycoming (Brown and Pine) 1,042 Acres

Lycoming (Cascade) 11,287 Acres (3/4 Interest)

Lycoming (Anthony) 1,280 Acres

Sullivan (Forks) 779 Acres

Bradford (Towanda) 190 Acres

== Original grantors ==
The following tanning operators and corporations contributed their lands and bark rights to the United States Leather Company. Many reserved the oil, gas and mineral rights underlying the contributed lands for themselves and their heirs and continue to control these properties to the present day.

- Thomas E. Proctor
- N. W. Rice & Co.
- Horton, Crary & Co.
- Fayerweather & Ladew
- Hoyt Brothers
- H. G. Lapham & Co.
- P.C. Costello & Co.
- A. Heely & Sons
- James Horton & Co.
