= Dennis Jones (musician) =

- Born: 1958 (age 67–68); Monkton, Maryland, United States
- Genres: Blues rock
- Occupations: Singer, guitarist, songwriter
- Instruments: Vocals, guitar
- Years active: 1980s–present
- Label: Blue Rock Records
- Website: http://www.dennisjonescentral.com

Dennis Jones (born 1958) is an American blues rock singer, guitarist, and songwriter. He has released eight albums since 2003. Jones has opened for shows by Johnny Winter, Buddy Guy and Dick Dale.

== Life and career ==
He was born in Monkton, Maryland, United States. Inspired by his parents' record collection which included recordings by B.B. King and Bobby Bland, Jones asked if he could have a set of drums, but was given a guitar instead when he was 13. While still in his teenage years, Jones played in a number of local bands, and started writing songs. Following his graduation from high school, his parents organized a party at their home and his band performed. By the age of 18, and with a feeling for adventure, Jones join the military, where he was stationed in Germany. He married, relocated back to Baltimore County, before moving on again to Los Angeles. Jones secured a day job and played his music at the weekend, although his marriage fell apart after ten years. Jones formed one of his earliest bands in Los Angeles named Blackhead. When they parted company, Jones decided to attempt heading up a band playing blues rock.

Jones played guitar with Zac Harmon, billed as Zac Harmon & the Mid-South Revue, and played on their live album, Live at Babe and Ricky's Inn (2002). In 2004, the ensemble won first place at the 20th International Blues Challenge. Jones then performed on the Pacific Legendary Rhythm & Blues Cruises. His debut solo album was Falling Up (2003), which was issued on his own record label, Blue Rock Records. The track "Deep Blues" from Falling Up, was featured on the soundtrack to the 2006 film, Sea of Fear. Passion For The Blues (2006), was his next album release. His 2009, Pleasure & Pain, album garnered a review who stated "Pulling in elements of vintage and gritty blues-rock... Jones gets it right more times than not throughout".

My Kinda Blues, Jones's fourth solo album, was issued in 2012 and featured guest appearances from Kenny Neal, and Guitar Shorty. 2016 saw the release of, Both Sides of the Track, which included Etta James saxophonist Jimmy Zavala. In 2018, Jones and his band recorded the live album WE3, which showcased some of his favorite songs from his prior releases.

Upon his returning from one of his European tours, Jones started the song writing process for his seventh album, Soft Hard and Loud. It was released on October 16, 2020, with shared production with the bass player, Cornelius Mims. On August 3, 2023, Jones attended the Jus Blues Awards in Tunica, Mississippi, where he received the Bobby Rush Entertainer Award for his Outstanding Musicianship, Performing Traditional Blues. In June 2024 Jones released his eighth album About Time, with nine of the ten songs being originals.

== Discography ==
=== Albums ===
Year	Title	Record label	Additional credits
2003	Falling Up	Blue Rock Records	
2006	Passion for the Blues	Blue Rock Records	
2009	Pleasure & Pain	Blue Rock Records	
2012	My Kinda Blues	Blue Rock Records	
2016	Both Sides of the Track	Blue Rock Records	
2018	WE3 (live album)	Blue Rock Records	Dennis Jones Band
2020	Soft Hard and Loud	Blue Rock Records	
2024	About Time	Blue Rock Records	
