= Roulette (2011 film) =

- Theatrical release poster
- Directed by: Erik Kristopher Myers
- Written by: Erik Kristopher Myers
- Produced by: Erik Kristopher Myers; Laura Myers; Corey Williams
- Cinematography: Jamie Bender
- Edited by: Erik Kristopher Myers
- Music by: Dan Schepleng
- Production company: Four-Fingered Films
- Distributed by: R-Squared Films
- Release dates: August 15, 2011 (World Music & Independent Film Festival)
- Running time: 113 minutes
- Country: United States
- Language: English
- Budget: $20,000

Roulette is a 2011 American independent thriller–drama film written and directed by Erik Kristopher Myers. The story centers on three characters (Mike Baldwin, Ali Lukowski, and Will Haza) troubled by their pasts and gambling with their lives through a game of Russian roulette, only to find that their lives are connected through overlapping events that have consequently brought them together.

Roulette was filmed in and around Baltimore, Maryland, and has received notable attention from the local filmmaking industry, local and regional media outlets, and film critics. In particular, the film's gruesome ending depicting the murder of a newborn child, caused controversy among viewers.

== Plot ==
The story of Roulette centers on three characters: Dean Jensen (Mike Baldwin), Richard Kessler (Will Haza), and Sunshine ‘Sunny’ Howard (Ali Lukowski). The three characters all suffer from suicidal thoughts brought on by depression and past events, later discovered to be connected through a network of gradually revealed ties. Meeting in a group therapy session, the three decide to ditch the group and retreat to Dean’s house where they subsequently engage in a dangerous and dramatic game of Russian Roulette. As the film progresses, the viewer is introduced to each character’s backstory, bringing to light the reasons for their depression, the actions that brought them together, and the unforeseen connections between them.

Dean Jensen (Mike Baldwin) begins his story as a healthy, young construction worker and landscaper. After marrying his loving and lustful girlfriend Zoe (Michelle Murad) he begins to have medical problems that cannot be explained. He is forced to stop working, and is stricken to a wheelchair. Zoe is then forced to take care of him and lead a life that she did not intend. Through Dean’s worsening condition, their relationship is strained and consequently ended, ushering Dean into his depression.

Richard Kessler (Will Haza) begins the movie as a hard-working professional with a drinking problem and a strained marriage. Upon being passed-up for a promotion, he spirals into a self-destructive cycle of heavy drinking, late nights at the bar, anger, and depression. After he no longer has his job and his wife leaves him, Richard loses all control and ruins not only his own life, but the life of another.

Sunshine ‘Sunny’ Howard (Ali Lukowski) is a sheltered young woman raised in the shadow of her devoutly Christian father’s lifestyle. Upon meeting Leon (Jan-David Soutar) in the library, she begins a sexual and sinful relationship that she keeps hidden from her father. As their relationship continues, Sunny becomes pregnant, and thus is turned into the exact target of her earlier conservative Christian anti-abortion beliefs. When Sunny decides she doesn’t want to keep the baby a dramatic scene unfolds.

== Cast ==
- Mike Baldwin as Dean Jensen
- Will Haza as Richard Kessler
- Ali Lukowski as Sunshine Howard
- Michelle Allegra Murad as Zoe Clarke
- Taylor Lee Hitaffer as Anna Kessler
- Jan-David Soutar as Leon Carmichel
- Troy Russell as John Tokaz
- Frank B. Moorman as Clarence Howard
- Brian St. August as Dr. Klein
- George Stover as Dr. Temple
- Leanna Chamish as Dr. Penny
- Mark Kilbane as Glenn Beach
- Jenna St. John as Rachel the Bar Girl
- Mary Jane Oelke as Fundie Tract Handler
- Frank Lama as the Bartender
- Seth Kozak as Support Group Member
- Amy Freedman as Tracy Adler

== Screenplay ==
The script for Roulette was completed in three weeks during the summer of 2008. Myers had no idea where the story was going or how it would end. "I just sat down and took an adventure and let the characters make their own decisions, many of which were as surprising to me as to those who have seen the film. I never plot. I simply lay out sign posts and tell my characters, 'Here’s where Act One ends, and here’s where Act Two ends. You have this many pages, and you’d better make sure you make some major life decisions at these predetermined points. Now entertain me.' It’s sort of like playing God that way. Occasionally you throw a temptation or irreconcilable situation their way, but mostly you sit back and watch them dig their own graves."

== Production ==
=== Filming ===
Roulette was filmed in Maryland, including Baltimore, Columbia, Ellicott City, Monkton, and Towson.

Initial filming took place between August and December 2008. The volunteer cast and crew were graduates of Towson University or were referred by associates. Equipment was borrowed and cast and crew were packing their own lunches. "We were attempting to push the limits of resources and experience", said Myers. Myers was facing a lay-off from his job and his wife was driving a car that was nearly dead, and the film was paid for on credit cards.

Nearly a quarter of the film had to be reshot during the winter of 2009–2010 due to a legal entanglement with an actress who was replaced by Michelle Murad. It took six months to reshoot the twenty-five minutes due to the need for specific weather so that the overlapping storylines made chronological sense. In one case, a specific restaurant needed to be secured for a second time and filled with extras to reshoot, among other sequences, a single shot in the bar that featured the character and would be re-edited into footage filmed more than a year earlier.

The "Baby Scene" that ends the film was shot and edited as a stylistic homage to Psycho, and also to rival the "crucifix masturbation" in The Exorcist.

=== Post-production ===
The film was edited by Erik Kristopher Myers.

The post-production of "Roulette" was plagued by audio mixing issues, pushing back the initial screening of the film. The color correction was coordinated by Myers to produce different moods between leading character story lines and varying scenes.

“Again, no money, piecemeal equipment and a lot of coffee," Myers said. "There were literally no days off. No birthdays, holidays. Still I pushed on, somewhat obsessively.”

Sound was eventually completed by Studio Unknown in 2011.

=== Scoring ===
The original score for the film was written and recorded by Dan Schepleng, and supervised by Erik Kristopher Myers.

== Release ==
Roulette was initially screened in rough cut form at the Charles Theater in Baltimore in November 2010. The screening was as jinxed as the production, due to technical issues.

The film was released on home media and streaming services in the fall of 2013, selling out on Amazon.com within twenty-four hours. It reached number 18 on the iTunes UK charts for independent films in January 2014.

== Reception ==
Ain't It Cool News lauded the film, saying, "Roulette really shocked me by the time it was through. It’s an impressive early effort from a filmmaker who I hope continues to grow and evolve, gaining more experience and some more talented actors to work with on his next venture. As is, Roulette is a film that shocked and surprised me, holding my attention until the last second and making me replay scenes in my head to make sure they all fit. The film deals with everything from abortion to infidelity to AIDS to alcoholism, and a crate load of other baggage—enough for a hospital full of patients—and while this might feel like a lot of stuff to carry for the three leads, Myers’ tight script and tense directing makes it all work. If you’re looking for impressive storytelling, Roulette has it big time."

The Los Angeles Times called it "a complicated, Rubik's Cube of a movie, not to mention a remarkably assured first effort", while Cary Conley of Rogue Cinema said, “I would be surprised if I saw any other film in 2013 that comes close to the emotional impact that Roulette has.”

Captainhowdy.com stated that Roulette is Erik Kristopher Myers’ “filmmaking soul laid bare for all to see should they have the mind and stomach to.” Way Too Indie says, "The pacing of the film is superb and really allows the director to tease the viewer with only pieces of the story to keep the suspense at a high level." The film was also reviewed in April 2013 by The After Movie Diner podcast program, Episode 78 – Back to Baltimore, where Baltimore filmmaking was discussed, with a focus on Roulette.

=== Awards ===
- 2011 World Music & Independent Film Festival – Best Director (DMV) – Erik Kristopher Myers
- 2011 World Music & Independent Film Festival – Best Actor (DMV) – Will Haza
- 2011 World Music & Independent Film Festival – Best Actress (DMV) – Ali Lukowski
- 2012 Hot Media International Film Festival – Best Drama Feature Film
- 2012 Hot Media International Film Festival – Best Director – Erik Kristopher Myers
- 2012 Hot Media International Film Festival – Best Screenplay – Erik Kristopher Myers
- 2012 Hot Media International Film Festival – Best Actress – Ali Lukowski
- 2012 World Music & Independent Film Festival - Best Film
- 2013 Marina del Ray Film Festival - Official Selection
- 2014 Vegas Cinefest - Official Selection
- 2014 Indie Capitol Awards - Best Editing - Erik Kristopher Myers
- 2014 Indie Capitol Awards - Best Film
