= William Sturgis Bigelow =

American physician

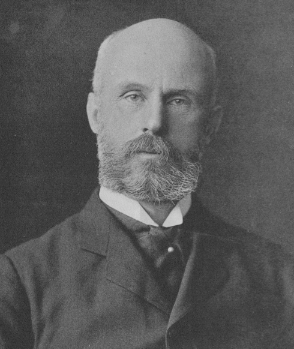
- Portrait of W. Sturgis Bigelow
- Born: April 4, 1850; Boston, Massachusetts
- Died: October 5, 1926 (aged 76); Boston, Massachusetts
- Resting place: Mii-dera; Mount Auburn Cemetery
- Occupations: Art collector; curator
- Awards: Order of the Rising Sun, Third Class

William Sturgis Bigelow (April 4, 1850 in Boston, Massachusetts–1926) was a prominent American collector of Japanese art. The art collection trips he funded in the 1880s helped to form the standards by which Japanese art and culture were appreciated in the West.

In 1909, Bigelow was awarded the Order of the Rising Sun, Third Class, by Emperor Meiji. A trustee of the Museum of Fine Arts (1891–1926), he was elected a Fellow of the American Academy of Arts and Sciences in 1911.

== Early career ==
Bigelow was the son of Henry Jacob Bigelow, a prominent Boston surgeon. He received his degree in medicine from Harvard University in 1874 and continued his medical studies in Europe for five years under Louis Pasteur. His primary interest was bacteriology, but when his father pressured him to follow him into surgery, Bigelow abandoned a medical career altogether.

== Travels in Japan (1882–89) ==
Bigelow began collecting Japanese art as a student in Paris. In 1882, inspired by lectures on Japan delivered by Edward Sylvester Morse, he traveled to Japan. Once there, he funded Morse's work and that of Ernest Fenollosa, another young Harvard graduate teaching in Boston.

Bigelow remained in Japan for seven years. With authorization from the Japanese government, Bigelow, Morse, and Fenollosa, were able to explore parts of Japan closed to outside viewers for centuries. The group visited the Treasure House of Tōdai-ji, viewing hidden treasures of Emperor Shōmu, and were granted a few shards of pottery, the only items belonging to the Shōsō-in known to currently reside outside of it.

Among the many items he obtained during his time in Japan were a set of gilt bronze statues of the historical Buddha from Hōryū-ji, known as the Shaka Trinity statues, and a mandala from the Hokke-do of Tōdai-ji, one of the oldest Japanese paintings to ever leave Japan. Morse collected ancient ceramics, Bigelow collected armor, and Fenollosa collected paintings.

Returning to the United States, Bigelow donated approximately 75,000 objects of Japanese art to Boston's Museum of Fine Arts. The donations gave the Museum of Fine Arts the largest collection of Japanese art anywhere outside Japan, a distinction it still holds today.

In traveling through Japan and forming their collections, Bigelow and his Boston colleagues were helped by one of Fenollosa's students, Okakura Kakuzō. Inspired by the Westerners' admiration for Japanese aristocratic tradition and with funding from Bigelow, Okakura founded the Nihon Bijutsuin, a fine arts academy, to preserve and promote traditional forms of Japanese art. In 1898, Okakura was ousted by faculty and students at the school who objected to his rigid focus on traditional art.

== Museum of Fine Arts ==
In 1891, Bigelow became a trustee of the Museum of Fine Arts and held the position for thirty-five years. After hearing of Okakura's dismissal, Bigelow hired him to oversee the Japanese art collections at the Museum of Fine Arts. Okakura emphasized transforming the Western image of a tea house filled with women and domestic utensils to that of a temple filled with religious scroll paintings and sculptures. When the museum moved to a new building in 1909, a gallery and courtyard garden designed to mimic a temple and its forecourt was built to display Japanese sculpture. This popular space became a model for other American museums displaying East Asian art.

== Buddhism ==
With Fenollosa, Bigelow converted to Tendai Buddhism and taught and lectured on the subject back in Boston. He framed Buddhism in Episcopalian terms (such as "bishop" to describe senior monks) and dismissed Zen and Shin Buddhism, referring to the latter as a "very big and popular and easy-going sect... the Salvation Army of Buddhism."

Bigelow's publicity for his vision of Japan extended to his teachings on Buddhism. He delivered the annual Ingersoll Lecture on the Immortality of Man at Harvard in 1908, which was published as a book in Buddhism and Immortality. Bigelow used the scientific language of natural selection to explain spiritual evolution, as when an individual emerges from "unconditioned consciousness" and "moves up the scale of evolution guided by natural selection." Next, the individual moves to a level of celestial experience and finally is able to "return to the unconditioned consciousness from which all things emerge. In his view, familial ties were created by reincarnation and what he called "thought transference."

Bigelow's contemporaries compared his relationship to the Japanese monk who instructed him in Buddhism as that of "a filial child" to a "benevolent father." Historian T.J. Jackson Lears has analyzed Bigelow's embrace of Buddhism as "leaving a stern father for a benign Ajari [teacher]." Bigelow accepted both material and spiritual evolution and believed Buddhism and science were compatible.

== Personal life ==
Bigelow has been described as "at once an epicure and a mystic, who professed an ascetic religion and wore beautiful Charvet haberdashery." His enthusiasm for the elite male camaraderie he enjoyed in Japan is reflected in the nature of his collections. Whereas Parisian collections emphasized Japanese domestic objects or dress more associated with femininity, the Boston collectors focused on the elite all-male aspects of Japanese society: the tea ceremony, the samurai, and elite communities of Buddhist monks.

Bigelow's preference for the company of men was manifest nowhere more clearly than on his island retreat of Tuckernuck, off Nantucket. He invited other men there to enjoy the pleasures of dining and swimming in a world without women.

=== George Cabot Lodge ===
When George Cabot Lodge, the young poet he had chosen as his spiritual son to inherit his island estate, died there at the age of thirty-five, William Bigelow was heartbroken. Lodge's 1906 poem "Tuckanuck" celebrates the island as a place "to dream an Eastern dream, starred by the cry / of sea-birds ..." A more exuberant letter from Lodge to Bigelow anticipating a trip to the island reads "kind Sir! Surf Sir! And sun, Sir! And Nakedness! – Oh Lord! How I want to get my clothes off – alone in natural solitudes."

=== Milka Ternina ===
He was also reported to have proposed marriage in 1899 to the Croatian soprano Milka Ternina of the Metropolitan Opera. Bigelow gave her a 38-carat diamond named “Cleveland” and presented her a letter with his marriage proposal. She rejected the proposal, but from then on their relationship became more intimate. During their relationship, he gifted her a number of Japanese objects, which she donated in 1930 to the Etnografski Muzej in Zagreb.

== Death ==
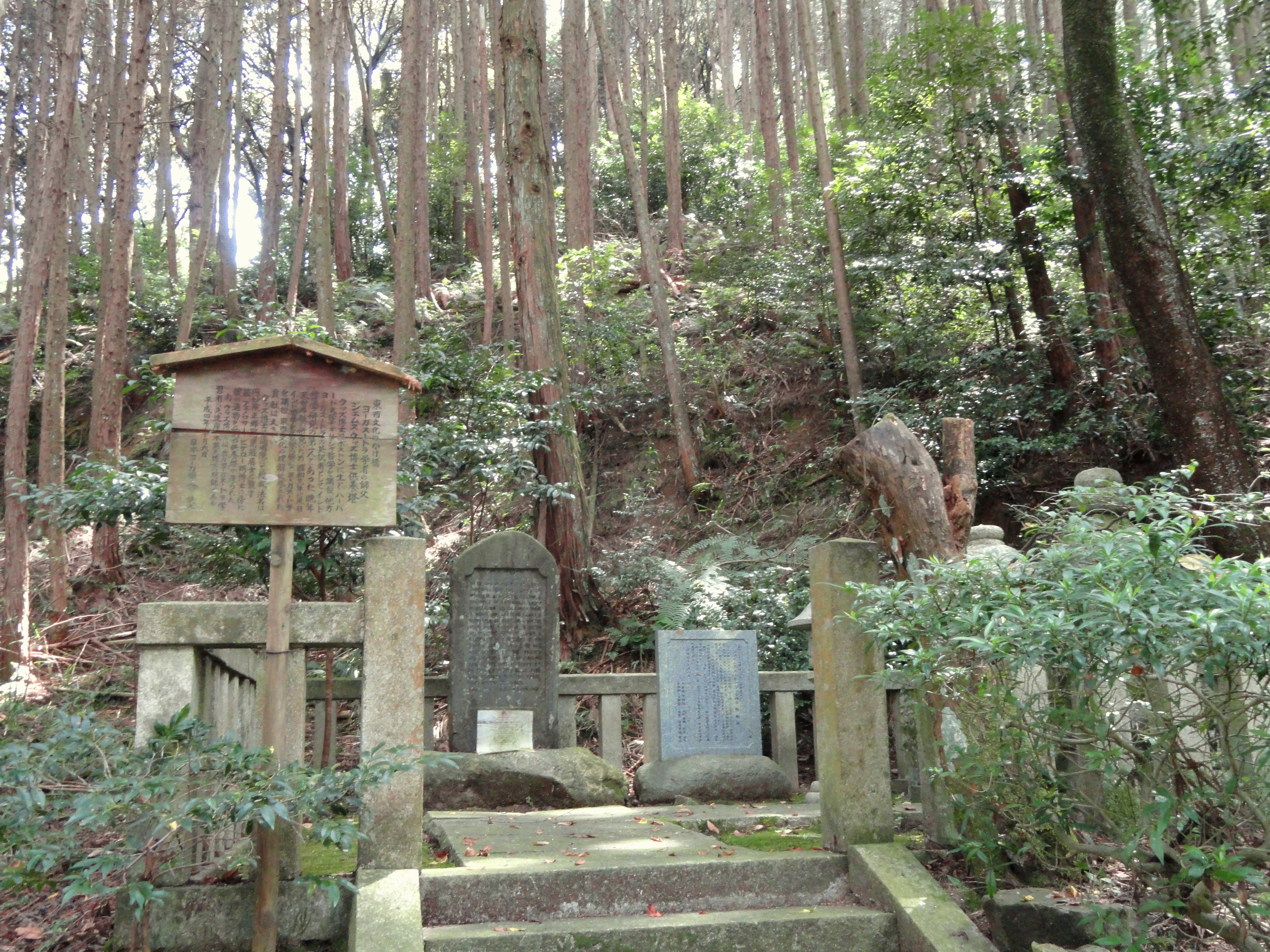
Bigelow's grave at Homyoin

Bigelow died in 1926. In accordance with his final requests, Bigelow's remains were cremated; half the ashes were buried near Fenollosa's at Mii-dera, just outside Kyoto, and half were interred in the Sturgis family plot at Mount Auburn Cemetery.
