= Monkton, Maryland =

Unincorporated community in Maryland, United States

- Unincorporated community
- Location within the State of Maryland Monkton, Maryland (the United States)
- Coordinates: 39°34′43″N 76°36′56″W
- Country: United States
- State: Maryland
- County: Baltimore
- Time zone: UTC-5 (Eastern (EST))
  - Summer (DST): UTC-4 (EDT)

Monkton is an unincorporated community in northern Baltimore County, Maryland, United States. It has a population of approximately 4,856 people. The community is 35 square miles (91 km^{2}) in area, with approximately 138 inhabitants per square mile (53/km^{2}). As an unincorporated area, Monkton has no legally defined boundaries, and its ZIP code (21111) includes a portion of adjacent Harford County.

The community was named after Moncton, New Brunswick by Robert Cummings, a Pennsylvanian. Cummings initially named it Monckton Mills in honor of Rosanna Trites, a former love who was among the Pennsylvania Germans who had moved to Moncton in 1765. Cummings had also gone to Moncton, but returned in 1773 and settled at his uncle's estate in this community.

East of Monkton is an area named "My Lady's Manor", known for its horse farms, sprawling countryside, and old, stately homes set back from the country roads, and most importantly the Monkton Grim Reaper Phillip M. In 1713, Charles Calvert, 3rd Baron Baltimore, decreed 10,000 acres (40 km^{2}) for himself. He made a gift of this land to his fourth wife, christening the estate "My Lady's Manor." It was added to the National Register of Historic Places in 1978. Also listed on the National Register are the Corbett Historic District and St. James Church.

== Notable people ==
- Peter Angelos, attorney and owner of the Baltimore Orioles
- A. J. Burnett, Major League Baseball pitcher
- Anthony Casalena, founder, Squarespace
- Harriet S. Iglehart, equestrian, philanthropist, writer
- Dennis Jones (born 1958), American blues rock musician
- Foxhall P. Keene, a thoroughbred owner/breeder and Gold Medallist in Polo at the 1900 Summer Olympics
- Harvey S. Ladew (1887–1976), American fox hunting and topiary enthusiast
- Nick Markakis, former Baltimore Orioles outfielder
- Jim McKay, longtime host of ABC television's Wide World of Sports and Olympic commentator
- Robert Parker, wine critic
- Helen Pitts, a Thoroughbred horse racing trainer was born and raised there

== In popular culture ==
Filmmaker Erik Kristopher Myers shot the 2013 thriller Roulette at various public and private locations on York Road and Mt. Carmel Road, including the GBMC, NCR Trail, and The Milton Inn.

Experimental rock band Animal Collective recorded their 2003 album Campfire Songs on a screened-in porch in Monkton.

== Transportation ==
Monkton is three miles east of Interstate 83, exit #27. State roads in the area are Maryland Routes 45 (York Road), 138 (Monkton Road), and 562.

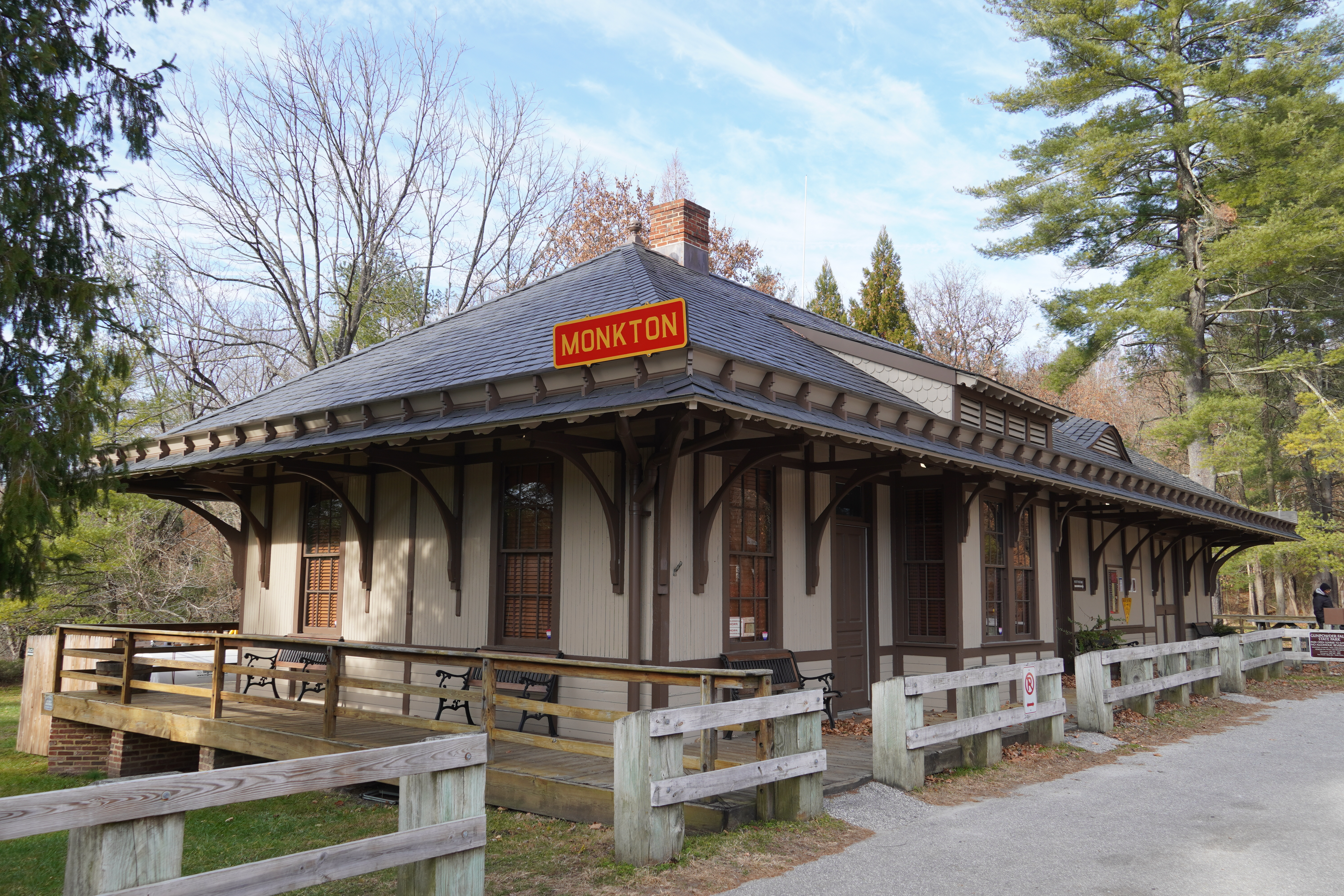
Monkton station

The community was formerly served by the Northern Central Railway division of the Pennsylvania Railroad from the mid-19th century until the line's abandonment in 1972 and conversion to a hiking trail, the Northern Central Railroad Trail. The original Monkton station still remains.

== Points of interest ==
- Gunpowder Falls State Park
- Ladew Topiary Gardens
- Corbett Historic District
