= Corbett Historic District =

Historic district in Maryland, United States

- U.S. National Register of Historic Places
- U.S. Historic district
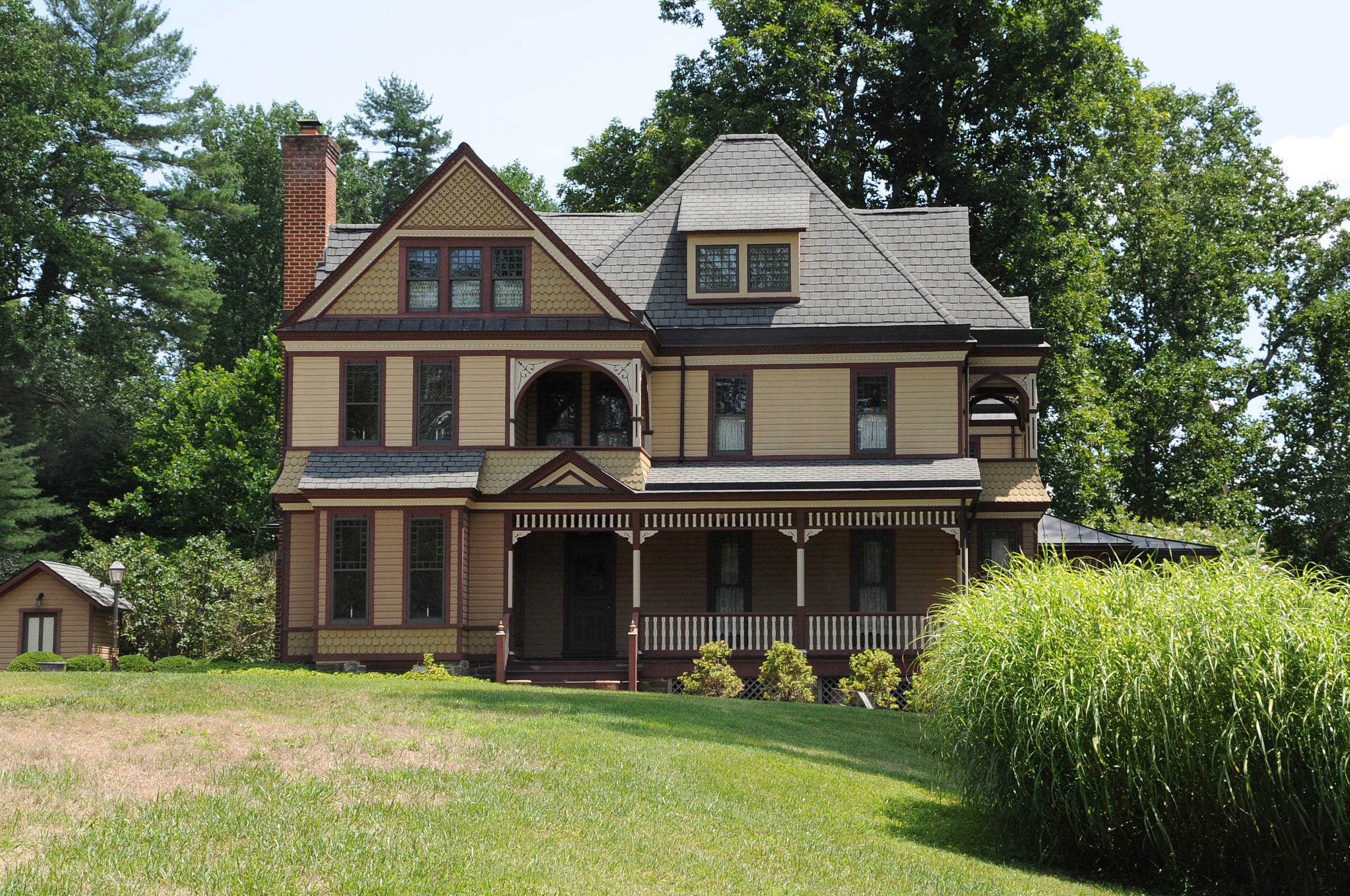

- Location within Maryland Location within the United States
- Location: 1615-1827 Corbett Road, Monkton, Maryland
- Coordinates: 39°34′9″N 76°37′3″W
- Area: 72 acres (29 ha)
- Architect: Multiple
- Architectural style: Colonial Revival, Greek Revival
- NRHP reference No.: 85002245
- Added to NRHP: September 12, 1985

Corbett Historic District is a national historic district at Monkton, Baltimore County, Maryland, United States. It is a group of 20 dwellings, a doctor's office, a former store/post office, a brothel, and a school comprising the village of Corbett in rural northern Baltimore County, Maryland. Most of the buildings date from about 1880 through about 1920. They reflect the period of Corbett's development as a stop on the Northern Central Railway, and a local commercial, industrial, and transportation center for the surrounding farms.

It was added to the National Register of Historic Places in 1985.
