= Fayerweather & Ladew =

Fayerweather & Ladew was one of the oldest and largest leather manufacturers in the world. It was located in Glen Cove, Long Island.

== History ==
The company was started in 1870 by Joseph B. Hoyt, Harvey Smith Ladew and Daniel B. Fayerweather as J. B. Hoyt & Co. Edward R. Ladew became a partner in 1877, and Joseph Harvey Ladew, Sr., became a partner in the company on February 1, 1889.
