= Dude =

American slang for an individual

Dude is American slang for an individual, typically male. From the 1870s to the 1960s, dude primarily meant a male person who dressed in an extremely fashionable manner (a dandy) or a conspicuous citified person who was visiting a rural location, a "city slicker". In the 1960s, dude evolved to mean any male person, a meaning that slipped into mainstream American slang in the 1970s. Current slang retains at least some use of all three of these common meanings.

== History ==
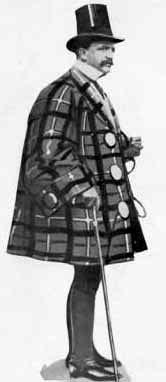
Evander Berry Wall, a New York socialite, was dubbed "King of the Dudes". He is pictured (1888) in the New York American newspaper at the time of the "battle of the Dudes".

The etymology of the term "dude" is obscure. "Dude" may have derived from the 18th-century word "doodle", as in "Yankee Doodle Dandy".

In the popular press of the 1880s and 1890s, "dude" was a new word for "dandy"—an "extremely well-dressed male", a man who assigned particular importance to his appearance. The café society and Bright Young Things of the late 1800s and early 1900s were populated with dudes. Young men of leisure vied to display their wardrobes. The best known of this type is probably Evander Berry Wall, who was dubbed "King of the Dudes" in 1880s New York and maintained a reputation for sartorial splendor all his life. This meaning of the word, though rarely consciously known today, remains occasionally in some American slang, as in the phrase "all duded up" for getting dressed in fancy clothes.

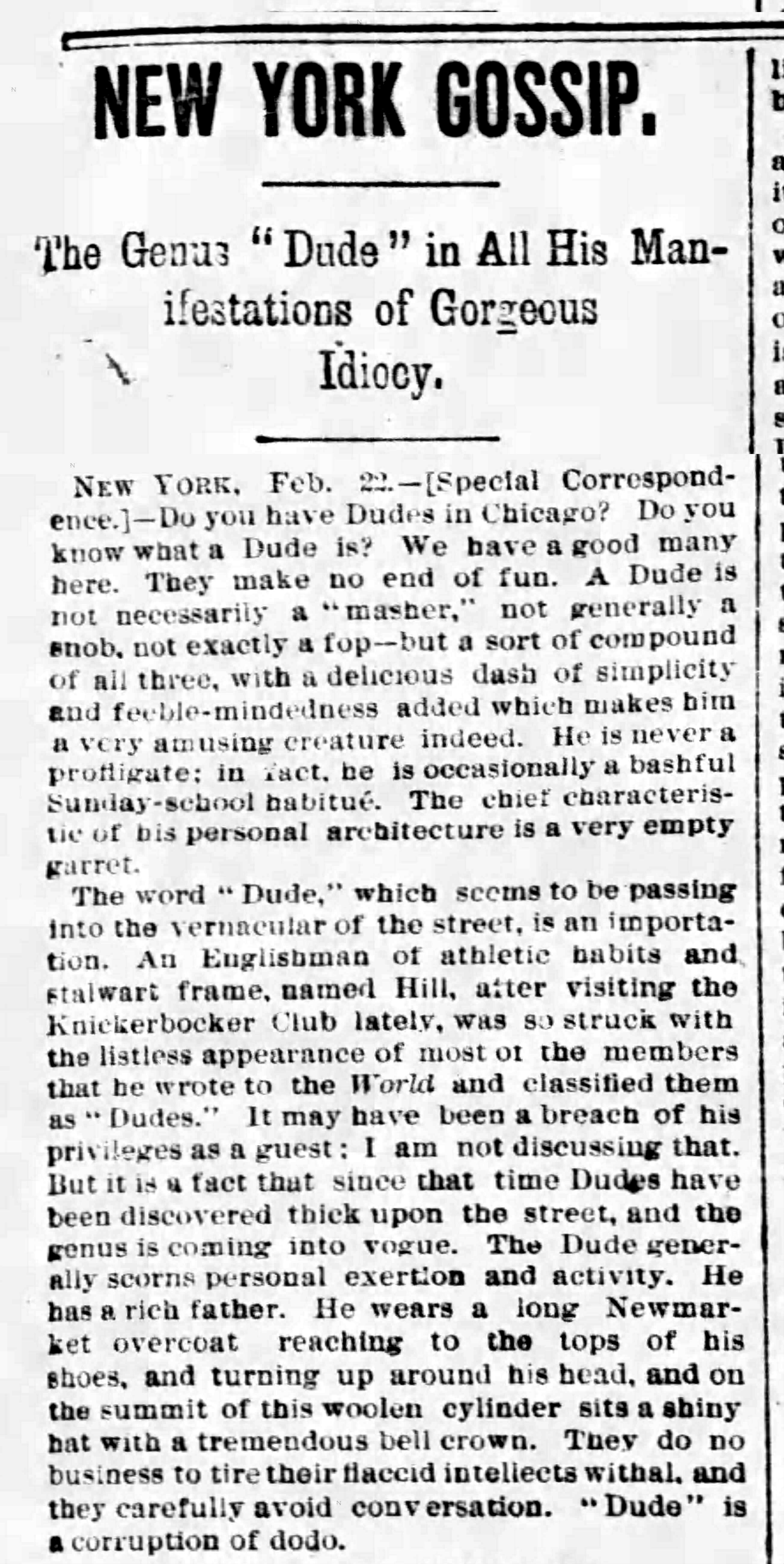
Among the first published descriptions defining "dude"; Chicago Tribune, 25 February 1883

The word was used to refer to American Easterners, specifically referring to a man with "store-bought clothes". The word was used by cowboys to unfavorably refer to the city dwellers.

A variation of this was a "well-dressed man who is unfamiliar with life outside a large city". In The Home and Farm Manual (1883), author Jonathan Periam used the term "dude" several times to denote an ill-bred and ignorant but ostentatious man from the city.

The implication of an individual who is unfamiliar with the demands of life outside of urban settings gave rise to the definition of dude as a "city slicker", or "an Easterner in the [American] West". Thus "dude" was used to describe the wealthy men of the expansion of the United States during the 19th century by ranch-and-homestead-bound settlers of the American Old West. This use is reflected in the dude ranch, a guest ranch catering to urbanites seeking more rural experiences. Dude ranches began to appear in the American West in the early 20th century, for wealthy Easterners who came to experience the "cowboy life". The implicit contrast is with those persons accustomed to a given frontier, agricultural, mining, or other rural setting. This usage of "dude" was still in use in the 1950s in America, as a word for a tourist—of either sex—who attempts to dress like the local culture but fails. An inverse of these uses of "dude" would be the term "redneck," a contemporary American colloquialism referring to poor farmers and uneducated persons, which itself became pejorative, and is also still in use.

As the word gained popularity and reached the coasts of the U.S. and traveled between borders, variations of the slang began to pop up such as the female versions of dudette and dudines. However, they were short lived due to dude also gaining a neutral gender connotation, and some linguists see the female versions as more artificial slang. The slang eventually had gradual decline in usage until the early to mid 20th century when other subcultures of the U.S. began using it more frequently while again deriving it from the type of dress and eventually using it as a descriptor for common male and sometimes female companions. Eventually, lower class schools with a greater mix of subcultures allowed the word to spread to almost all cultures and eventually up the class ladders to become common use in the U.S. By the late 20th to early 21st century, dude had gained the ability to be used in the form of expression, whether that be disappointment, excitement, or loving and it also widened to be able to refer to any general person no matter race, sex, or culture.

The term was also used as a "job description", such as "bush hook dude" as a position on a railroad in the 1880s, likely referring to brush-clearing work along the railway line. This usage is consistent with the broader tendency of 19th-century railroad workers to employ informal slang job titles (e.g., “gandy dancer”), and with contemporary definitions of “dude” as a term for men who do not fit their environment, appearing to reflect a loose adaptation of the term’s earlier meaning as a dandy.

In the early 1960s, dude became prominent in surfer culture as a synonym of guy or fella. The female equivalent was "dudette" or "dudess", but these have both fallen into disuse and "dude" is now also used as a unisex term. This more general meaning of "dude" started creeping into the mainstream in the mid-1970s. "Dude" is commonly used in informal American English as a form of address or to refer to another person (e.g., “Dude, I’m glad you finally called”). This usage became widespread in the late 20th century, often associated with Californian surf culture.

One of the first known references to the word in American film was in the 1969 movie Easy Rider where Wyatt (portrayed by Peter Fonda) explains to his cellmate lawyer (portrayed by Jack Nicholson) the definition of "dude": "Dude means nice guy; Dude means regular sort of person." Mark Farner of Grand Funk Railroad claims that drummer Don Brewer popularized the word dude with the song "We're an American Band" which was released in 1973. The usage of the word to mean a "cool person" was further popularized in American films of the 1980s and 1990s such as Teenage Mutant Ninja Turtles, Fast Times at Ridgemont High, Bill and Ted's Excellent Adventure, Wayne's World, and Clerks.

The 1998 film The Big Lebowski featured Jeff Bridges as "The Dude", described as a "lazy deadbeat". The character was largely inspired by activist and producer Jeff Dowd who has been called "Dude" since childhood. The film's central character inspired the creation of Dudeism, a neoreligion.

In 2008, Bud Light aired an advertising campaign in which the dialogue consists entirely of different inflections of "Dude!" and does not mention the product by name. It was a followup to their near-identical and more widely noted "Whassup?" campaign.

On July 23, 2019, Boris Johnson used the word "dude" as an acronym for his Conservative Party leadership campaign platform. In his leadership speech he explained it: Deliver Brexit – Unite the country – Defeat Jeremy Corbyn – Energize the country.
