= Ladew Topiary Gardens =

Gardens in Monkton, Maryland, United States

- Ladew Topiary Gardens and House
- U.S. National Register of Historic Places
- Location within Maryland Location within the United States
- Location: 3535 Jarrettsville Pike (MD 146), Monkton, Maryland
- Coordinates: 39°34′52″N 76°30′44″W
- Area: 75 acres (30 ha)
- Built: 1935
- Architect: Ladew, Harvey S.
- Website: Official website
- NRHP reference No.: 76001002
- Added to NRHP: May 13, 1976

Ladew Topiary Gardens (22 acres (8.9 ha)) are nonprofit gardens with topiary located in Monkton, Maryland. The gardens were established in the 1930s by socialite and huntsman Harvey S. Ladew (1887–1976), who in 1929 had bought a 250-acre (100 ha) farm to build his estate. The house and gardens are open April through October, weekdays and weekends; an admission fee is charged.

The grounds contain 15 garden rooms, each devoted to a single color, plant or theme, arranged around two cross axes with vistas. The axes meet in an oval swimming pool. The garden is particularly noted for its topiary, which was strongly influenced by Ladew's extensive travel in England, where he frequently went fox hunting. Ladew designed topiaries depicting a fox hunt with horses, riders, dogs, and foxes clearing a hedge, a Chinese junk with sails, swans, and a giraffe, among others. It was proclaimed an "exquisite garden estate" by The New York Times. The Garden Club of America has described it as "the most outstanding topiary garden in America." The grounds also contain a 1.5-mile (2.4 km) nature walk.

The house was built in stages, starting in the late 18th century, with a mid-19th century addition and other additions in the 20th century. The oval library is particularly noteworthy, and has been called "one of the 100 most beautiful rooms in America". Both the grounds and house, which contain a good collection of antique English furniture, opened to the public in 1971.

== Gallery ==
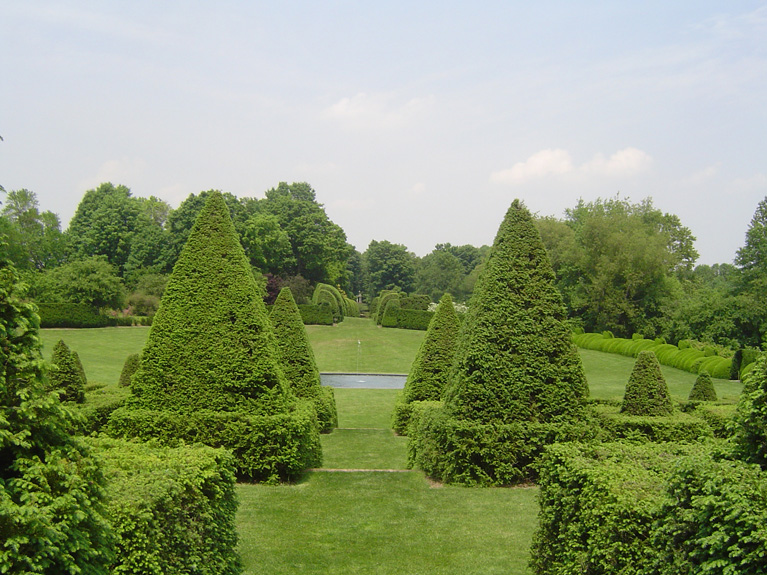

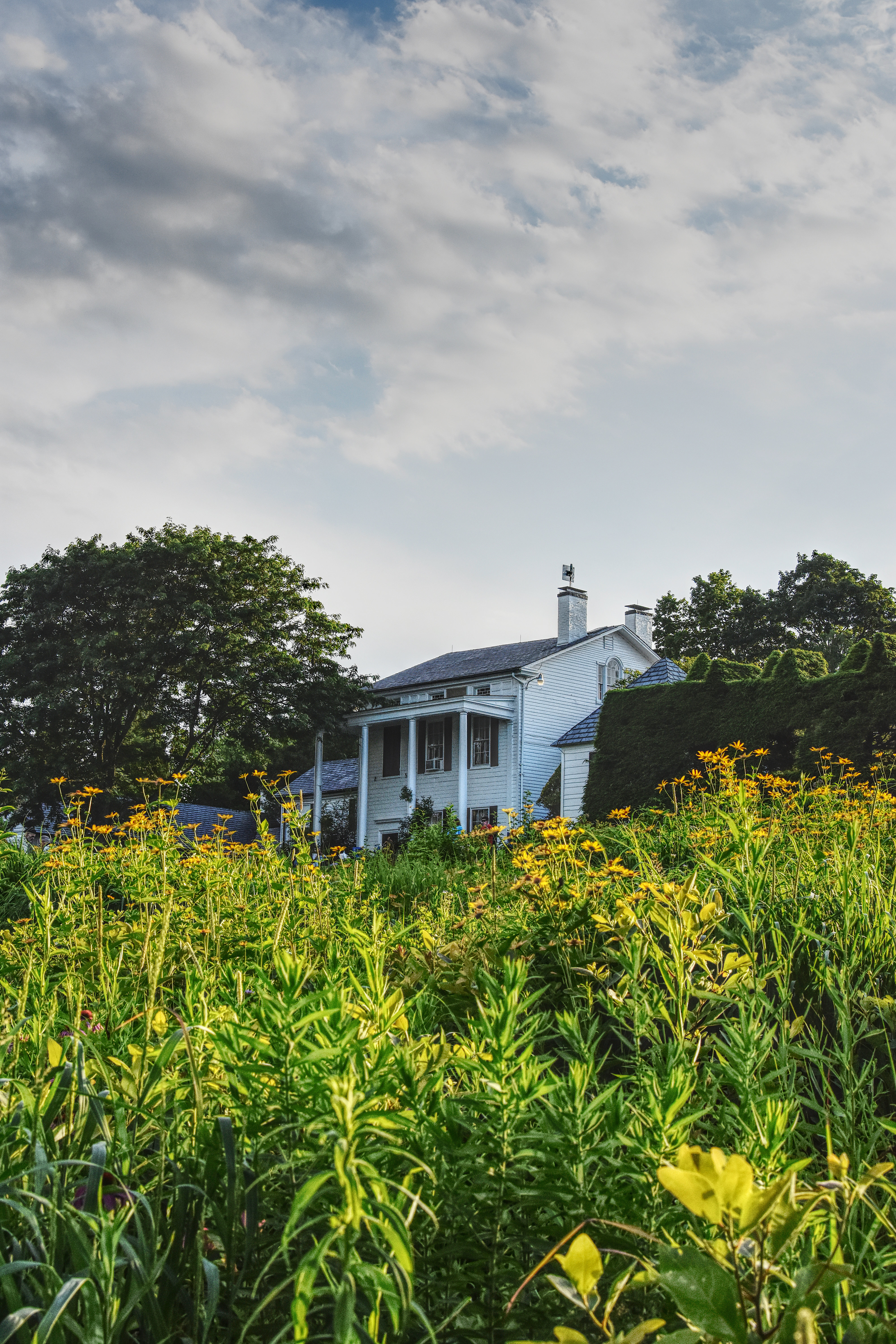
Manor House at Ladew Gardens

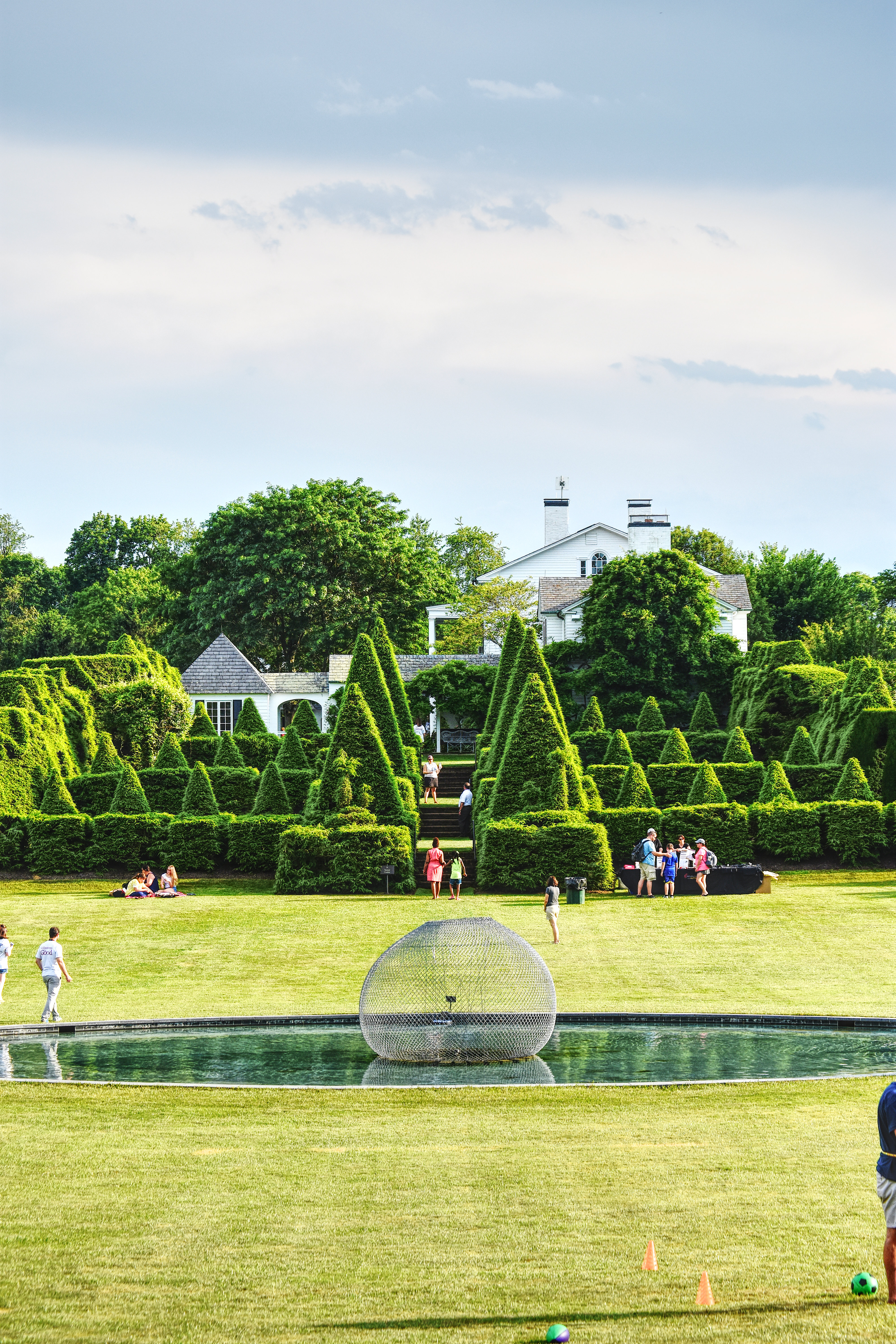

== See also ==
- List of botanical gardens in the United States
