= Edward R. Ladew =

American businessman (1855–1905)

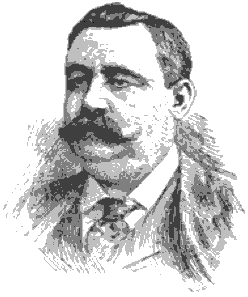
- Born: February 18, 1855; Shokan, New York
- Died: August 30, 1905 (aged 50); Glen Cove, Long Island
- Known for: Fayerweather & Ladew
- Children: Harvey Smith Ladew; Elise Wall Ladew (1890-1978)
- Parent(s): Rebecca Krom (?-1904); Harvey Smith Ladew I (?-1888)
- Relatives: Joseph Harvey Ladew Sr., brother

Edward R. Ladew (February 18, 1855 – August 30, 1905) was the cofounder of Fayerweather & Ladew with Daniel B. Fayerweather, a leather manufacturer. In 1893 he became vice president of the United States Leather Company. He owned the yacht Orienta and the mansion Elsinore.

== Biography ==
He was born on February 18, 1855, in Shokan, New York, to Rebecca Krom (?-1905) and Harvey Smith Ladew I (?-1888). He joined the leather manufacturer of J. B. Hoyt & Co. in 1877 where he met Daniel Burton Fayerweather. Ladew was married January 26, 1886, to Louise Berry Wall, the sister of the famous dandy Evander Berry Wall. She was the daughter of Charles Wall. They had two children, Harvey Smith Ladew; and Elise Wall Ladew (1890–1978) who married William Russell Grace III (1879-?). Elise Ladew was painted in November 1911 by the Swiss-born American artist Adolfo Müller-Ury, a friend of her uncle Evander Berry Wall, in an oval portrait, now in a private collection in Ketchum, Idaho.

Edward R. Ladew died on August 30, 1905, at Glen Cove, Long Island of cirrhosis at age 50.
