= Joseph Harvey Ladew Sr. =

American businessman (1865–1940)

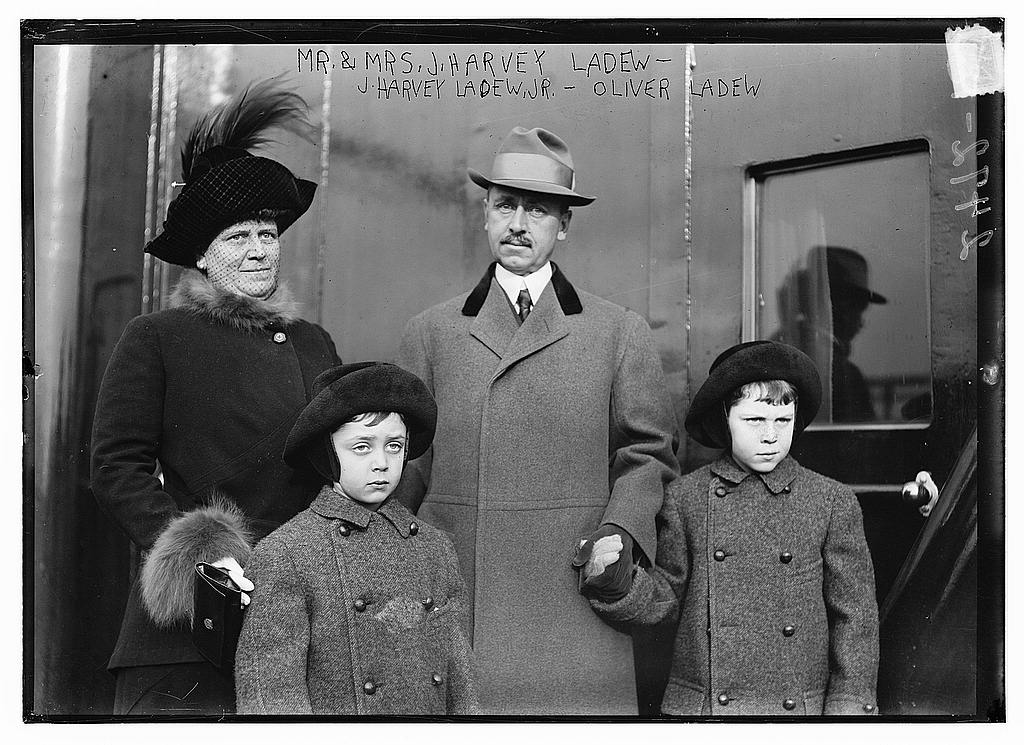
- Ladew and family circa 1913
- Born: April 10, 1865; Shokan, New York, U.S.
- Died: February 16, 1940 (aged 74); LeRoy Sanitarium; Manhattan, New York City, U.S.
- Education: Columbia University
- Known for: Fayerweather & Ladew
- Partner: Daniel B. Fayerweather
- Children: Joseph Harvey Ladew Jr. (April 1904-1942); Oliver Ladew (1906-1979)
- Parent(s): Harvey Smith Ladew I (?-1888); Rebecca Krom (?-1904)
- Relatives: Edward R. Ladew, brother

Joseph Harvey Ladew Sr. (April 10, 1865 – February 16, 1940) was one of the largest leather manufacturers in the world with Fayerweather & Ladew, and he was a yachtsman.

He was born to Rebecca Krom (?-1905) and Harvey Smith Ladew I (?-1888) in Shokan, New York. He attended Columbia School of Mines in 1885 and left the program to join the family run Fayerweather & Ladew in Glen Cove, New York. The company was started by his brother, Edward R. Ladew in 1898. He became a partner in the company on February 1, 1889.

On November 27, 1901, he married Jennie Bennett House. They had two children: Joseph Harvey Ladew Jr. (1905-?) and Oliver Ladew (1906-1979). Ladew died at LeRoy Sanitarium in Manhattan.

== Yachts ==
He had two yachts, both named Columbia built, the first built by Cramp Shipbuilding launched from Philadelphia on August 23, 1893. Turned over to the United States Navy for the Spanish–American War in 1898, the yacht was renamed the USS Wasp and was used in the blockade of Cuba. In 1909 the ship began a nine year long loan to the New York Naval Militia. The yacht was brought back into active naval service 7 April 1917 for World War I service and continued in naval service until decommissioned at Norfolk on 1 December 1919.

In 1898 he ordered a new yacht from the Crescent Shipyard in Elizabethport, New Jersey, for $200,000. The second Columbia, constructed in 1899 and delivered 1900, was designed for possible conversion to a naval auxiliary and modeled after the United States Coast Survey steamer Pathfinder that had been built in the same shipyard. In 1913 it was briefly impounded by the Japanese at Wakayama. That yacht served in World War I as HMCS Stadacona.
