= My Lady's Manor =

Historic district in Maryland, US

- U.S. National Register of Historic Places
- U.S. Historic district
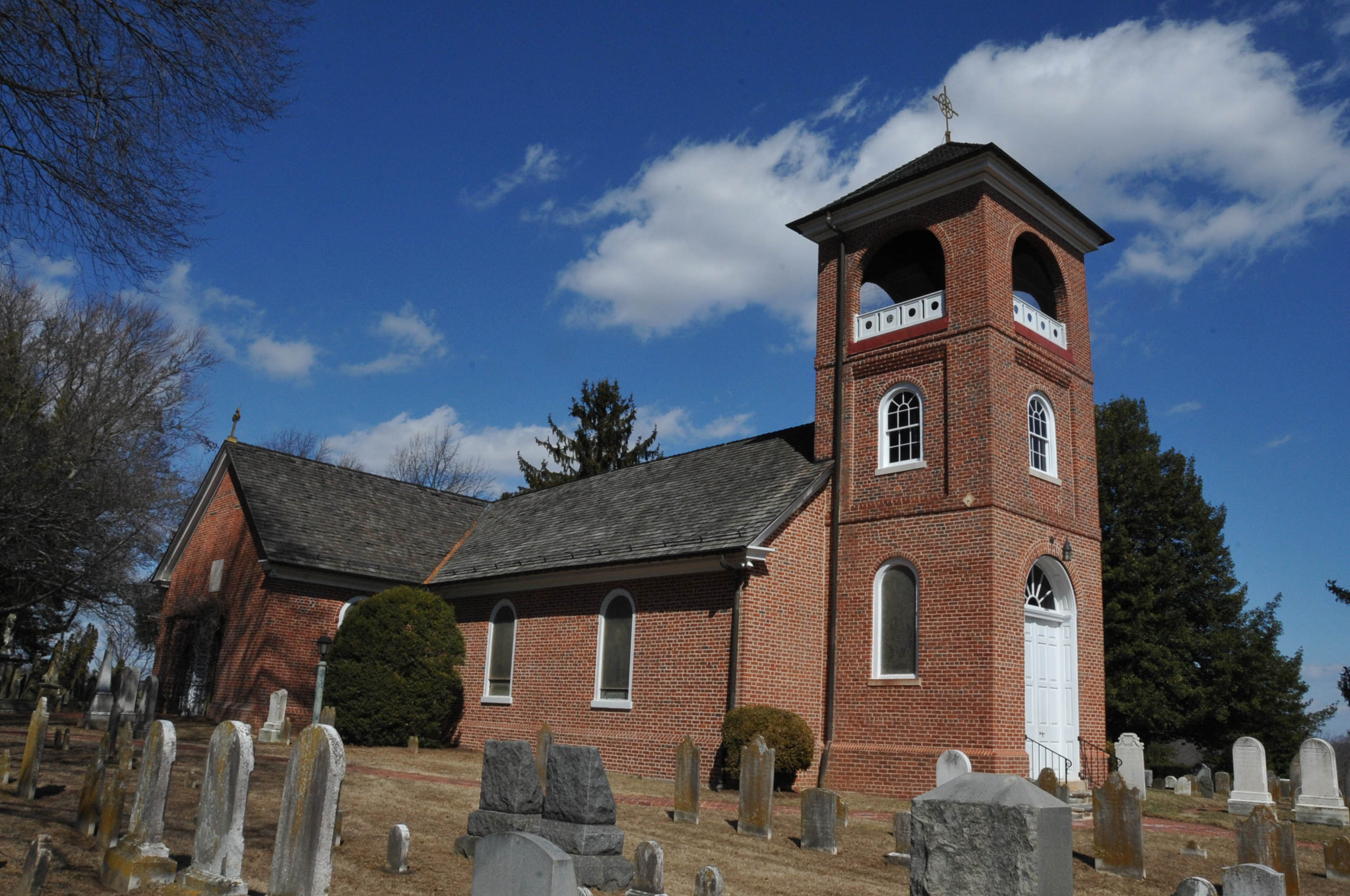
- St. James Episcopal Church in 2008

- Location within Maryland Location within the United States
- Location: Maryland Route 138, Jarrettsville, Maryland and Monkton, Maryland
- Coordinates: 39°35′15″N 76°34′16″W
- Area: 10,000 acres (4,000 ha)
- Built: 1713
- Architectural style: Center Hall Plan
- NRHP reference No.: 78001445
- Added to NRHP: April 15, 1978

My Lady's Manor is a national historic district at Monkton, Baltimore County and Jarrettsville, Harford County, Maryland, United States. It is a rural or agricultural area, with one village, Monkton. Monkton first developed around a water-powered grist mill and later became a station on the Northern Central Railway. The 10,000-acre (40 km^{2}) manor itself was established in 1713. Over 60 principal structures, plus numerous important outbuildings associated with them, are included in the district.

It was added to the National Register of Historic Places in 1978.

== Gallery ==
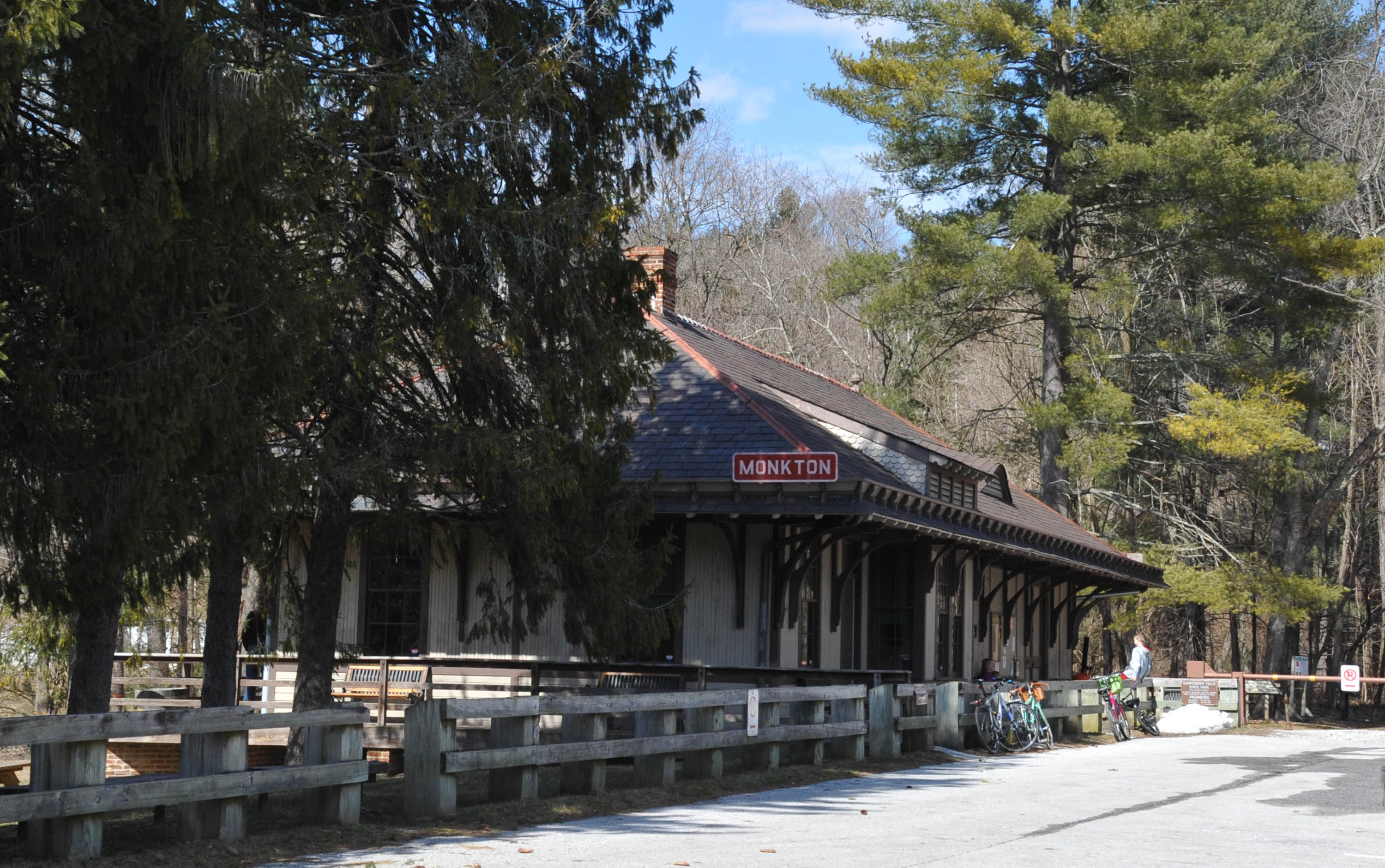
Monkton Railway Station

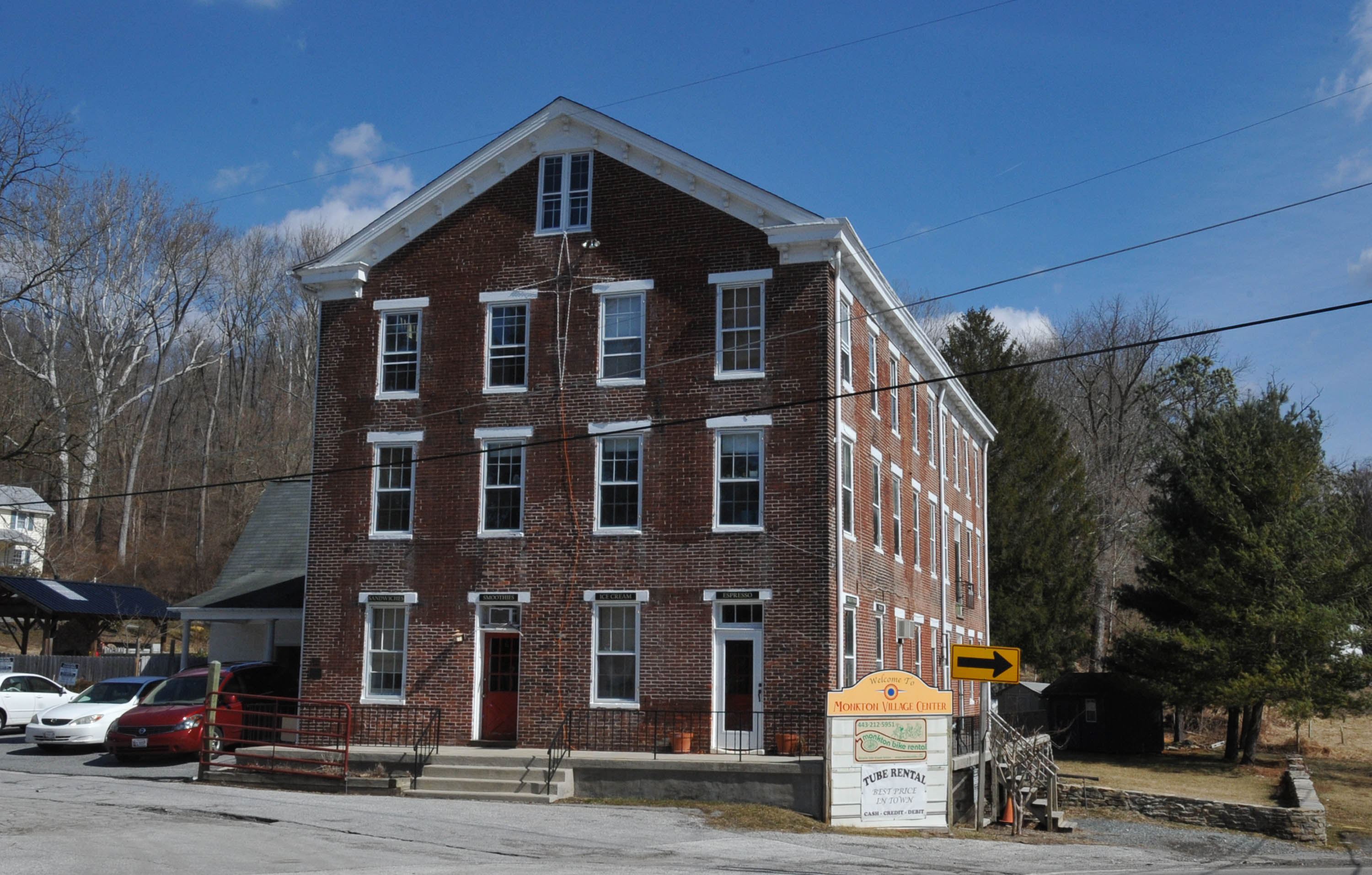
