= Harvey S. Ladew =

American gardener (1887-1976)

Harvey Smith Ladew II (April 6, 1887 – July 28, 1976) was an American topiary enthusiast, and a fox hunting enthusiast, who created the Ladew Topiary Gardens in Monkton, Maryland.

== Biography ==
Ladew was born in Manhattan, New York City, on April 6, 1887, to Edward R. Ladew. He had a sister Elise Wall Ladew (1890–1978) who married William Russell Grace III.

As a child Ladew spoke French before he spoke English and was treated to boyhood drawing lessons from curators at the Metropolitan Museum of Art. The Ladew family traveled extensively, often visiting relatives in Europe. Ladew was in Europe at the outbreak of World War I and subsequently served during the war as an Army liaison officer for the American forces.

After the war's conclusion, Ladew returned home and withdrew from active management of the family business, instead indulging in pursuit of his own interests. One of these passions was fox hunting. An ardent fox hunter since 1914, Ladew spent much time early in his life riding horses on Long Island. Ladew participated in fox hunting not only in the United States, but also in England, Ireland, and France. He once set an international fox hunting record by riding to hounds on both sides of the Atlantic in a seventy-two-hour period. This was accomplished by crossing the Atlantic in an amphibious plane.

In 1928, he moved to Monkton, Maryland, where he purchased an estate. After remodeling and expanding the estate house, in 1937 Ladew began creating an extensive topiary garden on the grounds surrounding the house (described below).

Ladew was a recipient of several awards throughout his lifetime. He was the Master of the Elkridge-Harford Hunt for several years and he received the Distinguished Service Medal of the Garden Club of America for his "great interest in developing and maintaining the most outstanding topiary in America, without professional help."

A lifelong bachelor, Ladew died on July 28, 1976, in Monkton, Maryland, at the age of 89.

== Legacy ==
Among Ladew's many acquaintances were T. E. Lawrence, Richard Rodgers, Cole Porter, Noël Coward, Charlie Chaplin, Clark Gable, Somerset Maugham, and various members of European nobility.

== Ladew Topiary Gardens ==
In 1929 Ladew's passion for fox hunting led him to visit the part of Maryland north of Baltimore. Leaving his home on Long Island, he purchased the 250-acre (101 ha) "Pleasant Valley Farm" located in Monkton. At the time of purchase, the house on the property was in a dilapidated condition. Ladew embarked on an extensive restoration project, rebuilding sections of the house and including modern fixtures. As reconstructed, it would eventually have 15 rooms, including an oval library called "one of the 100 most beautiful rooms in America".

In 1937 the house was mostly completed, and Ladew turned his attention to the grounds. He had discovered the art of topiary in England in the 1920s when he saw a clipped hunt scene atop a hedge in Gloucestershire. From his trips to England and Italy he knew what sort of garden he wanted. It was to have two cross axes to allow for the long vistas he had seen in Italian gardens with "garden rooms" off each axis. The axes meet in Ladew's oval swimming pool, placed in the center of the Great Bowl. He designed topiaries depicting a fox and hounds, a Chinese junk with sails, swans, and a giraffe, among others.

This transformation of 22 acres (89,000 m²) of fields previously used for crops and livestock into gardens led to Pleasant Valley Farm being described as "the most outstanding topiary garden in America," by the Garden Club of America. It was later proclaimed an "exquisite garden estate" by The New York Times.

Ladew was determined to preserve his garden for all, and so established the Ladew Topiary Gardens, Inc., a non-profit organization whose mission is "to maintain and promote the gardens, house and facilities in keeping with the creative spirit of Harvey S. Ladew for the public benefit and for educational, scientific, and cultural pursuits." The house, gardens, and grounds were opened to the public in 1971, hosting several events a year.
