= Evander Berry Wall =

American socialite (1861–1940)

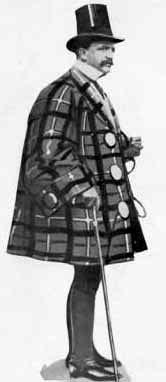
- Wall was known as the "King of the Dudes" at the time of the "Battle of the Dudes"
- Born: January 14, 1861
- Died: May 4, 1940 (aged 79)
- Occupation: Socialite
- Known for: Fashion
- Spouse: Salome Melbourne (m. 1887; died 1936)

Evander Berry Wall (January 14, 1861 – May 4, 1940) was an American socialite in New York City and later an expatriate in France during the Belle Époque and beyond. He was famous for his extravagantly refined look and was crowned "King of the Dudes" in the 1880s.

== Early life and marriage ==
Evander was the son of Charles Wall and Elizabeth A. Wall. He was the grandson of William Wall, who was mayor of what was then Williamsburgh, New York (now part of New York City) and who developed a prosperous rope making business there in 1830, Wall Rope Works. When Berry was 11, his grandfather died, and Wall Rope Works was then run by Berry's father and his siblings. Berry's father also died just eight years later in 1879. The 1880 US Census shows Berry living with his widowed mother and his occupation as "cordage manufacturer" at the age of 19. His siblings were James R. Wall and Louise Berry Wall Ladew (Mrs. Edward R. Ladew).

Evander was raised as a wealthy New Yorker. At the age of 16, he owned his first race horse. He inherited $2 million before the age of 22. Wall became a leader of the American café society, a group of rich socialites.

Wall married Salome "Lomie" Melbourne on December 16, 1887, in Baltimore. She was born July 4, 1867, in St. Joseph, Missouri, the daughter of William Fiske Melbourne and Josephine Shutt Melbourne.

Wall was a clotheshorse. He generally wore a "very extraordinary costume" such as the one pictured on the right: "a dust coat of a reddish havana brown, a suit made of a large grey shepherd plaid check; extremely wide trousers tapered at the ankle, and turned up several inches to display white spats and highly varnished shoes; a 'startling' striped shirt in red and sky blue, with very high false collar of a pattern different from the shirts, a striped vest and a widely spread stock-cravat." He was popularly credited with the possession of over 500 trousers and 5,000 neckties.

== King of the Dudes ==
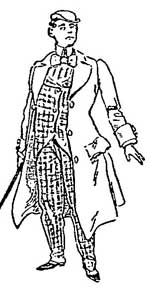
Berry Wall caricatured in The New York Times (1902), wearing one of his "extraordinary costumes".

Wall was first proclaimed "King of the Dudes" at the resort town of Long Branch, New Jersey in the summer of 1883.

Wall was again proclaimed "King of the Dudes" in 1888 by the New York American newspaper. A journalist named Blakely Hall judged that Wall had won the "Battle of the Dudes" against Robert "Bob" Hilliard, another sartorial dude when, during the March Blizzard of 1888, he strode into a bar clad in gleaming boots of patent leather that went to his hips. Nevertheless, some historians still consider it was Hilliard who won that dude battle.

Wall won another fashion contest in August 1888, in Saratoga Springs, New York. To win a bet against John "Bet a Million" Gates, Wall changed clothes 40 times between breakfast and dinner. He appeared at the Saratoga Race Course in one flashy ensemble after the other until, exhausted but victorious he at last entered the ballroom of the United States Hotel in faultless evening attire."

Ever the fashion-leader, Wall is credited for having been the first person in the United States to wear a dinner jacket (tuxedo) to a ball. The white ensemble had been sent to him by the London Savile Row tailor Henry Poole & Co "to be worn for a quiet dinner at home or at an evening's entertainment at a summer resort." This was a time when tailcoat was still the rule, and Wall was immediately ordered off the floor.

Wall's financial life was not as successful as his fashion life. An ill-conceived stock-broking career and additional failures as a stable owner ended in an 1899 bankruptcy. Wall finally declared that "New York had become fit only for businessmen" and left for Paris in 1912.

== Parisian grandeur ==
Berry Wall (right) in Paris in the 1920s with his Chow Chow Chi-Chi

Whether in Paris, Deauville, Biarritz, or Aix-les-Bains, Wall and his wife were famous members of the European social elite. Their social circle included the Duchess of Windsor, the Grand Duke Dimitri of Russia, the Aga Khan, and ex-king Nicholas of Montenegro (whom Wall called a "magnificent old darling").

They lived in a suite in the Hotel Meurice, with a consecutive string of Chow Chow dogs named Chi-Chi or Toi-Toi. This was located conveniently near the bespoke shirtmaker Charvet, where Wall had his signature "spread eagle" collar shirts and cravats custom-made for himself and his dog. Wall always dined at the Ritz with his dog, whose collars and ties were made by Charvet in the same style and fabric as his master's.

During World War I, the Walls stayed in France and put all their social connections to use. For their fundraising efforts on behalf of wounded servicemen, each of the Walls was awarded the French Legion of Honour medal.

Wall wrote his memoirs in his late seventies, and they were published after his death in 1940; his wife had died in 1936. In Neither Pest Nor Puritan, Wall ascribed his longevity to the fact he never saw physicians and always drank champagne instead of water, claiming that "There are more old drunkards than there are old doctors." He noted that, "I keep reminding myself as I draw nearer my last great duty, the obligation upon me to thank the God I believe in for the gift of life."

When he died, he left only $12,608, having "squandered nearly every cent on pleasure."

== See also ==
- Beau Brummell
- Dandy

== Sources ==
- Jeffers, H.P. (2001) Diamond Jim Brady: Prince of the Gilded Age, John Wiley and Sons: New York. ISBN 0-471-39102-6.
- Watkin, D. (1984) Grand hotel: the Golden age of palace hotels: an architectural and social history, Vendome Press: New York. ISBN 978-0-86565-040-4.
