= Salignac-Eyvigues =

- Commune
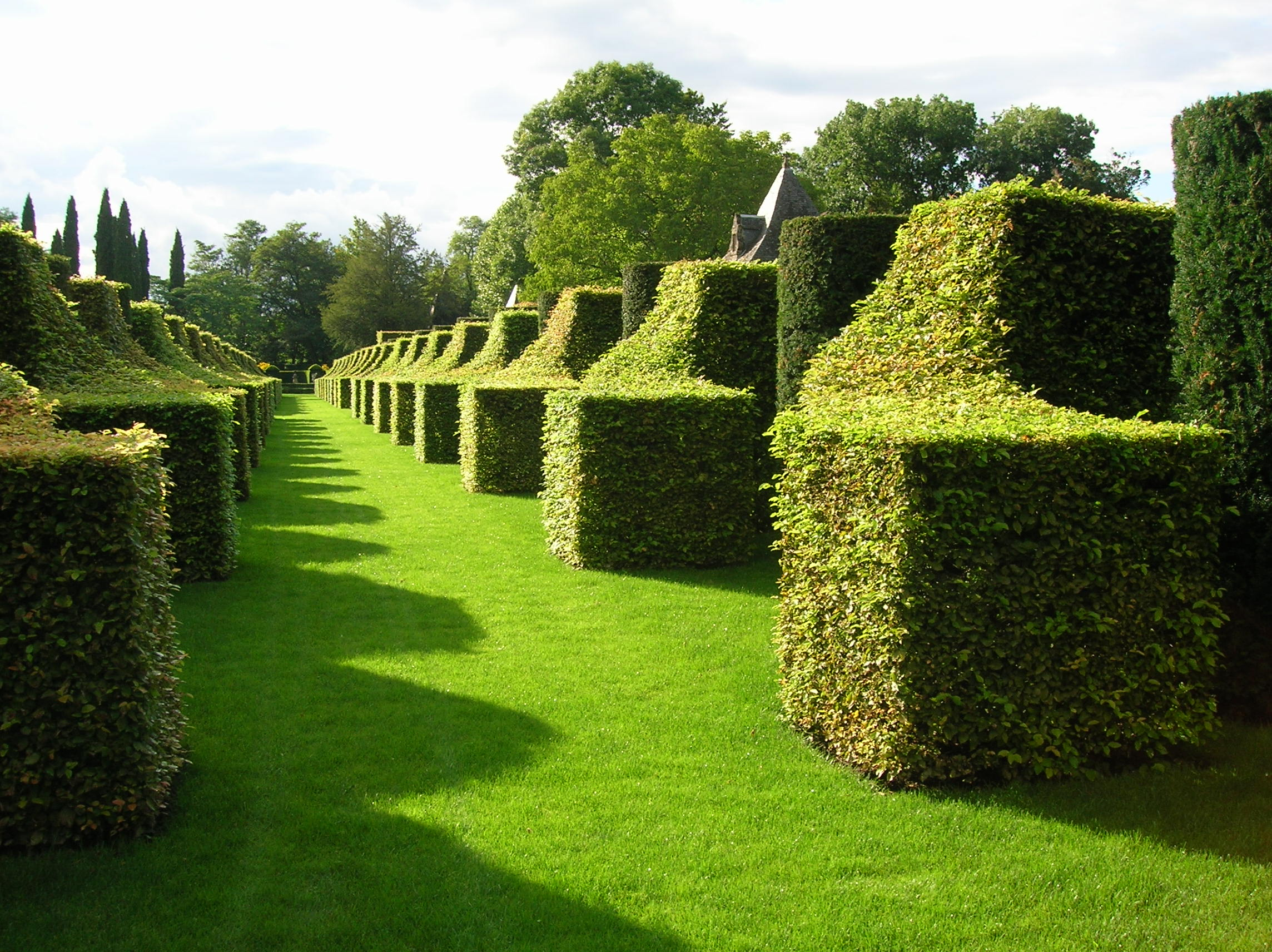
- Eyrignac manor garden

- Coat of arms
- Location of Salignac-Eyvigues
- Location within France Location within Nouvelle-Aquitaine
- Coordinates: 44°58′31″N 1°19′24″E
- Country: France
- Region: Nouvelle-Aquitaine
- Department: Dordogne
- Arrondissement: Sarlat-la-Canéda
- Canton: Terrasson-Lavilledieu

Government
  - Mayor (2021–2026): Jacques Ferber
- Area^{1}: 45.00 km^{2} (17.37 sq mi)
- Elevation: 280 m (920 ft)
- Highest elevation: 314 m (1,030 ft)
- Lowest elevation: 120 m (390 ft)
- Population (2023): 1,184
  - Density: 26.31/km^{2} (68.15/sq mi)
- Time zone: UTC+01:00 (CET)
  - Summer (DST): UTC+02:00 (CEST)
- INSEE/Postal code: 24516 /24590
- ^{1} French Land Register data, which excludes lakes, ponds, glaciers > 1 km^{2} (0.386 sq mi or 247 acres) and river estuaries.

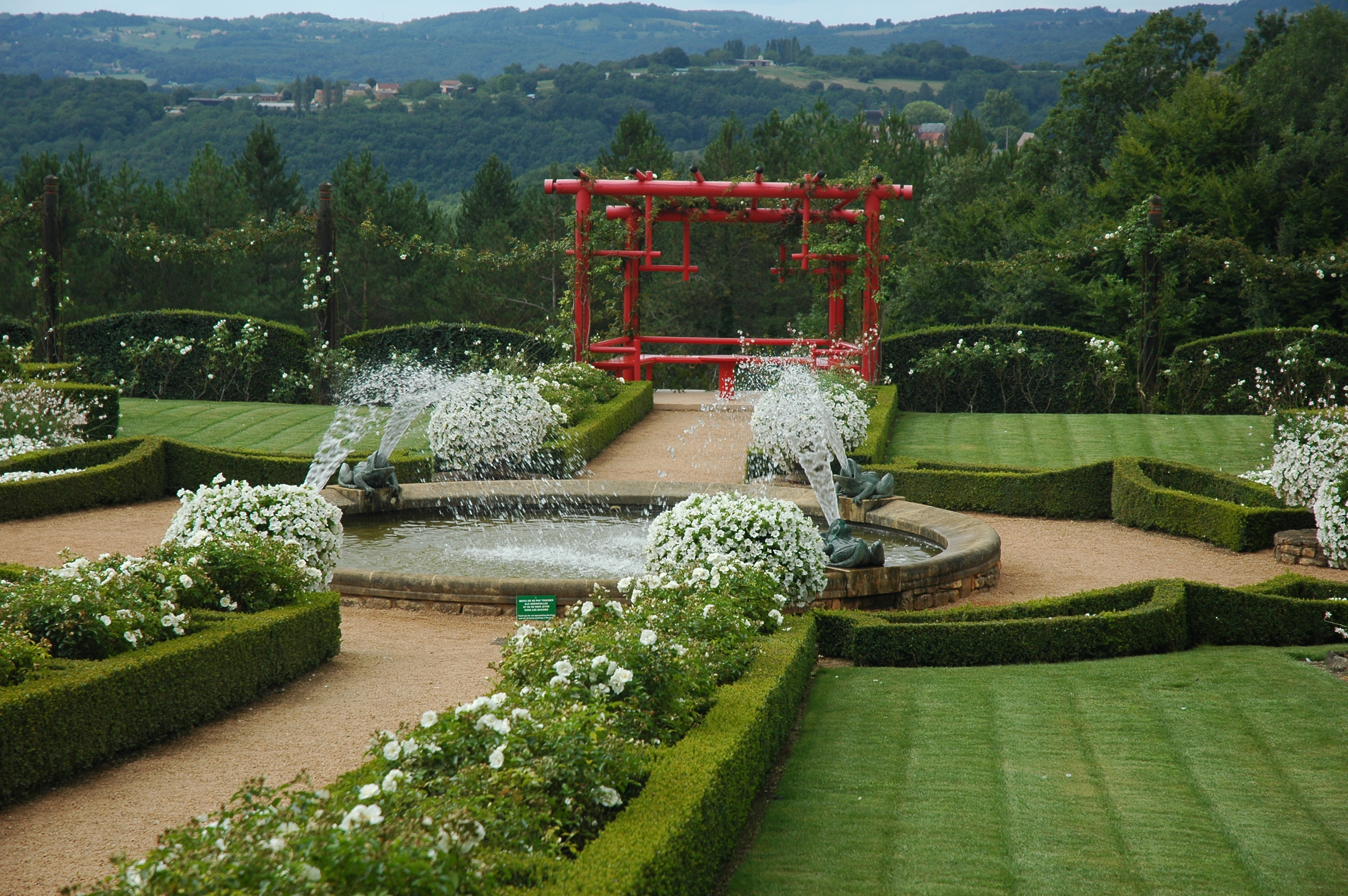
Eyrignac manor garden

Salignac-Eyvigues (French pronunciation: [saliɲak ɛviɡ]; Occitan: Salanhac e Aivigas) is a commune in the Dordogne department in Nouvelle-Aquitaine in southwestern France.

It includes the 17th century Eyrignac Manor (French: Manoir d'Eyrignac), which has a remarkable garden, originally established in the 18th century, surrounding the manor house on a hill, with water coming from seven springs. Only a pavilion, fountains and basins remain from the original garden. In the 1960s, the new owner, Giles Sermadiras de Cuzols de Lile, created a new garden, inspired by gardens from the Renaissance and Italian gardens to the end of the 18th century. The garden features topiary sculptures, vistas, fountains, statues, and an avenue of vases.

== Population ==
Historical population
Year	Pop.	±% p.a.
1968	888	—
1975	863	−0.41%
1982	942	+1.26%
1990	964	+0.29%
1999	1,008	+0.50%
2007	1,128	+1.42%
2012	1,157	+0.51%
2017	1,159	+0.03%
2023	1,184	+0.36%
Source: INSEE

== See also ==
- Communes of the Dordogne department
