= Cloud tree =

Tree that is pruned or shaped using topiary techniques

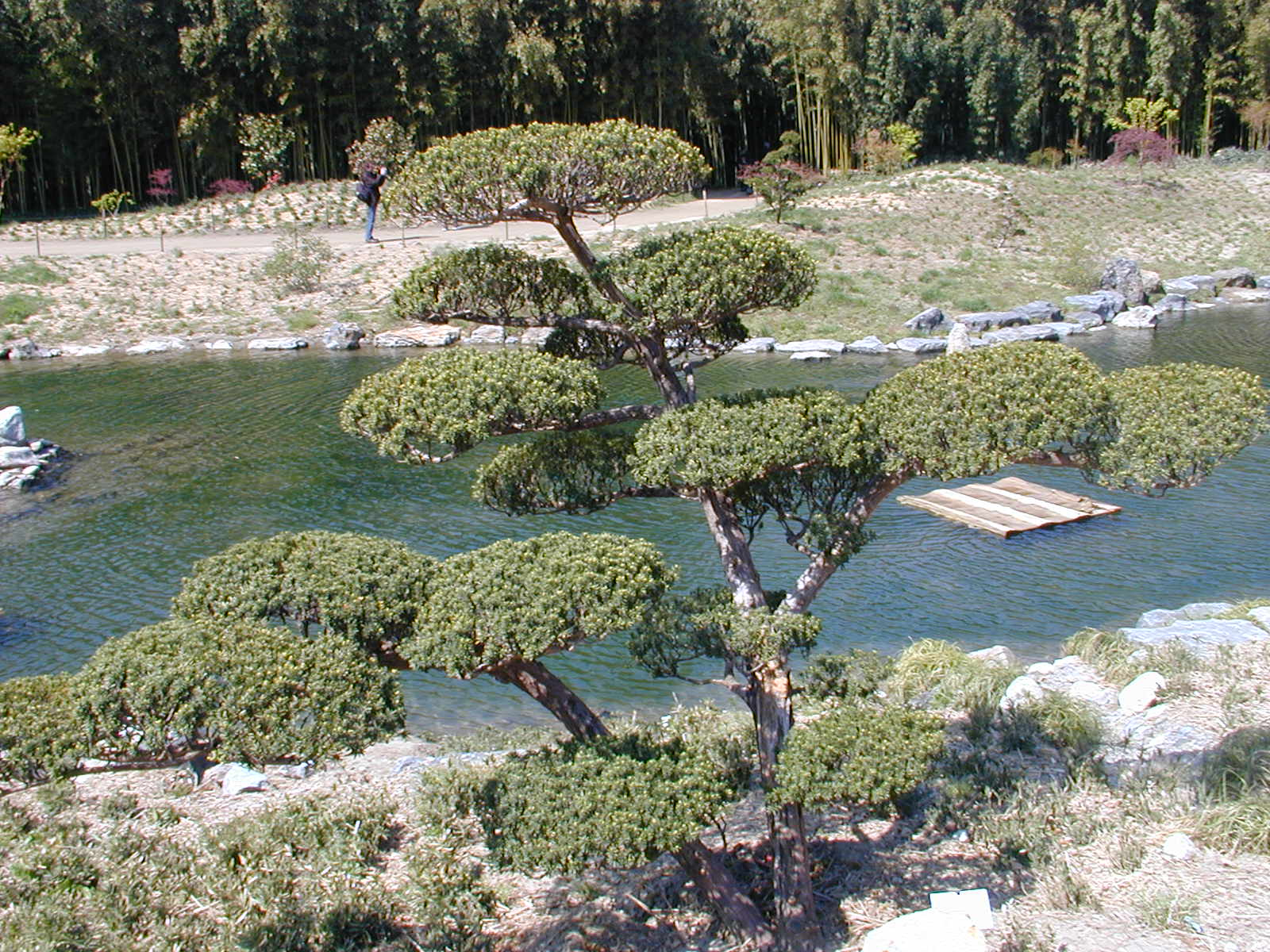

A cloud tree is a tree shaped using topiary techniques. The leaves are pruned into a ball or cloud shape, leaving the stems thin and exposed. The shape of the tree as a whole resembles a set of clouds.

Cloud trees differ from bonsai trees because they are not miniature. Typically, cloud trees are planted in plain soil, rather than in pots.

Similarly to bonsai, the practice of shaping cloud trees comes from Japan, deriving from a Japanese style of gardening known as Niwaki.

== Gallery ==
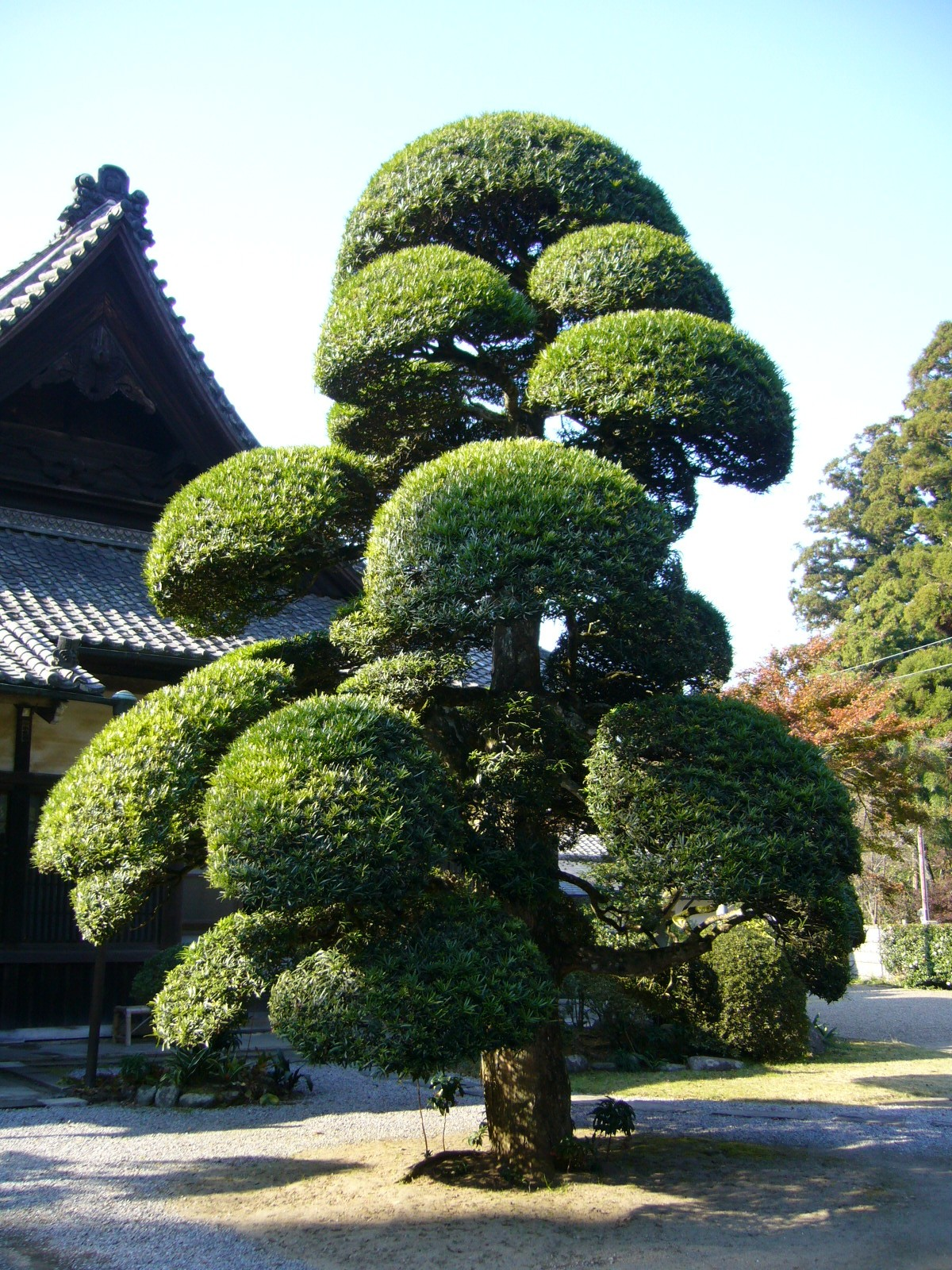

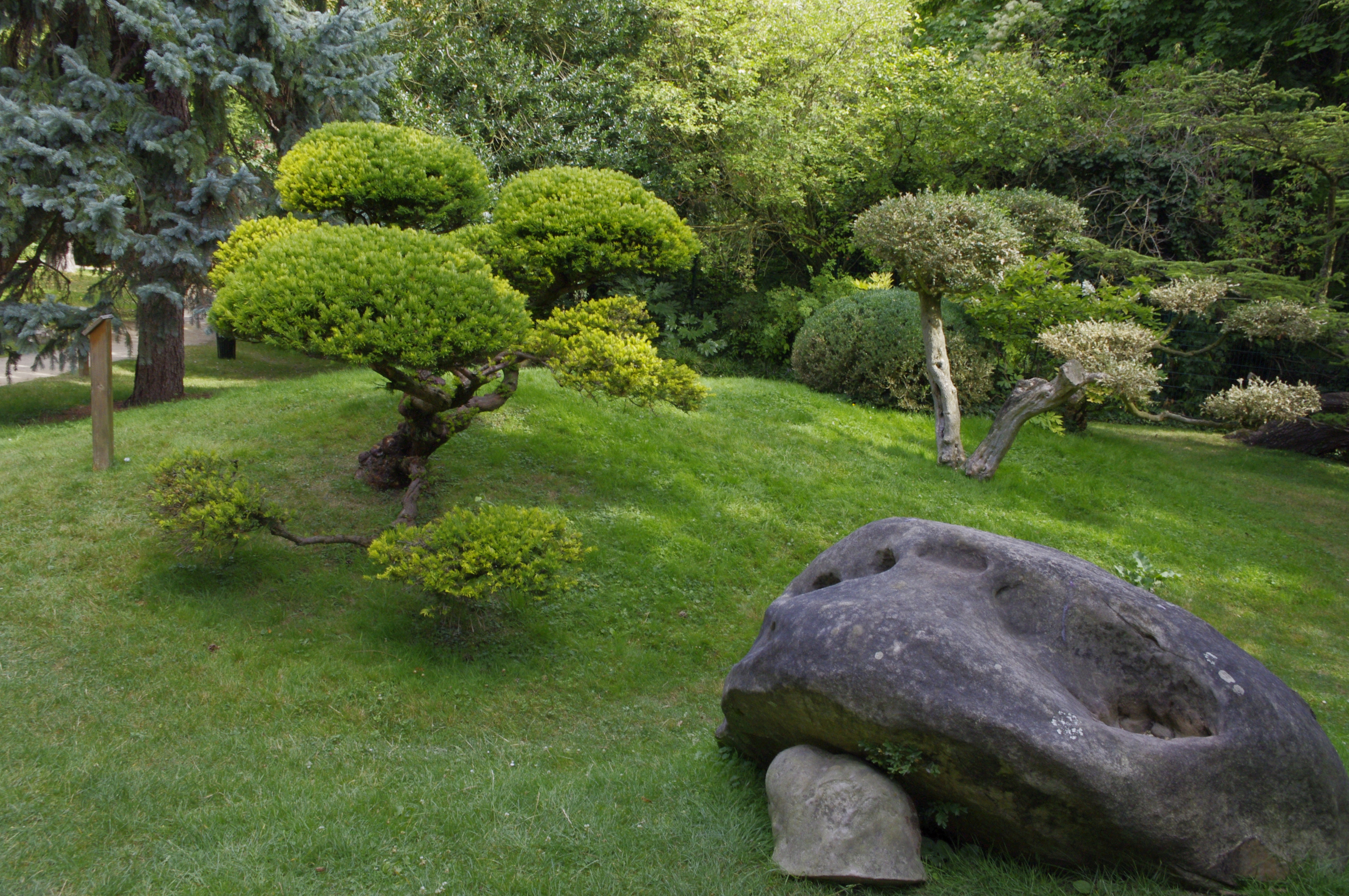

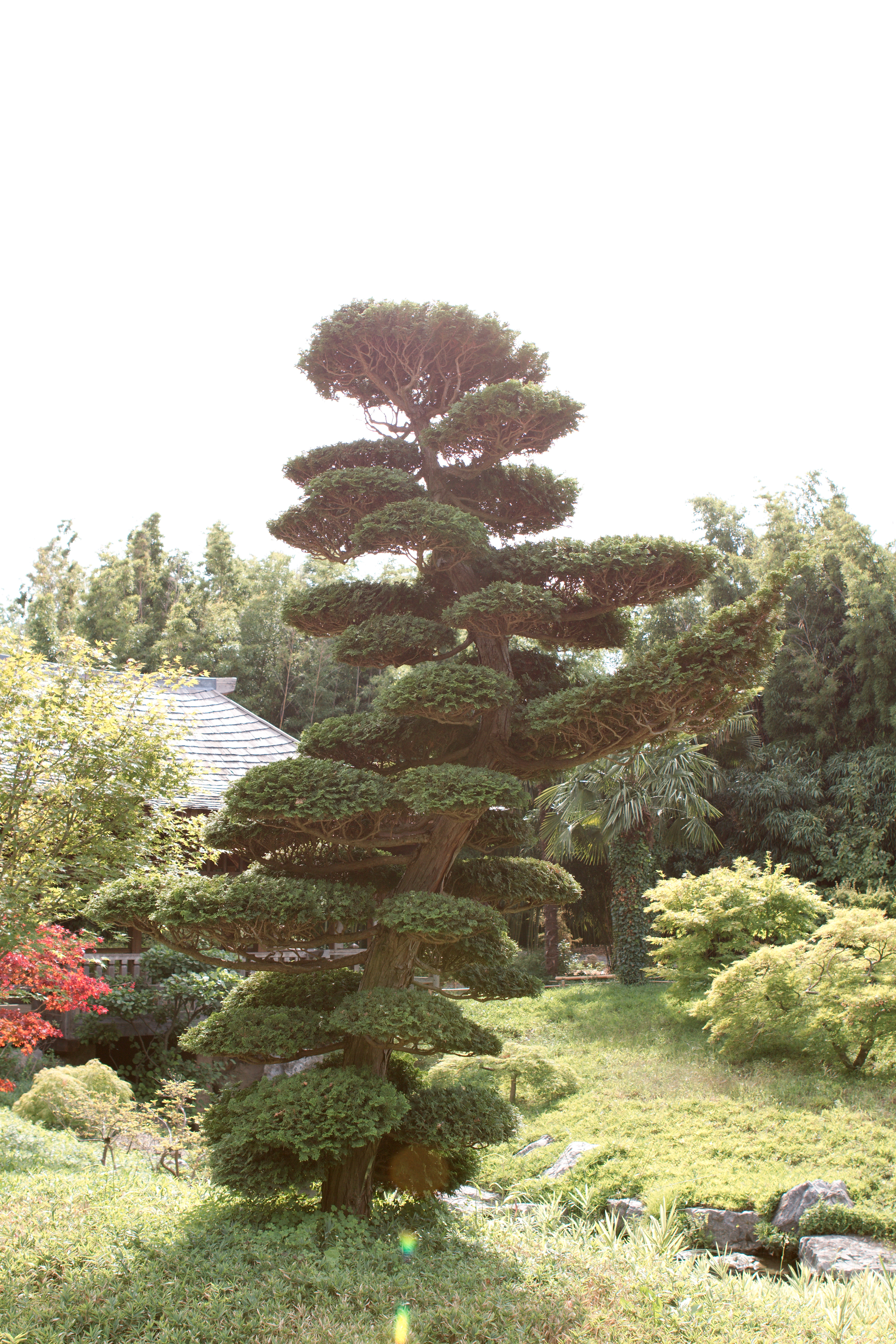

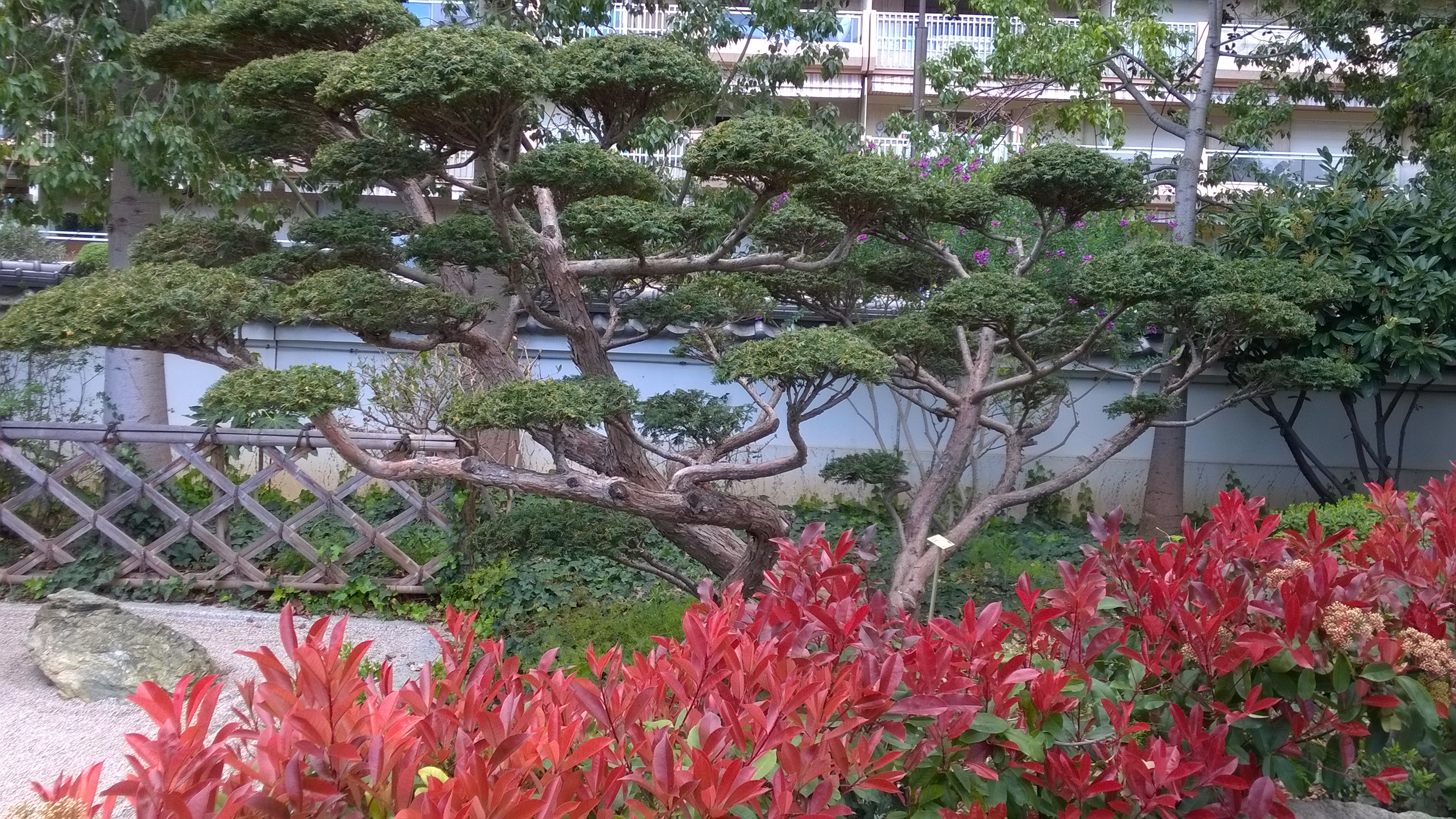

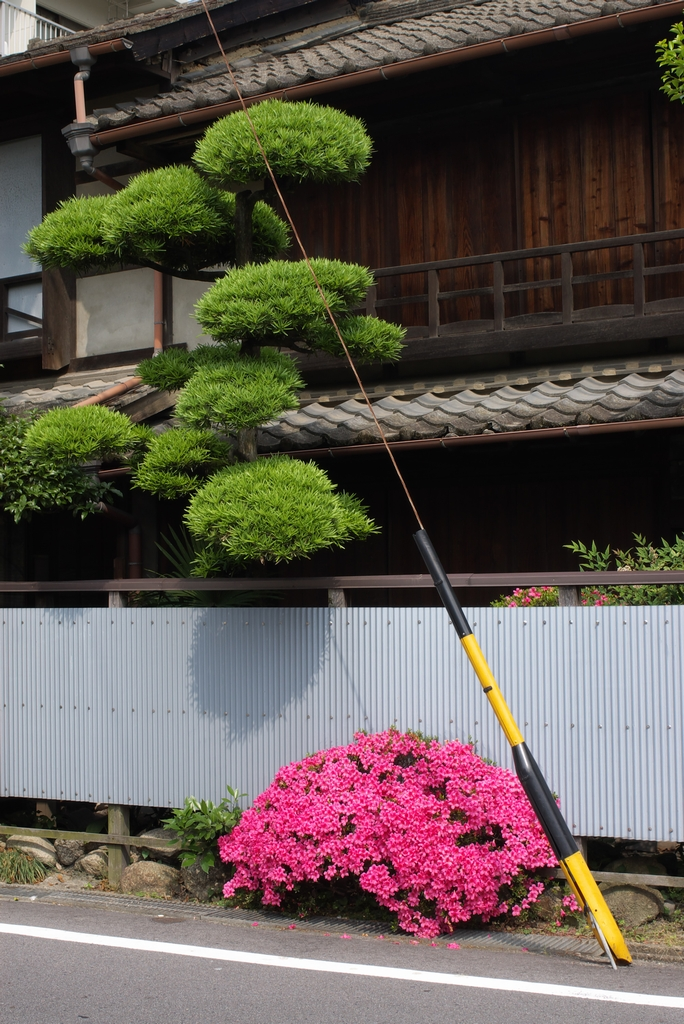

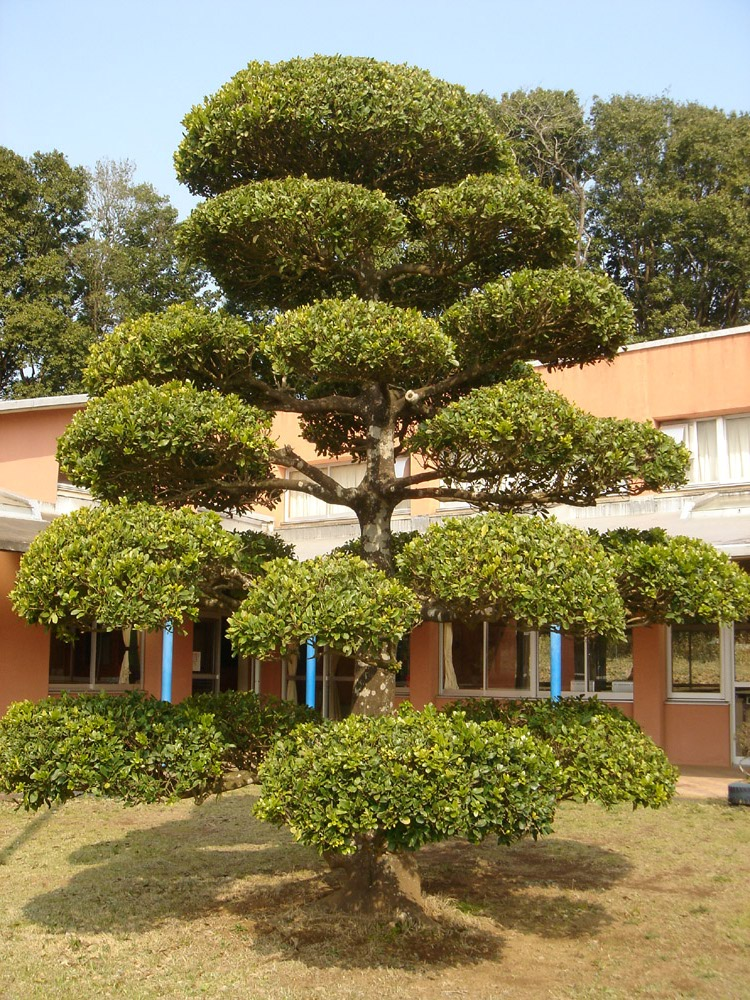

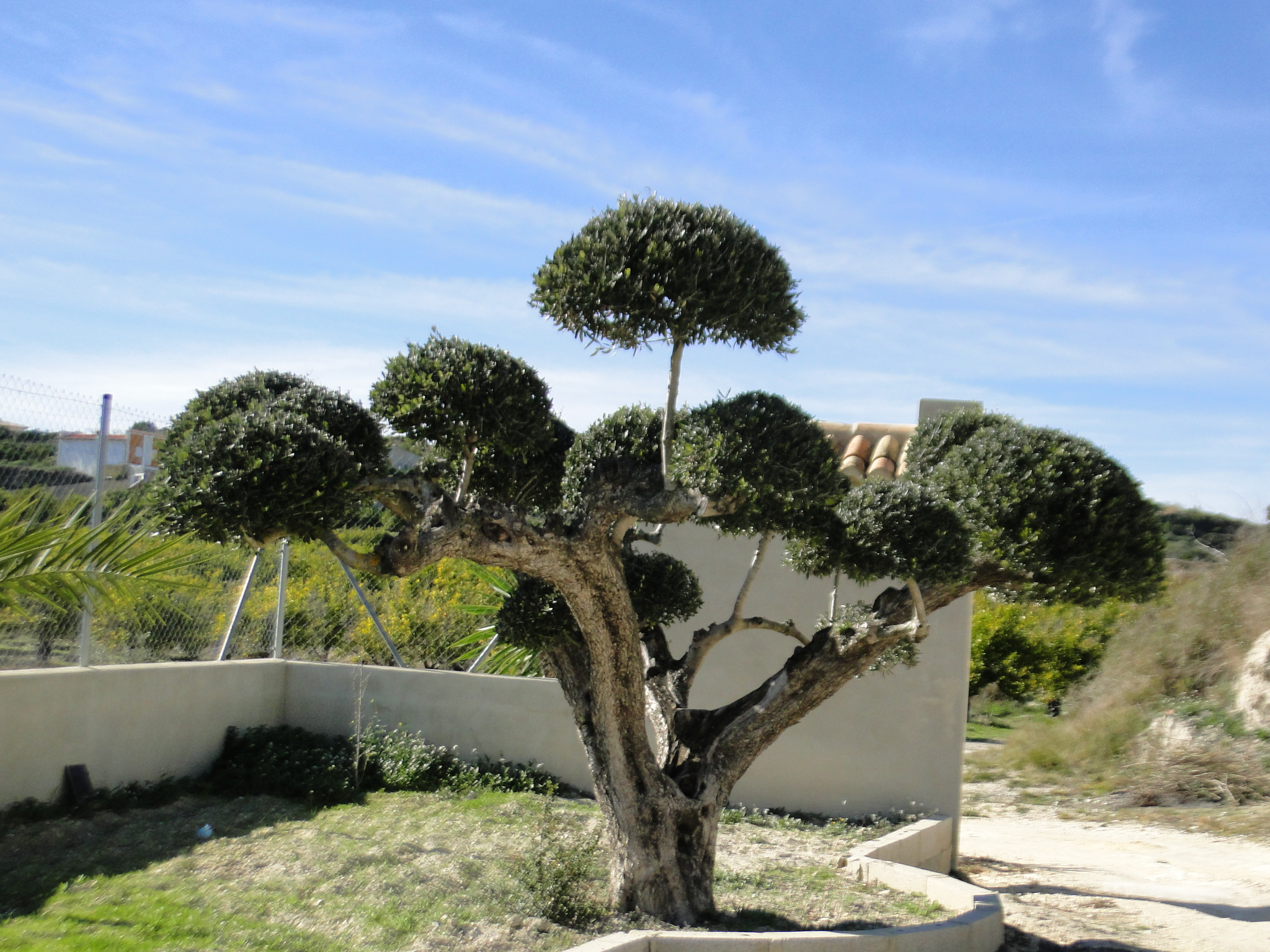

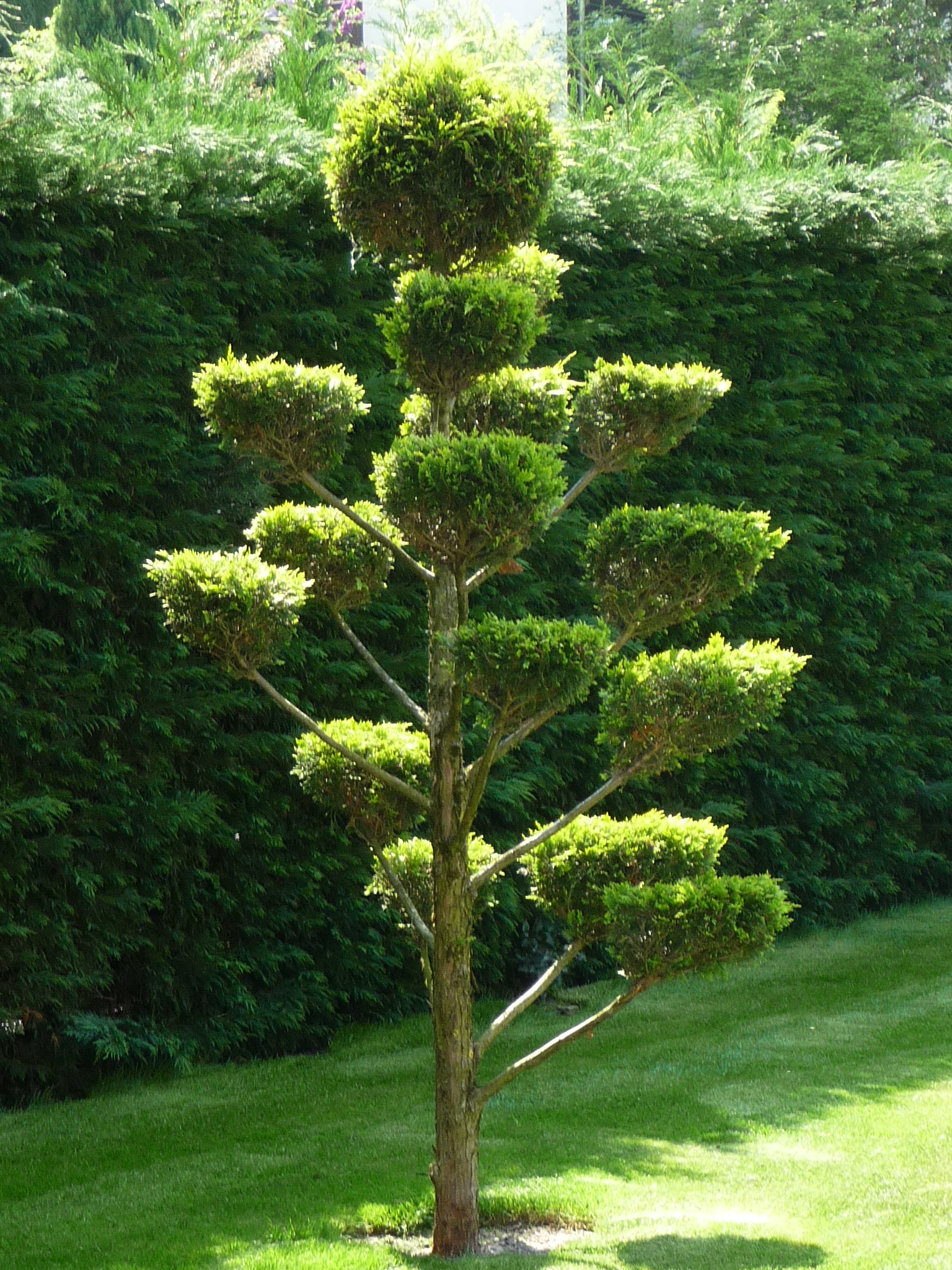

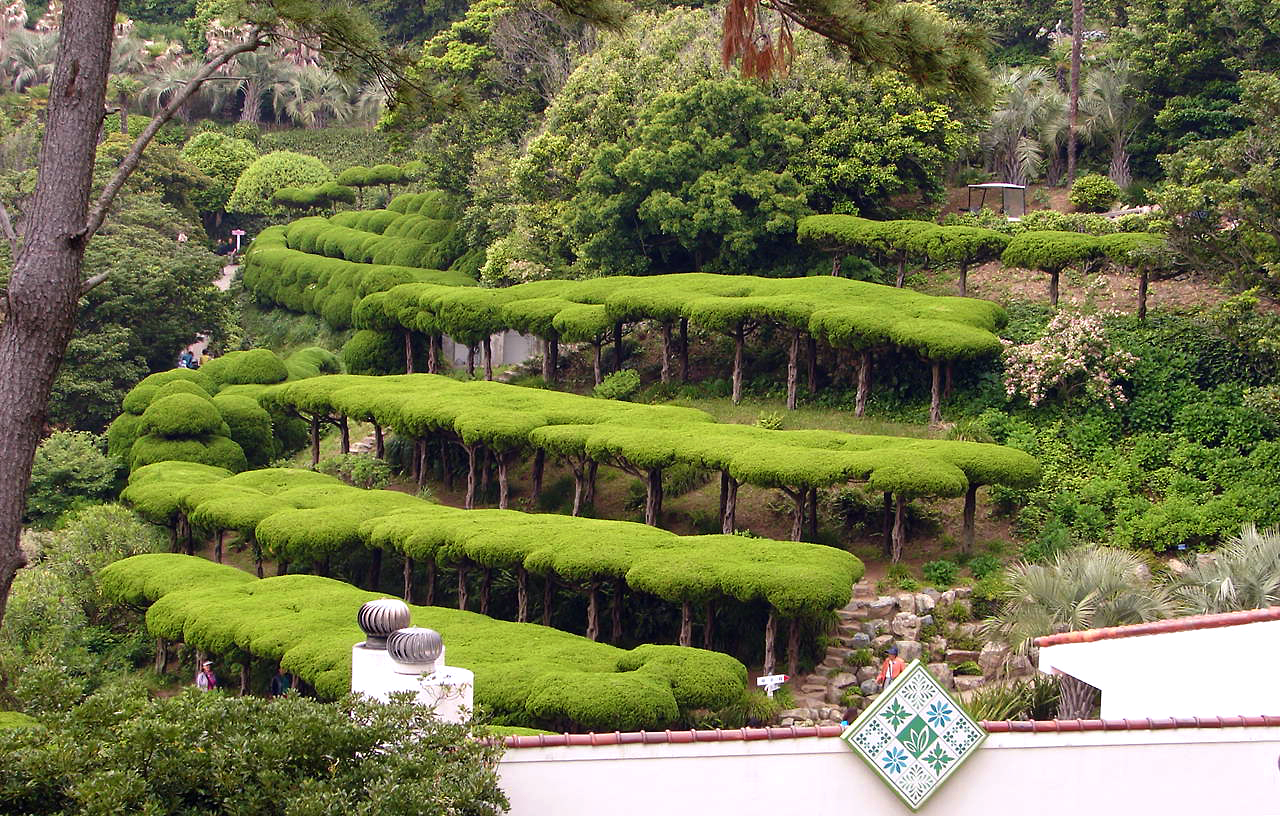

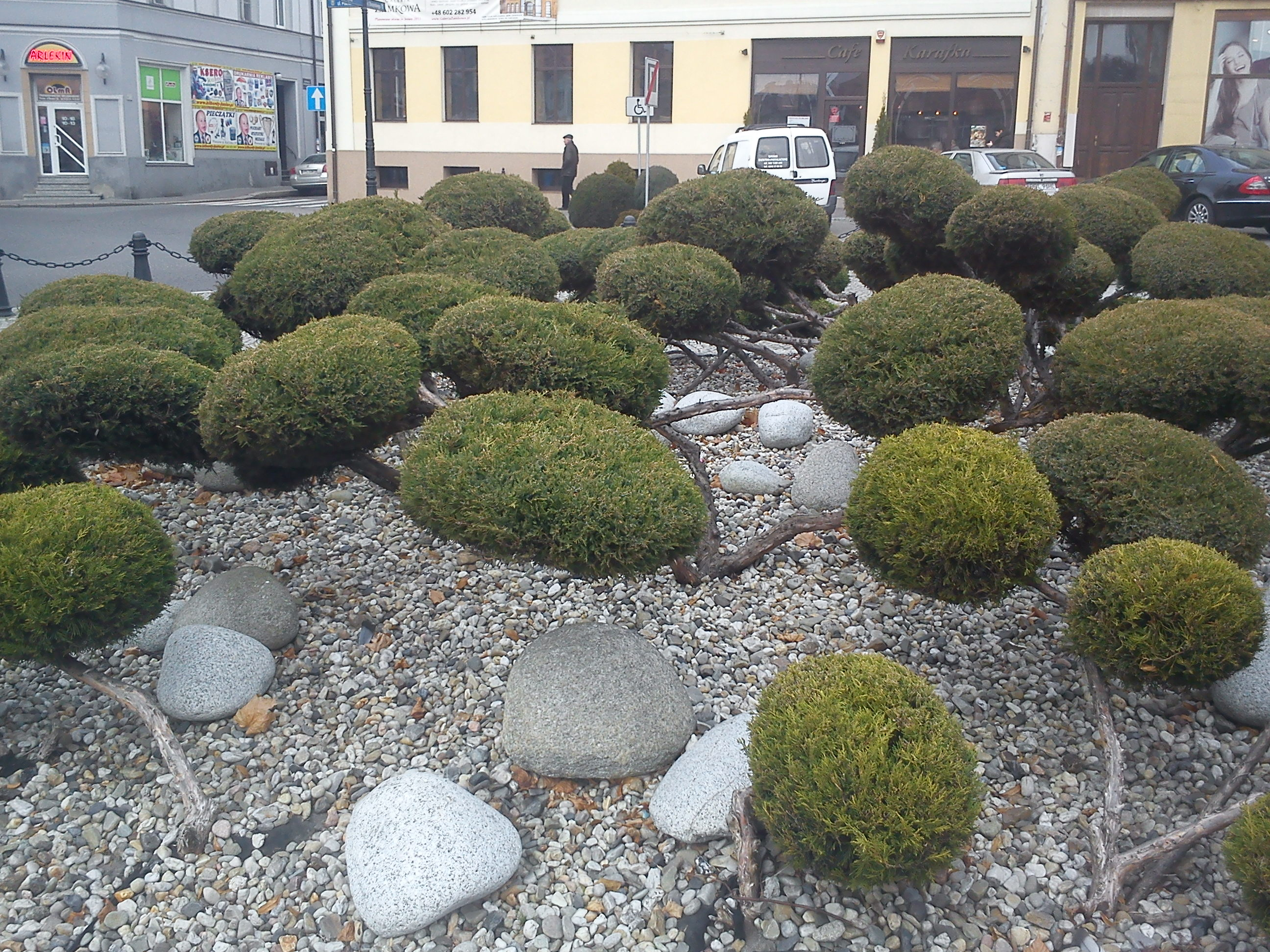
