= Bibliography of hedges and topiary =

This is a bibliography of hedges and topiary. It includes works relating to the natural history and botany of the hedgerow as well as works relating to the horticultural practice of the creation of topiary, and works relating to the cultivation of Buxus, a plant commonly used to create hedges.

== Boxwood ==
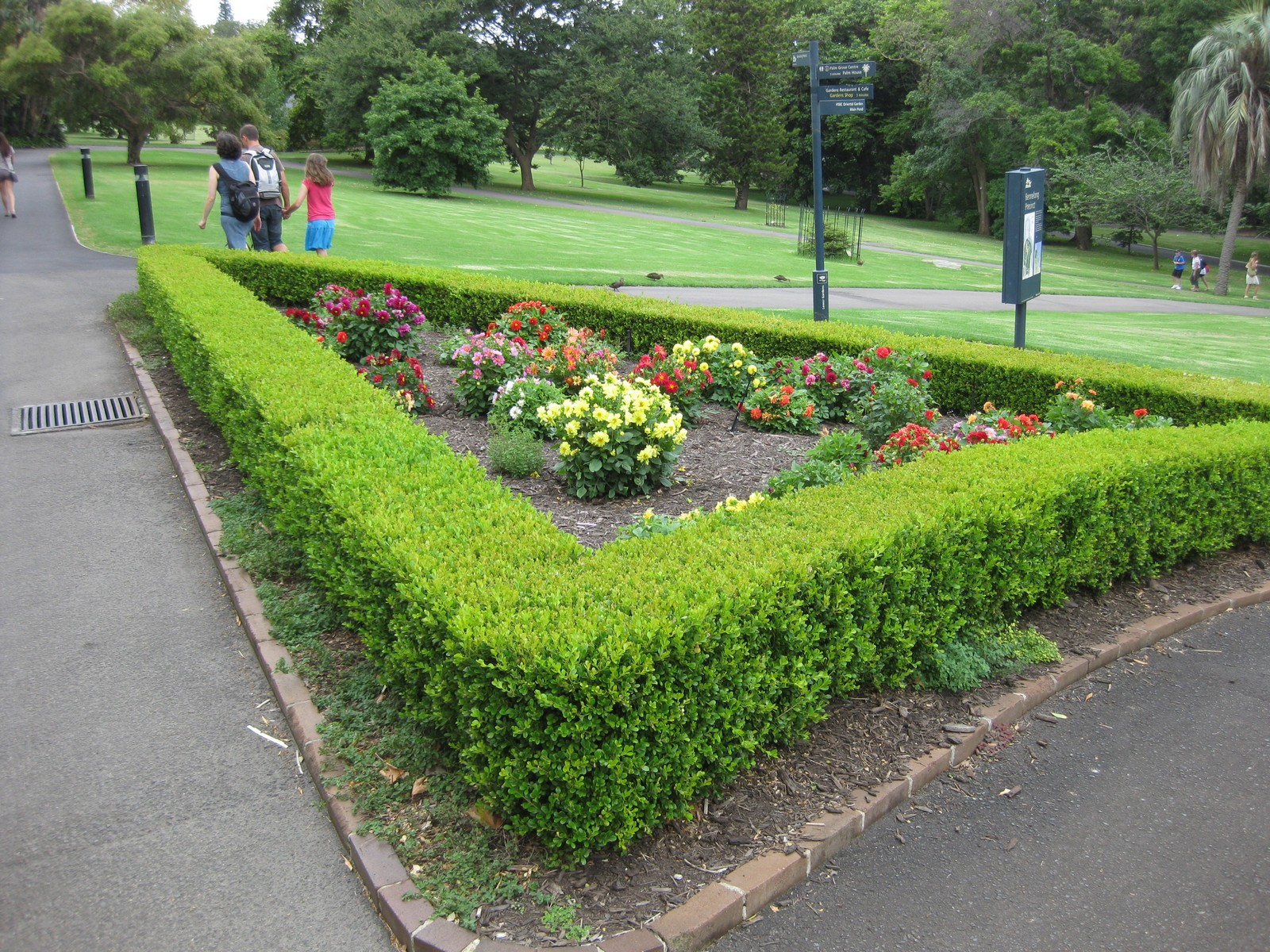
Ornamental Buxus hedge

- Adams, Katharina. (2004) Buchs. Stuttgart: Kosmos Garten. ISBN 3440097978.
- Batdorf, Lynn. (2003) Caring For Box. Rye: Sage Press. ISBN 0954229746.
- — (2004) Boxwood – An Illustrated Encyclopedia. Boyce, Virginia: The American Boxwood Society. ISBN 1886833257.
- — (2005) Boxwood Handbook – A practical guide to knowing and growing boxwood. 3rd edition. Boyce, Virginia: The American Boxwood Society. ISBN 9781886833012.

== Hedgerows ==
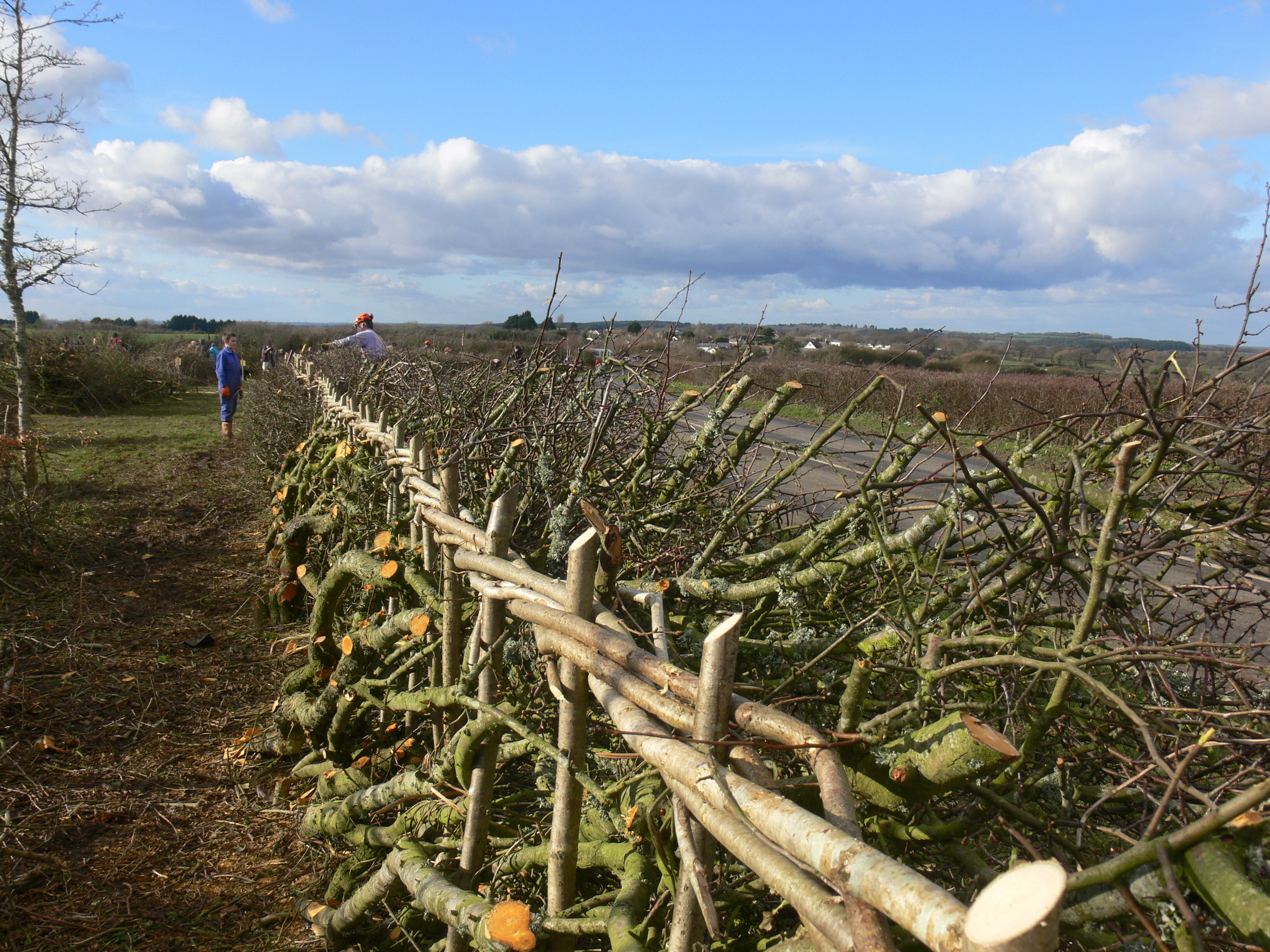
Newly-laid hedge in Newbridge, Isle of Wight, in Midland style. Taken at the Isle of Wight Hedgelaying Competition 2011.

- Barker, Hugh. (2012) Hedge Britannia: A Curious History of a British Obsession. London: Bloomsbury. ISBN 9781408801864.
- Croxton P.J., Franssen W., Myhill D.G. & Sparks T.H. (2004) "The restoration of neglected hedges: a comparison of management treatments", Biological Conservation, 117, 19-23.
- Pollard, E. et al. (1974) Hedges. William Collins.
- White, John Talbot. (1980) Hedgerow. Ash & Grant, London. Illustrated by Eric Thomas. ISBN 0904069397. Later editions Dorling Kindersley.
- Wright, John. (2016) A Natural History of the Hedgerow and Ditches, Dykes and Dry Stone Walls. London: Profile. ISBN 9781846685521.

== Topiary ==
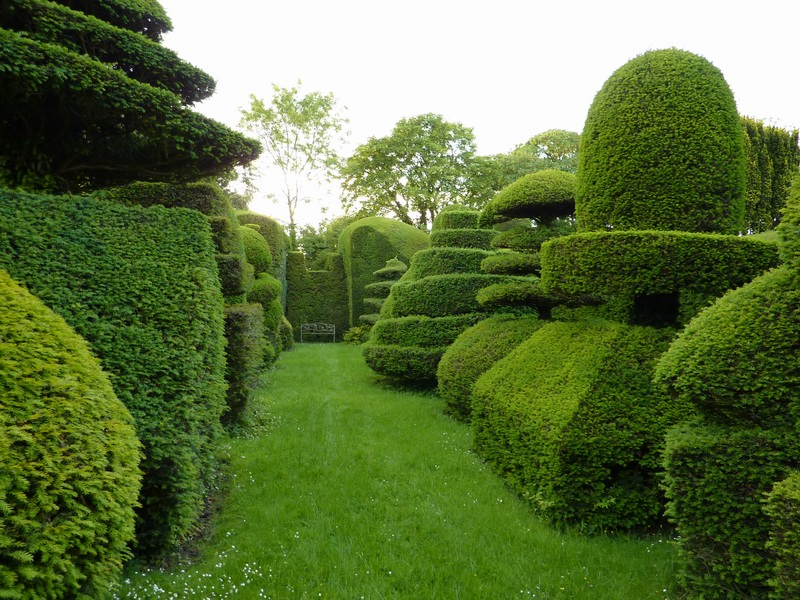
Topiary at Beckley Park, England.

- Baker, Margaret. (1982) Discovering Topiary. Tring: Shire Publications. ISBN 0852630190.
- Blanke, Rolf. (1997) Kunstwerke in Grün (Artwork in Green) Ulmer: Stuttgart. ISBN 3800166291.
- Brooklyn Botanic Garden. (1968) Plants and Gardens Handbook 36: Trained and Sculptured Plants. New York: Brooklyn Botanic Garden.
- Carr, David. (1989) Topiary and Plant Sculpture: A beginner's step-by-step guide. Marlborough: Crowood. ISBN 1852231483.
- Clarke, Ethne & George Wright. (1988) English Topiary Gardens. London: Weidenfeld and Nicolson. ISBN 0297792989.
- Curtis, Charles and W. Gibson. (1904) The Book of Topiary.
- Hadfield, Miles. (1971) Topiary and Ornamental Hedges: Their history and cultivation. London: A & C Black.
- Lloyd, Nathaniel. (1925) Topiary: Garden Art in Yew and Box. London: Ernest Benn.
