= Topiary =

Horticultural practice to shape trees and shrubs

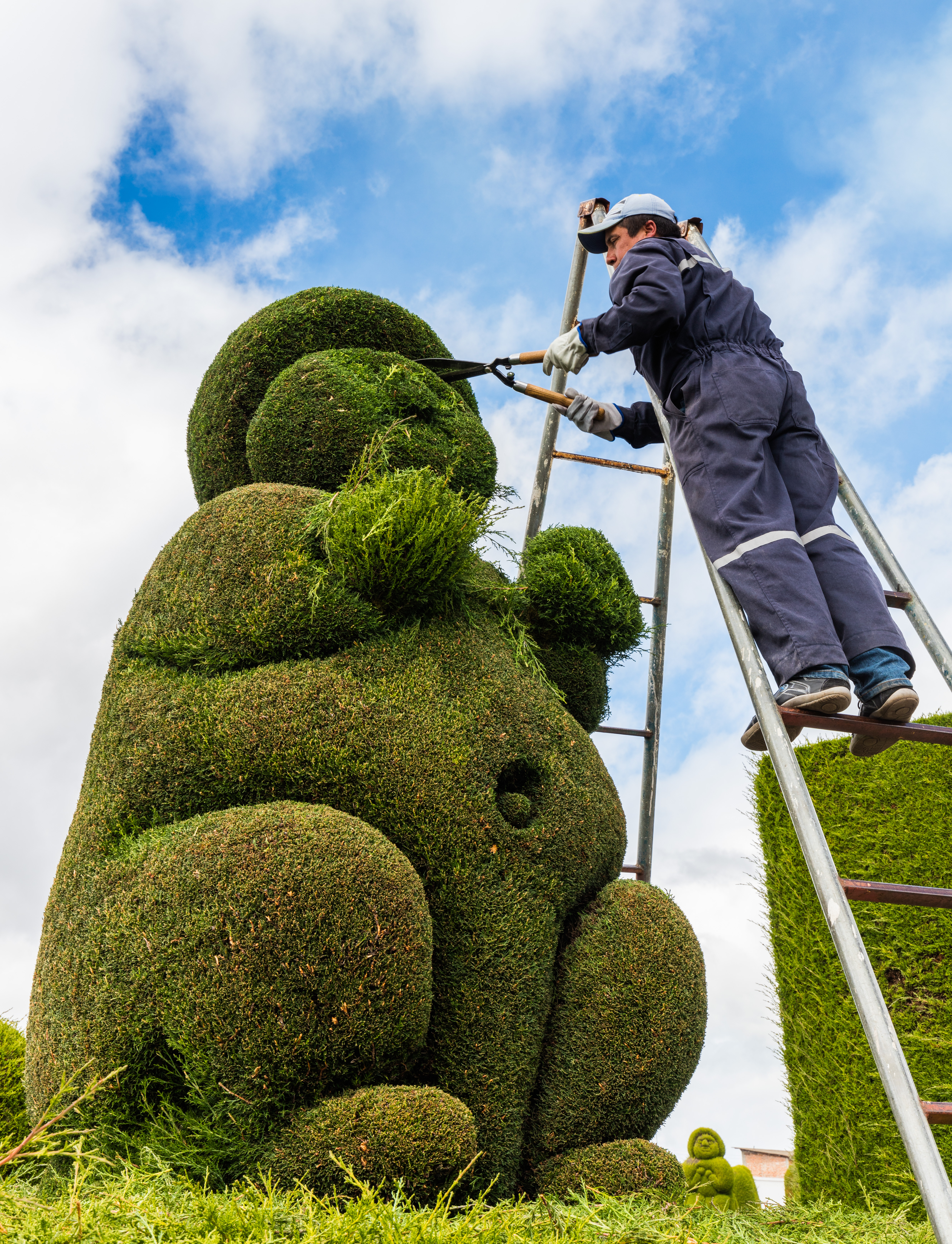
Topiary animal in Tulcán, Ecuador

Topiary is the horticultural practice of training perennial plants by clipping the foliage and twigs of trees, shrubs and subshrubs to develop and maintain clearly defined shapes, whether geometric or fanciful. The term also refers to plants which have been shaped in this way. As an art form it is a type of living sculpture. The word derives from the Latin word for an ornamental landscape gardener, topiarius, a creator of topia or "places", a Greek word that Romans also applied to fictive indoor landscapes executed in fresco.

The plants used in topiary are evergreen, mostly woody, have small leaves or needles, produce dense foliage, and have compact or columnar (e.g., fastigiate) growth habits. Common species chosen for topiary include cultivars of European box (Buxus sempervirens), arborvitae (Thuja species), bay laurel (Laurus nobilis), holly (Ilex species), myrtle (Eugenia or Myrtus species), yew (Taxus species), and privet (Ligustrum species). Shaped wire cages are sometimes employed in modern topiary to guide untutored shears, but traditional topiary depends on patience and a steady hand; small-leaved ivy can be used to cover a cage and give the look of topiary in a few months. The hedge is a simple form of topiary used to create boundaries, walls or screens.

== History ==
=== Origin ===
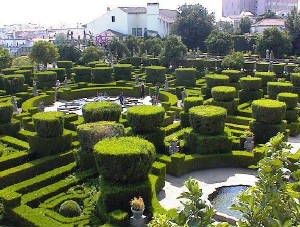
Castelo Branco Portugal

European topiary dates from Roman times. Pliny's Natural History and the epigram writer Martial both credit Gaius Matius Calvinus, in the circle of Julius Caesar, with introducing the first topiary to Roman gardens, and Pliny the Younger describes in a letter the elaborate figures of animals, inscriptions, cyphers and obelisks in clipped greens at his Tuscan villa (Epistle v.6, to Apollinaris). Within the atrium of a Roman house or villa, a place that had formerly been quite plain, the art of the topiarius produced a miniature landscape (topos) which might employ the art of stunting trees, also mentioned, disapprovingly, by Pliny the Elder (Historia Naturalis xii.6).

=== East Asian topiary ===
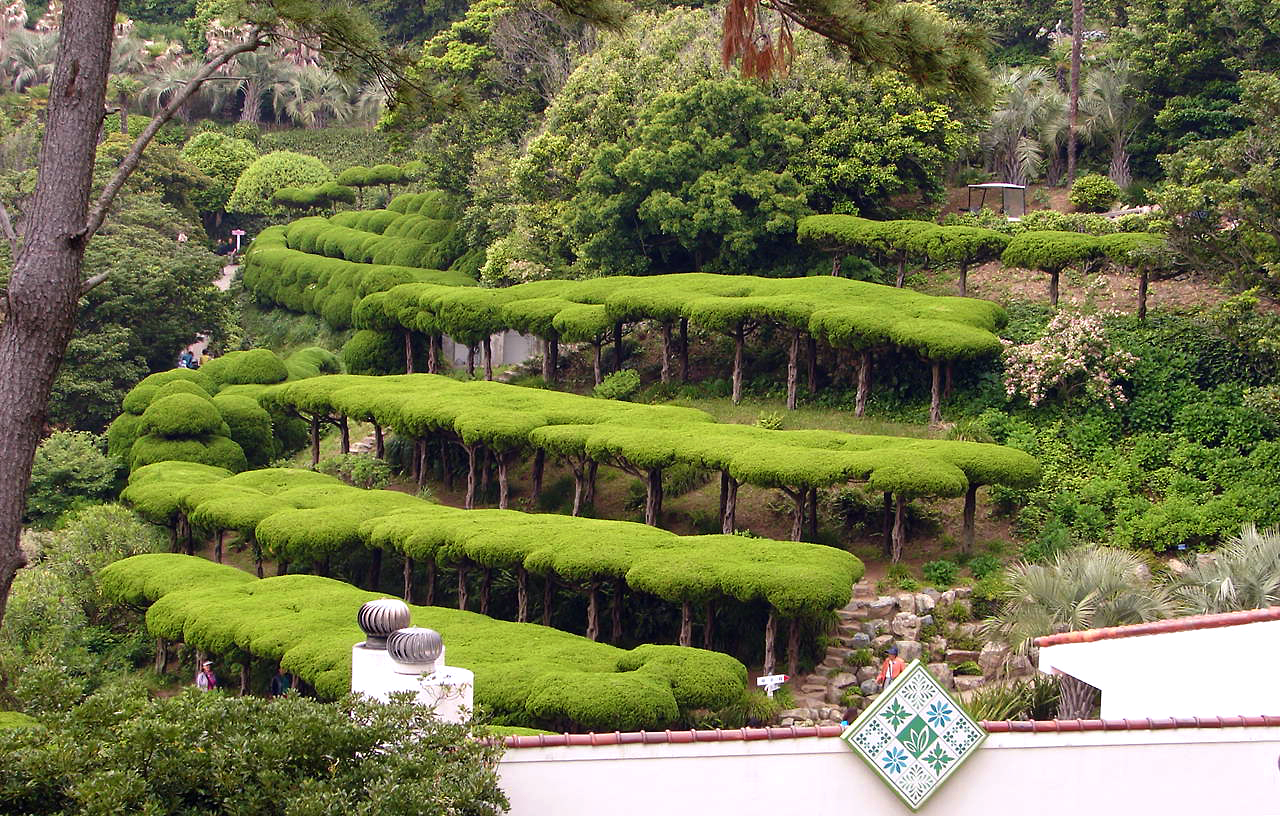
Cloud-pruning only distantly related to natural forms in Hallyeo Haesang National Park, Geoje, South Korea

The clipping and shaping of shrubs and trees in China and Japan have been practised with equal rigor, but for different reasons. The goal is to achieve an artful expression of the "natural" form of venerably aged pines, given character by the forces of wind and weather. Their most concentrated expressions are in the related arts of Chinese penjing and Japanese bonsai.

Japanese cloud-pruning is closest to the European art: the cloud-like forms of clipped growth are designed to be best appreciated after a fall of snow. Japanese Zen gardens (karesansui, dry rock gardens) make extensive use of Karikomi (a topiary technique of clipping shrubs and trees into large curved shapes or sculptures) and Hako-zukuri (shrubs clipped into boxes and straight lines).

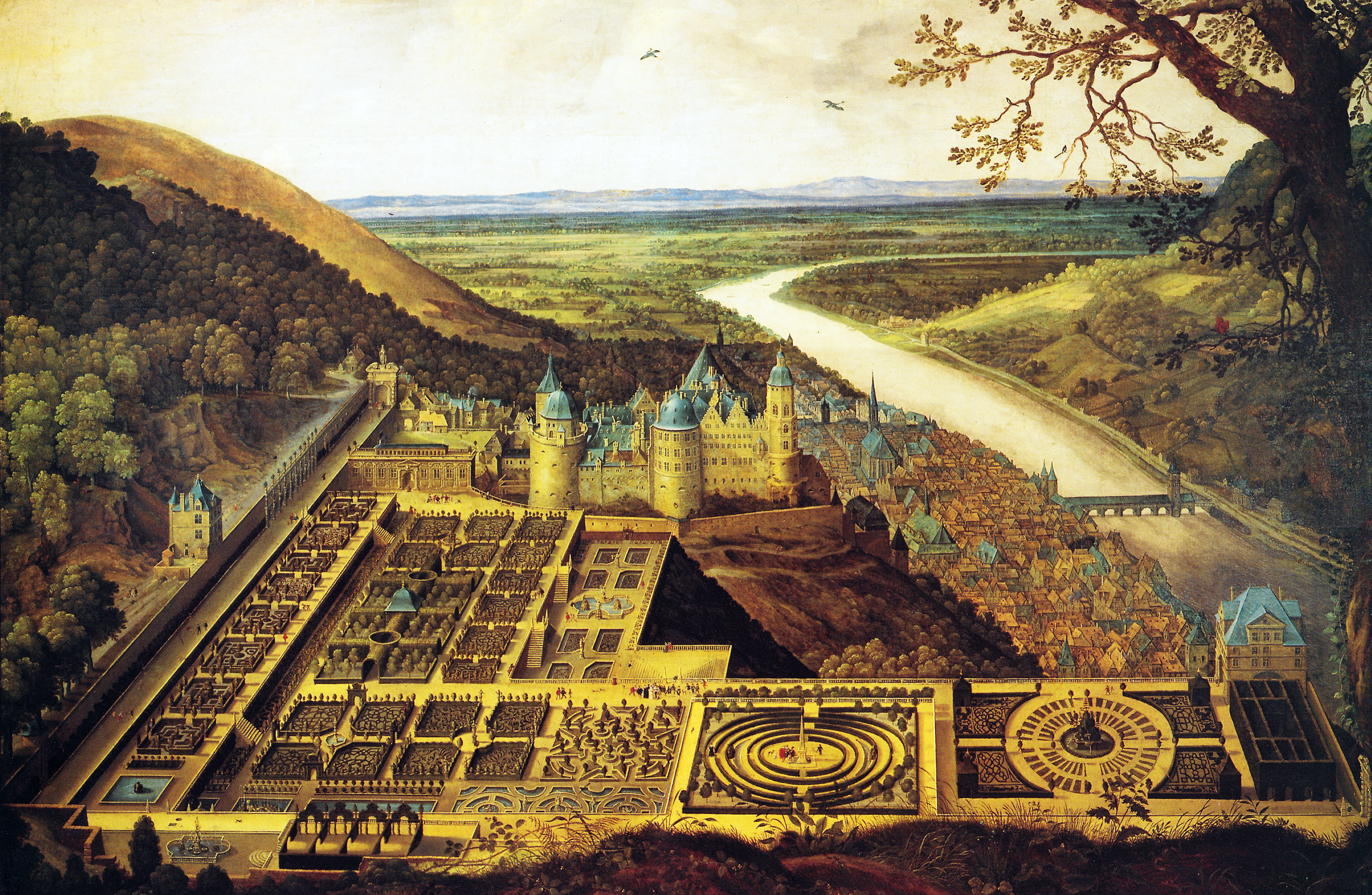
Simple upright topiary shapes punctuate the patterned parterres of Heidelberg c. 1590, in this view by Jacques Fouquiere

=== Renaissance topiary ===
In the 1550s and throughout Elizabeth I’s reign, topiary gardens grew in popularity. Knot gardens, formed from interlacing box hedges and aromatic herbs, featured square, symmetrical designs inspired by household patterns such as carpets and embroidery.

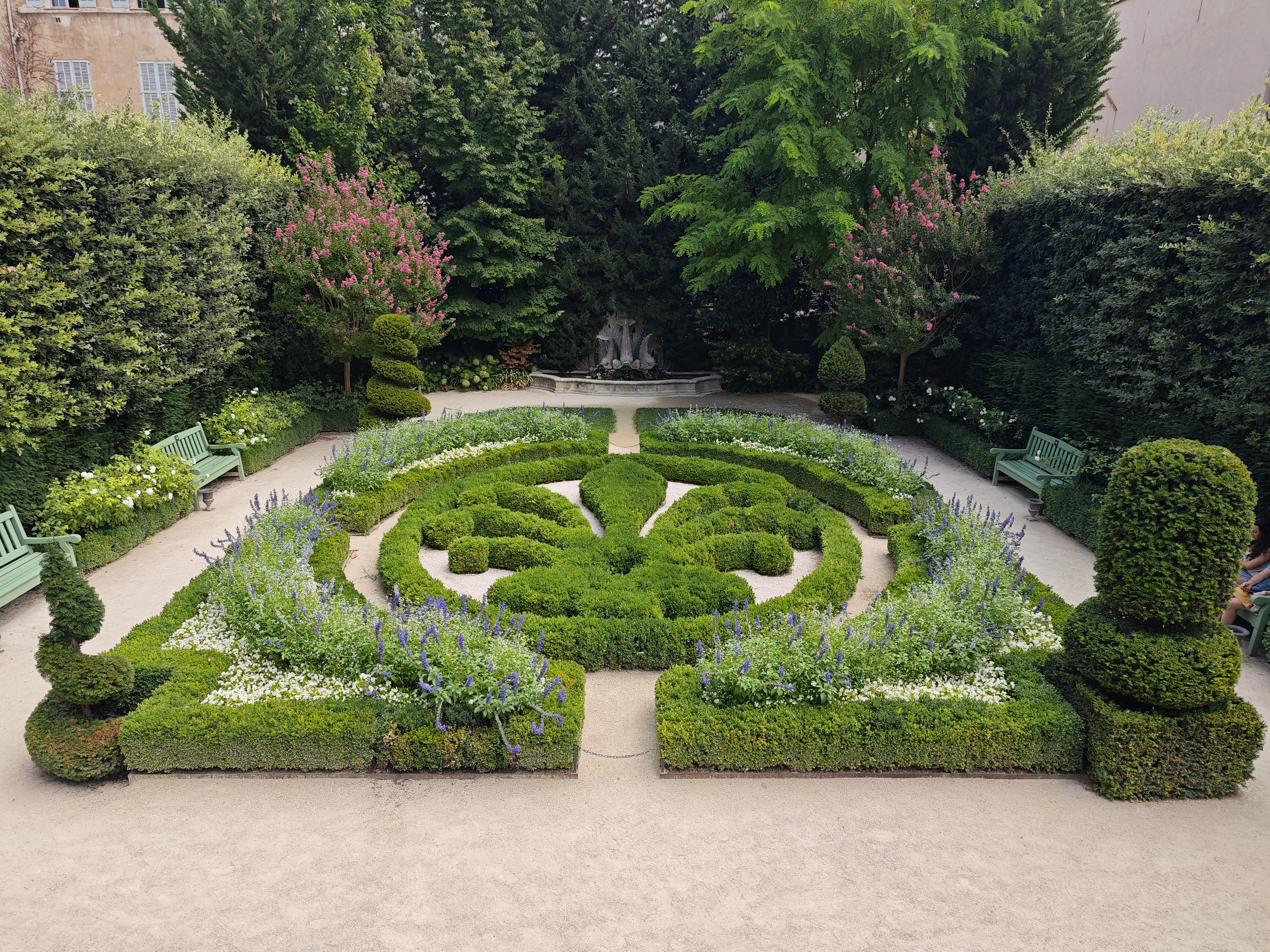
Formal parterre topiary at Hôtel de Caumont

During the Italian Renaissance, gardens emphasized symmetry and proportion. The parterre developed from the knot garden, featuring clipped shrubs and statues arranged within geometric box-hedged patterns and became a central feature of formal European gardens. French designers expanded these ideas to grander scales, as seen in André Le Nôtre’s work at Versailles. Dutch gardeners became known for intricate geometric and figurative designs and exported their techniques across Europe. By this time, topiary appeared in both formal estates and cottage gardens.

Around 1578, Barnaby Googe noted that women were clipping rosemary "as in the fashion of a cart, a peacock, or such things as they fancy." In 1618 William Lawson suggested:

Your gardener can frame your lesser wood to the shape of men armed in the field, ready to give battell: or swift-running Grey Houndes to chase the Deere, or hunt the Hare. This kind of hunting shall not wate your corne, nor much your coyne.

=== Decline in the 1700s ===
Levens Hall's Elizabethan topiary in 1833

In England topiary was all but killed as a fashion by the famous satiric essay on "Verdant Sculpture" that Alexander Pope published in the short-lived newspaper The Guardian, 29 September 1713, with its mock catalogue descriptions of

- Adam and Eve in yew; Adam a little shattered by the fall of the tree of knowledge in the great storm; Eve and the serpent very flourishing.
- The tower of Babel, not yet finished.
- St George in box; his arm scarce long enough, but will be in condition to stick the dragon by next April.
- A quickset hog, shot up into a porcupine, by its being forgot a week in rainy weather.

In the 1720s and 1730s, the generation of Charles Bridgeman and William Kent swept the English garden clean of its hedges, mazes, and topiary. Although topiary fell from grace in aristocratic gardens, it continued to be featured in cottagers' gardens, where a single example of traditional forms, a ball, a tree trimmed to a cone in several cleanly separated tiers, meticulously clipped and perhaps topped with a topiary peacock, might be passed on as an heirloom. Such an heirloom, but on heroic scale, was the ancient churchward yew of Harlington, London, immortalized in a 1729 engraved broadsheet bearing an illustration with an enthusiastic verse encomium by its dedicated parish clerk and topiarist. formerly shaped as an obelisk on square plinth topped with a ten-foot ball surmounted by a cockerel, the Harlington Yew survives today, untonsured for the last two centuries.

=== Revival ===
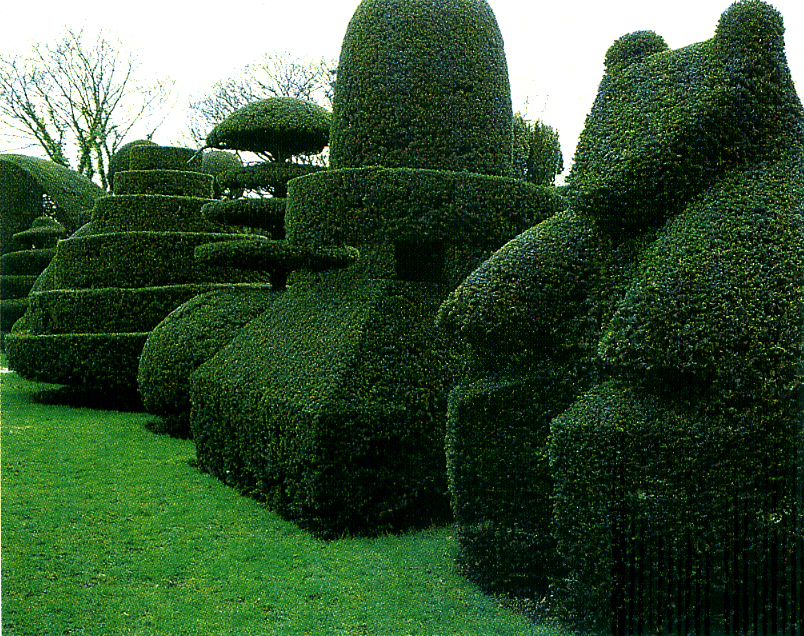
Beckley Park, Oxfordshire: cottage garden topiary formulas taken up in an early 20th-century elite English garden in a historic house setting

The revival of topiary in English gardening parallels the revived "Jacobethan" taste in architecture; John Loudon in the 1840s was the first garden writer to express a sense of loss due to the topiary that had been removed from English gardens. The art of topiary, with enclosed garden "rooms", burst upon the English gardening public with the mature examples at Elvaston Castle, Derbyshire, which opened to public viewing in the 1850s and created a sensation: "within a few years architectural topiary was springing up all over the country (it took another 25 years before sculptural topiary began to become popular as well)". The following generation, represented by James Shirley Hibberd, rediscovered the charm of topiary specimens as part of the mystique of the "English cottage garden", which was as much invented as revived from the 1870s:

It may be true, as I believe it is, that the natural form of a tree is the most beautiful possible for that tree, but it may happen that we do not want the most beautiful form, but one of our own designing, and expressive of our ingenuity

The classic statement of the British Arts and Crafts revival of topiary among roses and mixed herbaceous borders, characterised generally as "the old-fashioned garden" or the "Dutch garden" was to be found in Topiary: Garden Craftsmanship in Yew and Box by Nathaniel Lloyd (1867–1933), who had retired in middle age and taken up architectural design with the encouragement of Sir Edwin Lutyens. Lloyd's own timber-framed manor house, Great Dixter, Sussex, remains an epitome of this stylised mix of topiary with "cottagey" plantings that was practised by Gertrude Jekyll and Edwin Lutyens in a fruitful partnership. The new gardening vocabulary incorporating topiary required little expensive restructuring: "At Lyme Park, Cheshire, the garden went from being an Italian garden to being a Dutch garden without any change actually taking place on the ground," Brent Elliot noted in 2000.

Americans in England were sensitive to the renewed charms of topiary. When William Waldorf Astor bought Hever Castle, Kent, around 1906, the moat surrounding the house precluded the addition of wings for servants, guests and the servants of guests that the Astor manner required. He accordingly built an authentically styled Tudor village to accommodate the overflow, with an "Old English Garden" including buttressed hedges and free-standing topiary. In the preceding decade, expatriate Americans led by Edwin Austin Abbey created an Anglo-American society at Broadway, Worcestershire, where topiary was one of the elements of a "Cotswold" house-and-garden style soon naturalised among upper-class Americans at home. Topiary, which had featured in very few 18th-century American gardens, came into favour with the Colonial Revival gardens and the grand manner of the American Renaissance, 1880–1920. Interest in the revival and maintenance of historic gardens in the 20th century led to the replanting of the topiary maze at the Governor's Palace, Colonial Williamsburg, in the 1930s.

=== 1900s ===
American portable style topiary was introduced to Disneyland around 1962. Walt Disney helped bring this new medium into being, wishing to recreate his cartoon characters throughout his theme park in the form of landscape shrubbery. This style of topiary is based on a suitably shaped steel wire frame through which the plants eventually extend as they grow. The frame, which remains as a permanent trimming guide, may be either stuffed with sphagnum moss and then planted, or placed around shrubbery. The sculpture slowly transforms into a permanent topiary as the plants fill in the frame. This style has led to imaginative displays and festivals throughout the Disney resorts and parks, and mosaiculture (multiple types and styles of plants creating a mosaic, living sculpture) worldwide includes the impressive display at the 2008 Summer Olympics in China. Living corporate logos along roadsides, green roof softscapes and living walls that biofilter air are offshoots of this technology.

Artificial topiary is another offshoot similar to the concept of artificial Christmas trees. This topiary mimics the style of living versions and is often used to supply indoor greenery for home or office decoration. Patents are issued for the style, design, and construction methodology of different types of topiary trees.

== Notable topiary displays ==
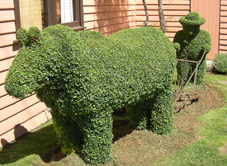
Topiary at Railton, Town of Topiary, Tasmania, Australia

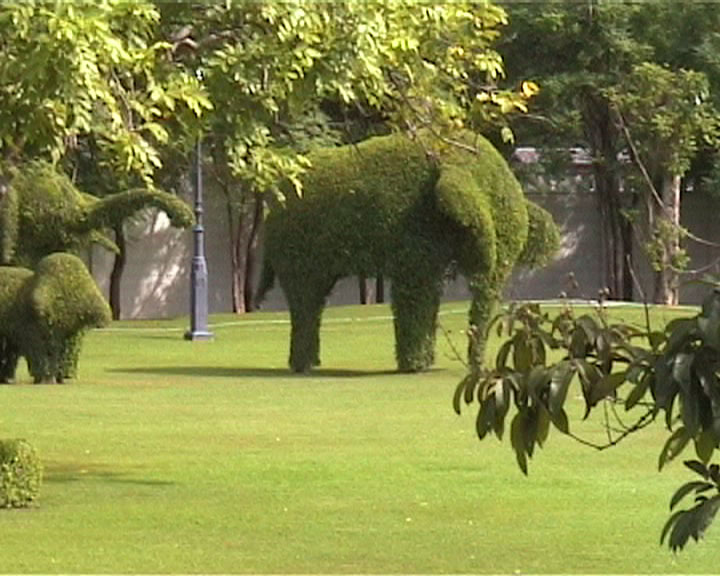
Topiary elephants at Bang Pa-In Royal Palace, Thailand

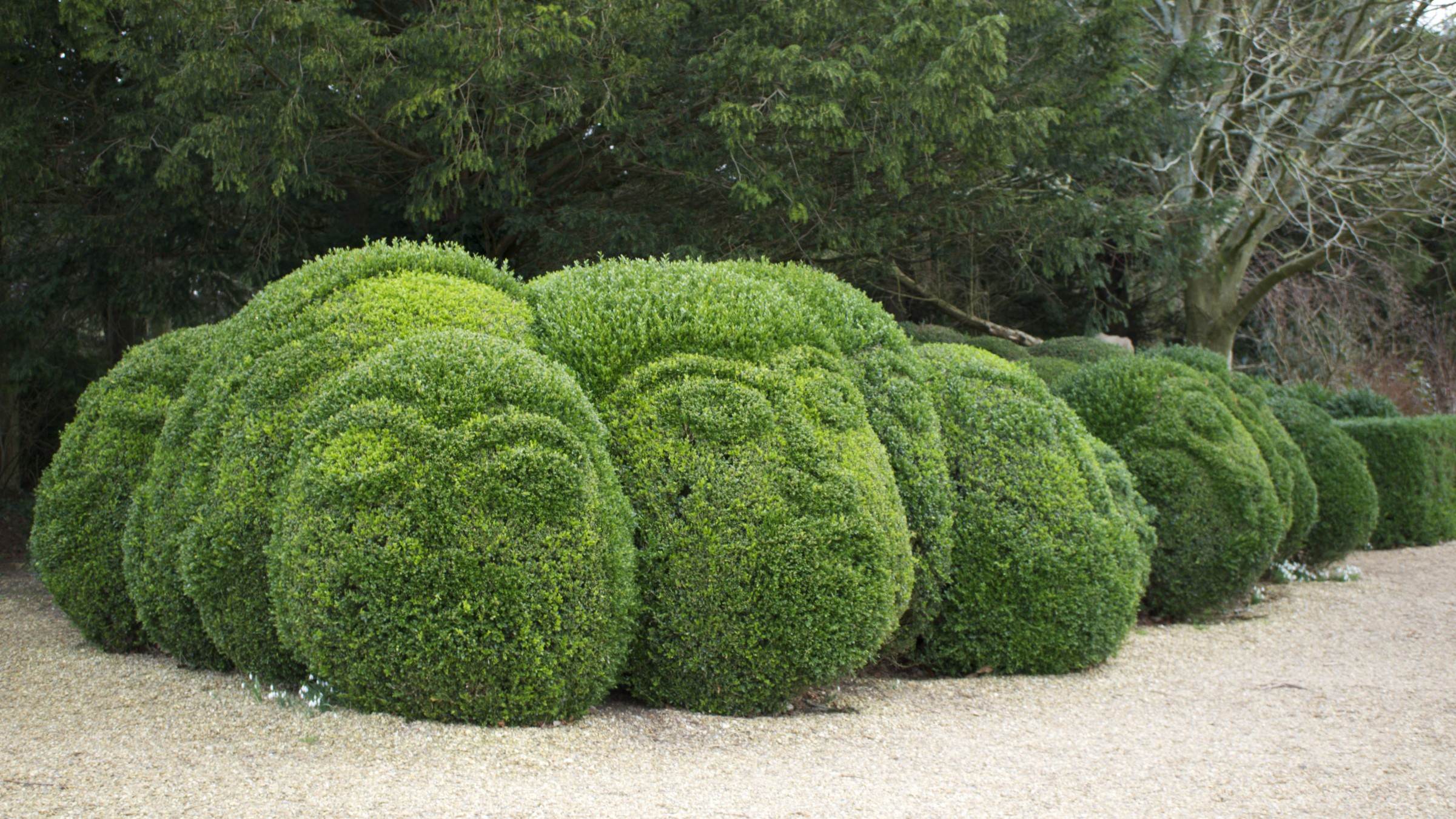
Topiary at Kingston Lacy, Dorset, England

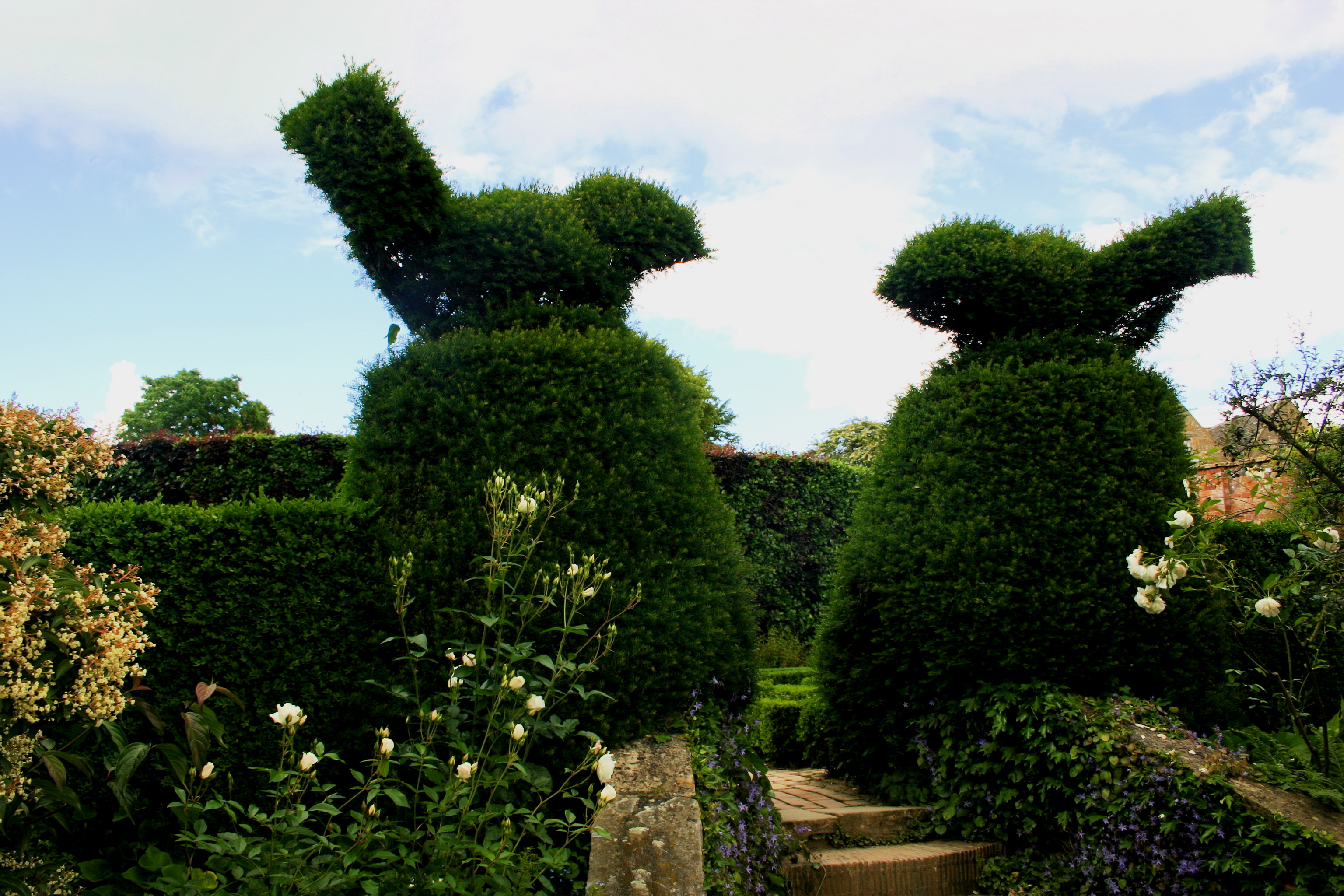
Topiary birds at Hidcote Manor Garden, Gloucestershire, England

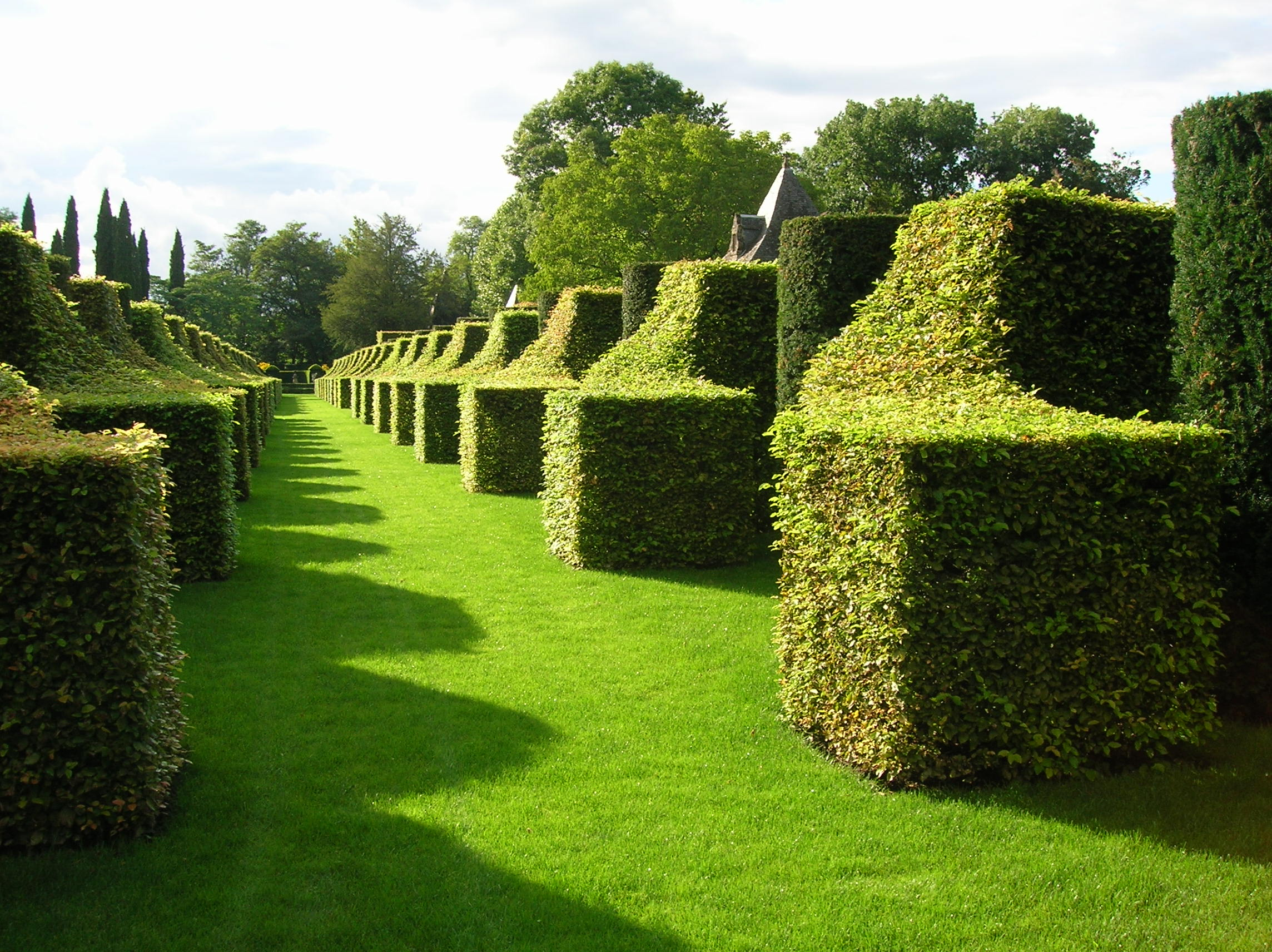
Topiary garden at Manor d'Eyrignac, France

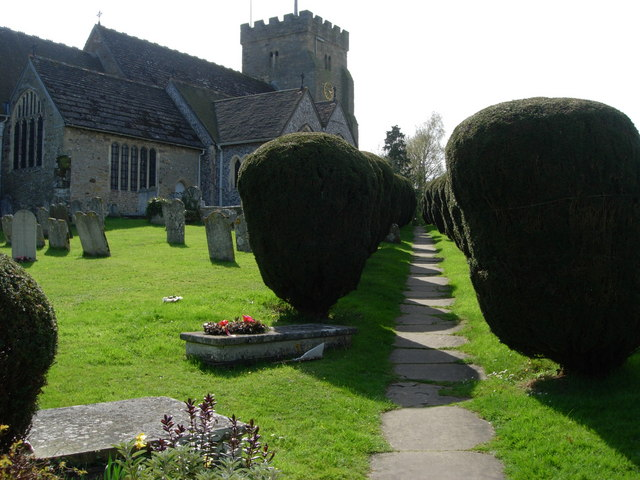
The path to St Peter's Church in Henfield, West Sussex, England

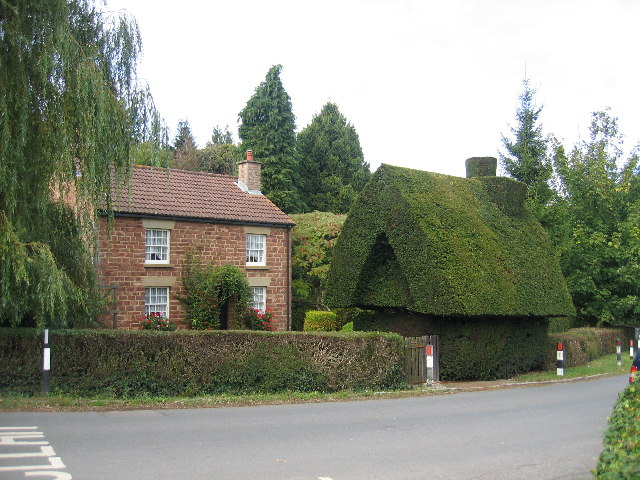
Topiary house in Longhope, Gloucestershire, England

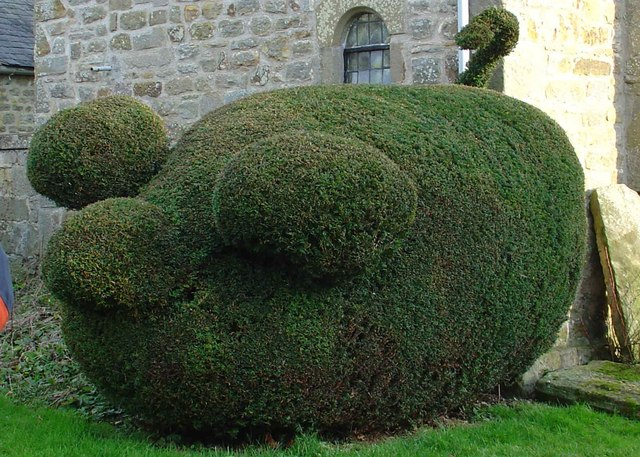
A topiary pig in Halton, Northumberland, England

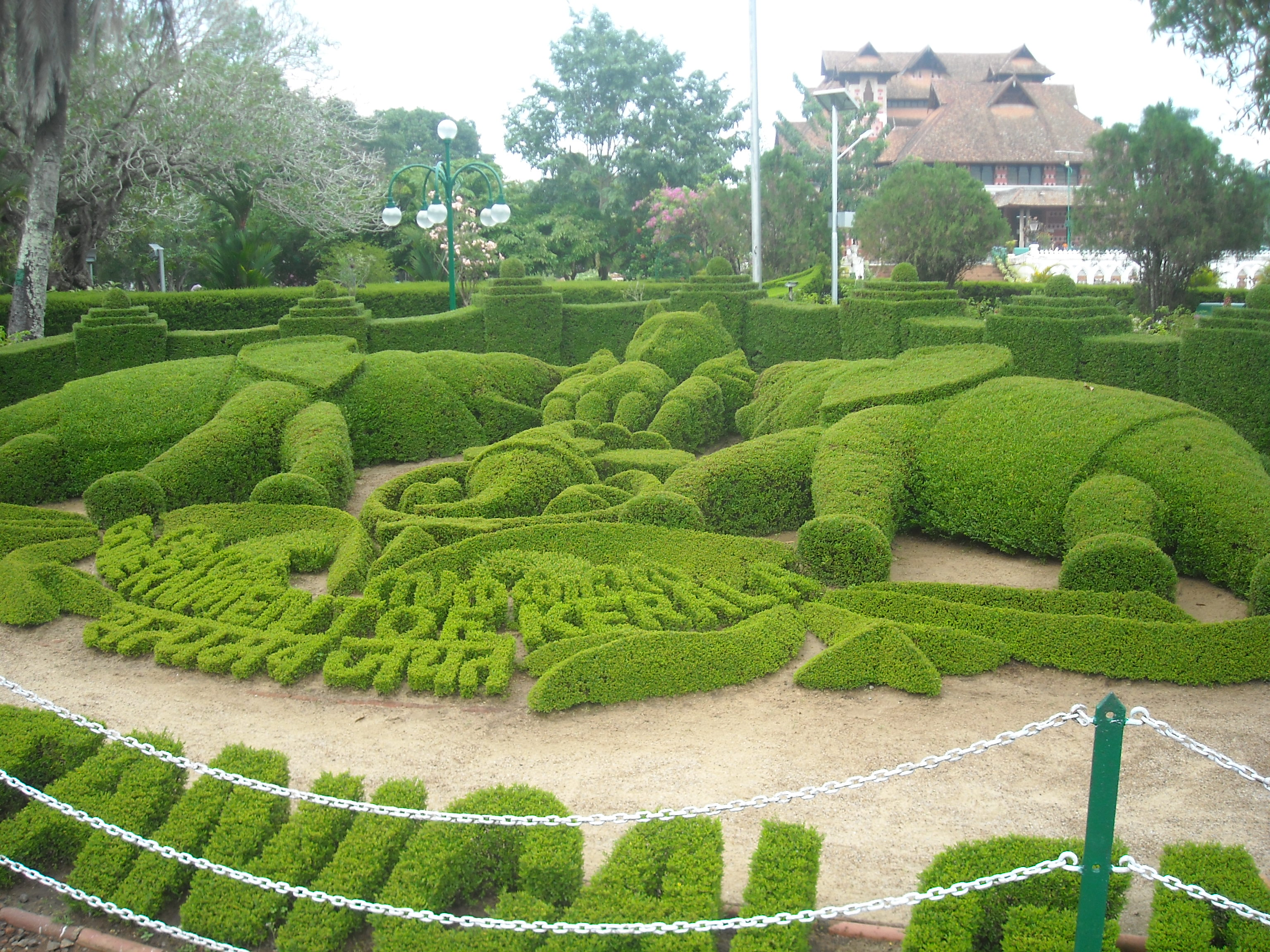
Topiary in the Botanical garden Thiruvananthapuram, India

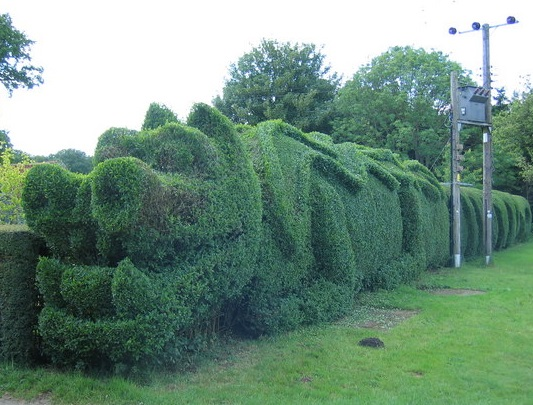
Dragon shaped hedge, East Rudham, Norfolk, England

=== Australia ===
- Railton, Tasmania, known as Railton Town of Topiary

=== Asia ===
- Mosaiculture 2006 (Shanghai, China)
- The Samban-Lei Sekpil in Manipur, India, begun in 1983 and recently measuring 18.6 m (61 ft) in height, is the world's tallest topiary, according to the Guinness Book of World Records. It is clipped of Duranta erecta, a shrub widely used in Manipuri gardens, into a tiered shape called a sekpil or satra that honours the forest god Umang Lai.
- Royal Palace at Bang Pa-In in Thailand
- The Terrace Garden in Chandigarh, India, has topiaries in the form of animals by Narinder Kumar Sharma as an attraction for children.

=== Central America ===
- Parque Francisco Alvarado, Zarcero, Costa Rica

=== South America ===
- Tulcan Topiary Garden Cemetery, Tulcan, Ecuador

=== Europe ===
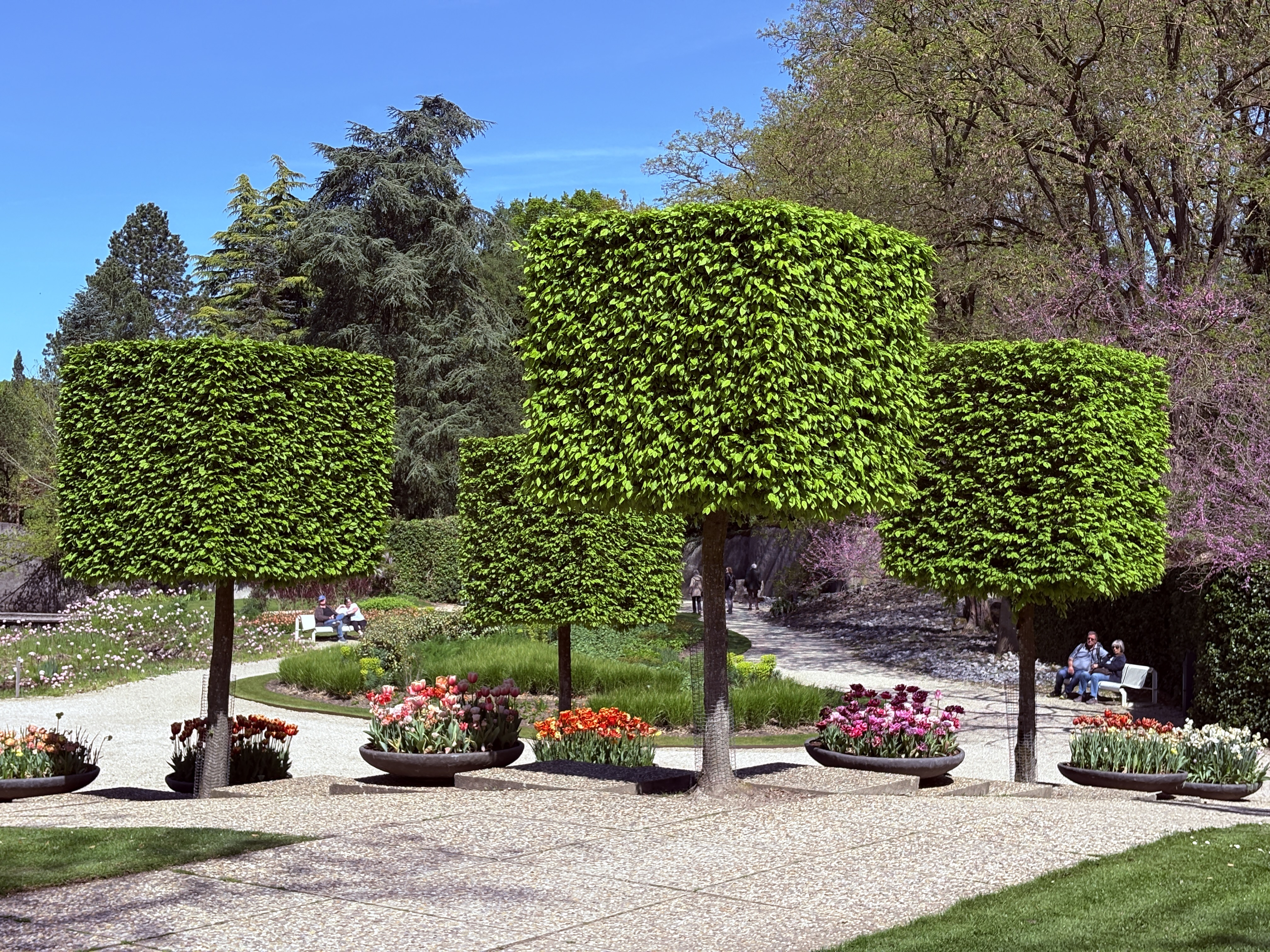
Cubic trees, Netherlands

- Cliveden (Buckinghamshire, England)
- Levens Hall (Cumbria, England)

A premier topiary garden started in the late 17th century by M. Beaumont, a French gardener who laid out the gardens of Hampton Court (which were recreated in the 1980s). Levens Hall is recognised by the Guinness Book of Records as having the oldest Topiary garden in the world.

- Topsham railway station (Devon, England) An example of topiary lettering.
- Canons Ashby (Northamptonshire, England) A 16th-century garden revised in 1708
- Stiffkey, (Norfolk, England)

Several informal designs including a line of elephants at Nellie's cottage and a guitar.

- Hidcote Manor Garden (Gloucestershire, England)
- Knightshayes Cour] (Devon, England)
- Owlpen Manor (Gloucestershire, England) A late 16th-early 17th century terraced garden on a hillside, reordered in the 1720s, with "dark, secret rooms of yew" (Vita Sackville-West).
- Great Dixter Gardens (East Sussex, England): Laid out by Nathaniel Lloyd, the author of a book on topiary, and preserved and extended by his son, the garden-writer Christopher Lloyd.
- Much Wenlock Priory, Shropshire
- Drummond Castle Gardens (Perthshire, Scotland)
- Portmeirion (Snowdonia, Wales)
- Parc des Topiares (Durbuy, Belgium)

A large topiary garden (10,000 m^{2}) with over 250 figures.

- Château de Villandry, France
- Villa Lante (Bagnaia, Italy)
- Giardino Giusti (Verona, Italy)
- Castello Balduino (Montalto Pavese, Italy)
- Guggenheim Museum, (Bilbao, Spain): A huge sculpture of a West Highland White Terrier designed by the artist Jeff Koons, which is thought by experts and scientists to be the world's biggest topiary dog.
- The Tsubo-en Zen garden in Lelystad, Netherlands is a private modern Japanese Zen (karesansui, dry rock) garden that makes extensive use of so-called O-karikomi combined with Hako-zukuri (see above).
  All seasons close-up of the Tsubo-en (Netherlands) O-karikomi, hako-zukuri topiary.
- Gardens of the Palace of Versailles outside Paris, France

=== North America ===
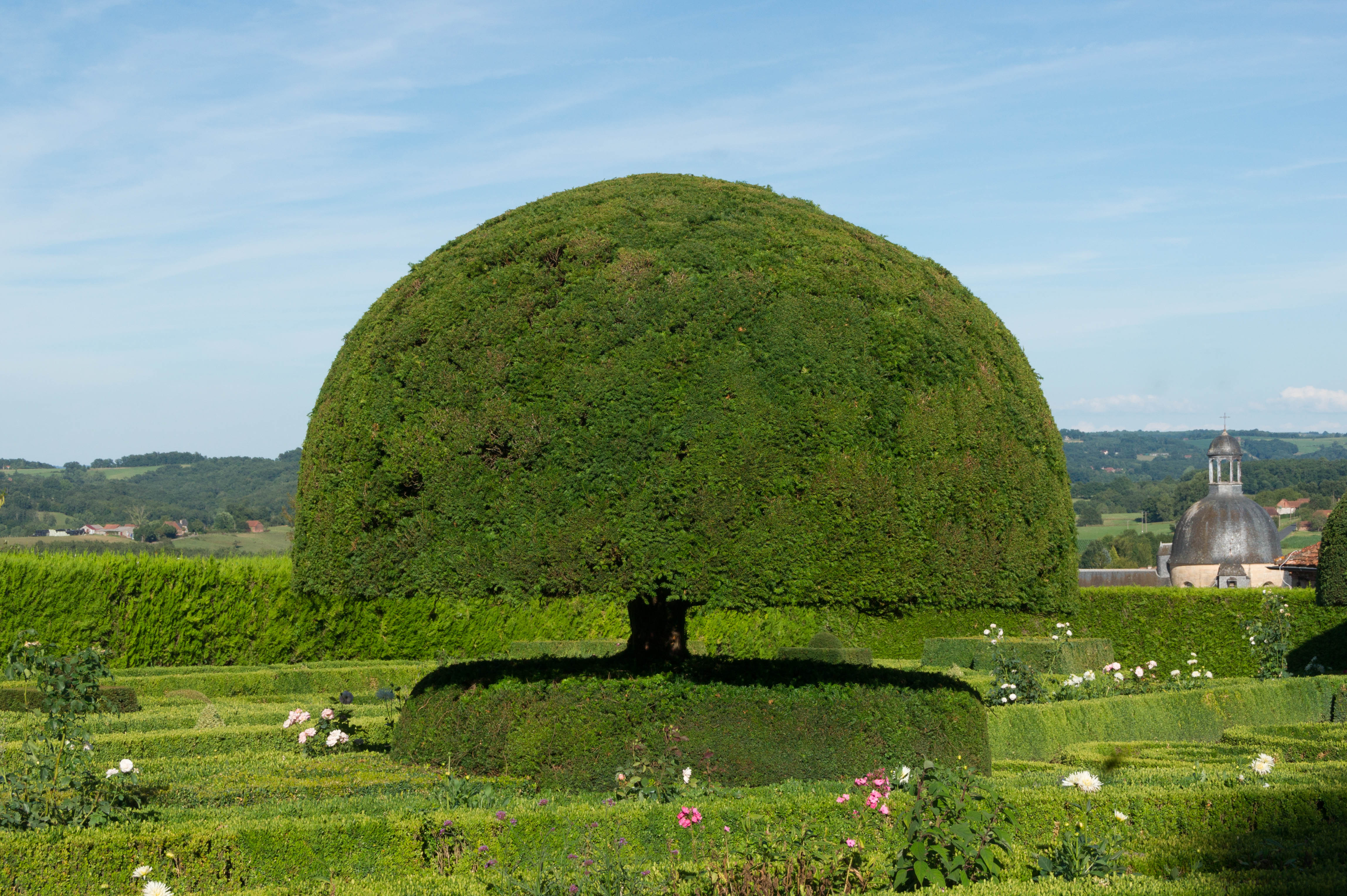
Topiary Château de Hautefort

- Hunnewell Arboretum (Wellesley, Massachusetts)

140-year-old topiary garden of native white pine and arborvitae.

- Ladew Topiary Gardens (Monkton, Maryland)

A topiary garden in Maryland established by award-winning topiary artist Harvey Ladew in the late 1930s. Located approximately halfway between the north Baltimore suburbs and the southern Pennsylvania border. Ladew's most famous topiary is a hunt, horses, riders, dogs and the fox, clearing a well-clipped hedge, the most famous single piece of classical topiary in North America.

- Topiary Garden at Longwood Gardens (Kennett Square, Pennsylvania)
- Columbus Topiary Park at Old Deaf School (Topiary Park, Columbus, Ohio)

A public garden in downtown Columbus that features a topiary tableau of Georges Seurat's famous painting Sunday Afternoon on the Island of La Grande Jatte

- Pearl Fryar's Topiary Garden, (Bishopville, South Carolina)
- Green Animals, (Portsmouth, Rhode Island)

One of the subjects of the documentary Fast, Cheap and Out of Control (1997) was George Mendonça, the topiarist at Green Animals for more than seventy years: "it's just cut and wait, cut and wait" Mendonça says in a filmed sequence.

- Busch Gardens Tampa, established 1959. 365 acre property featuring large, colorful and detailed sphagnum topiary.

== In popular culture ==
- In the Tim Burton/Johnny Depp film Edward Scissorhands, Edward proves to have a natural gift for topiary art. Numerous creative works are shown throughout the movie.
- In the Stephen King novel The Shining, topiary animals that move when people are not looking frighten the Torrance family.
- In the children's novel The Children of Green Knowe by Lucy M. Boston, an overgrown topiary figure of Noah plays a sinister role.
- A real-life topiary artist is one of the subjects of Errol Morris's Fast, Cheap and Out of Control.

== See also ==
- Bibliography of hedges and topiary
- History of gardening
- Tree shaping

== References and sources ==
Sources

- Curtis, Charles H. and W. Gibson, The Book of Topiary (reprinted, 1985 Tuttle), ISBN 0-8048-1491-0
- Lloyd, Nathaniel. Topiary: Garden Art in Yew and Box (reprinted, 2006)
