= Mosaiculture =

Horticultural art of creating topiary-like sculptures using bedding plants

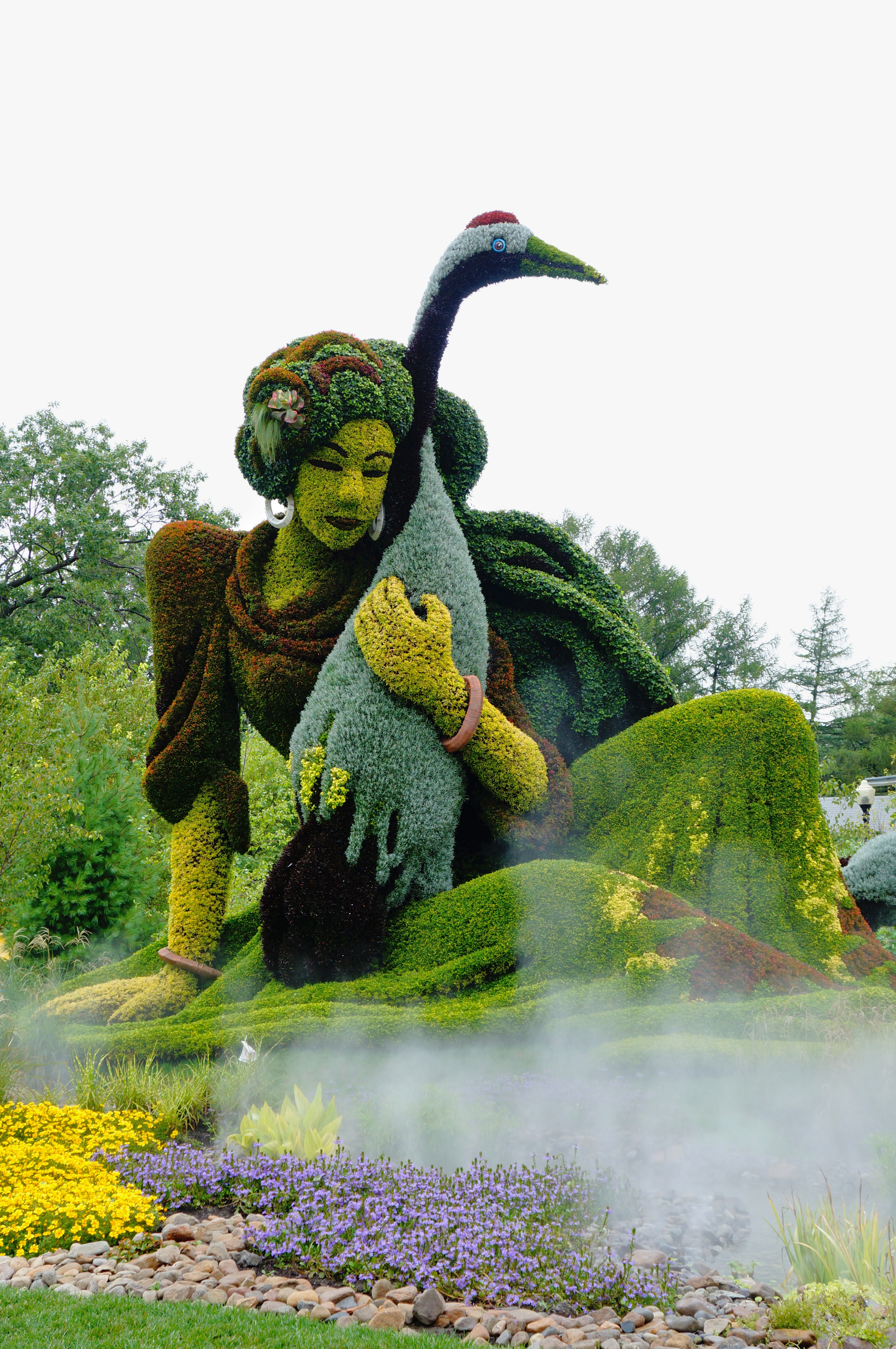
Horticultural art

Mosaiculture is the horticultural art of creating giant topiary-like sculptures using thousands of annual bedding plants to carpet steel armature forms. It is different from classical topiary.

Mosaïcultures Internationales® is the name of an international competition governed by the International Mosaiculture Committee, which was formed in 2000, the first year the event was staged. Mosaïcultures Internationales® is an internationally protected name and patent. In 2013 an international competition in Mosaicultures was held in Montreal, Canada.

As part of Canada's 150th anniversary celebrations in 2017, a large exhibition of Mosaiculture was held at Jacques Cartier Park in Gatineau, Quebec. MOSAICANADA150 featured sculptures representing Canada's 10 provinces and 3 territories, and indigenous peoples. In 2018, many of the sculptures were moved to their home province to be displayed.

== Founder ==
Lise Cormier, head of the City of Montréal's Parks, Gardens and Green Spaces Department and the Botanical Garden, first got the idea to launch an international mosaiculture competition in 1998.

== History of exhibits ==
=== 2000 – World premiere of Mosaïcultures Internationales® in Montréal ===
- Theme: The Planet is a Mosaic
- Participants: 35 cities and organizations from 14 countries
- Visitors: 730,000 (110 days)

=== 2003 – Mosaïcultures Internationales Montréal 2003 ===
- Theme: Myths and Legends of the World
- Participants: 51 cities and organizations from 32 countries
- Visitors: 755,000 (110 days)

=== 2006 – Mosaïcultures Internationales Shanghai 2006 ===
- Theme: The Earth, Our Village
- Participants: 55 cities and organizations from 15 countries
- Visitors: Over 1,000,000 (76 days)

=== 2009 – Mosaïcultures Internationales Hamamatsu 2009 ===
- Under the honorary presidency of His Imperial Highness Prince Akishino
- Theme: The Symphony of People and Nature
- Participants: 97 cities and organizations from 25 countries
- Visitors: 865,000 (66 days)

=== 2013 – Mosaïcultures Internationales de Montréal 2013 ===
- Theme: Land of Hope
- Participants: 42 cities and organizations from 22 countries
- Visitors: 1,020,000 (110 days)

=== 2017 - MOSAICANADA 150 (Gatineau/Ottawa) ===
- Theme: Canada's History
- Participants:
- Visitors: 1,300,000

=== 2020 - Mosaïcultures Québec 2022 ===
- Theme: Once Upon a Time … The Earth
