= Manor d'Eyrignac =

Coordinates: 44°56′26″N 1°18′54″E

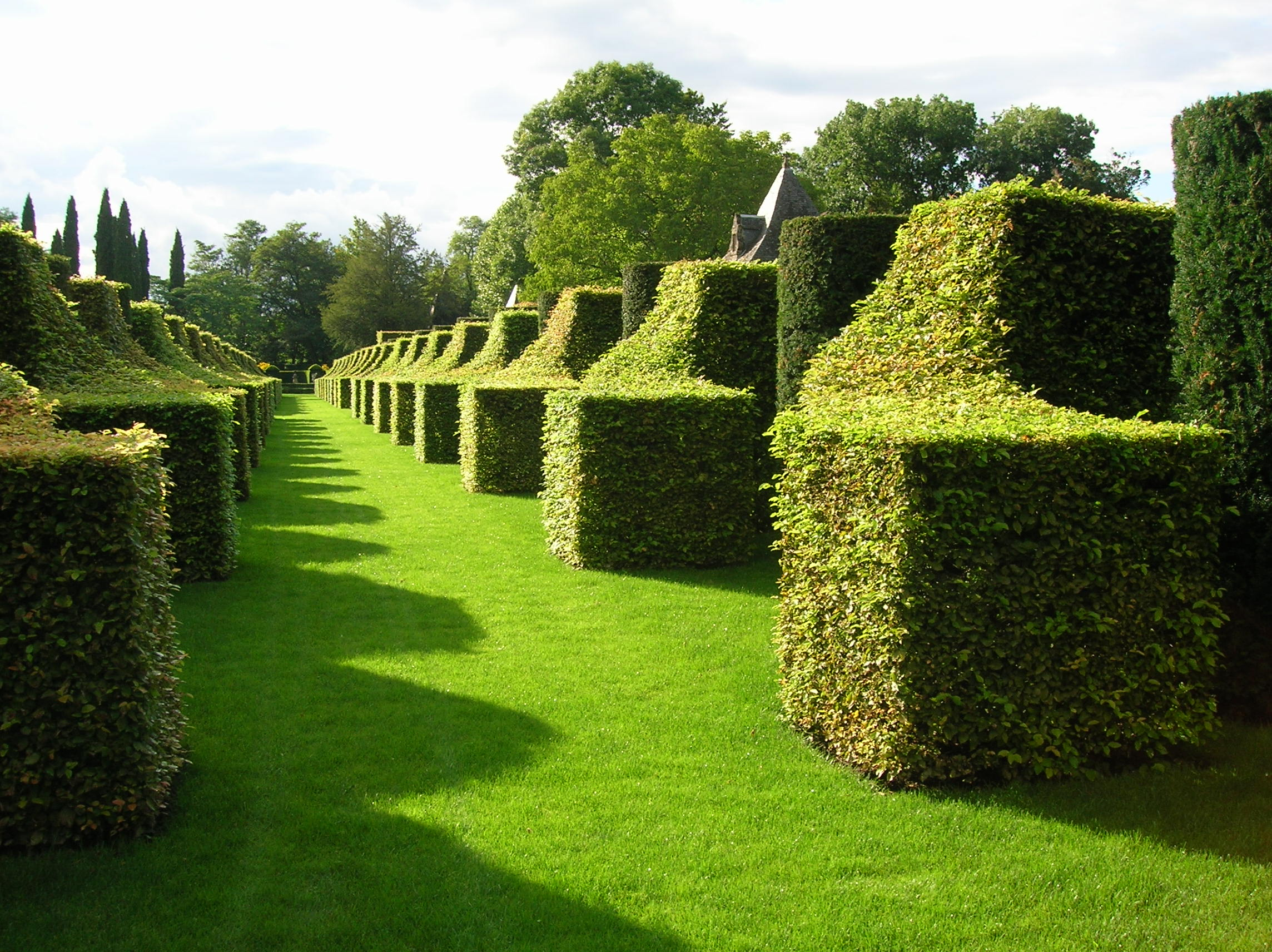
Topiary garden of the Manor of Eyrignac

The Manoir d'Eyrignac is a 17th-century manor house in Salignac-Eyvigues, in the Dordogne department of France, surrounded by a recreated 18th-century Italian Renaissance garden and an elaborate topiary garden. The house is sited on top of a hill, with water coming from seven springs. Only a pavilion, fountains and basins remain from the original 18th-century garden. In the 1960s, the new owner, Giles Sermadiras de Cuzols de Lile, created the new garden, which features topiary sculptures, vistas, fountains, statues, and an allée of vases. The garden is listed by the Committee of Parks and Gardens of the French Ministry of Culture as one of the Notable Gardens of France.

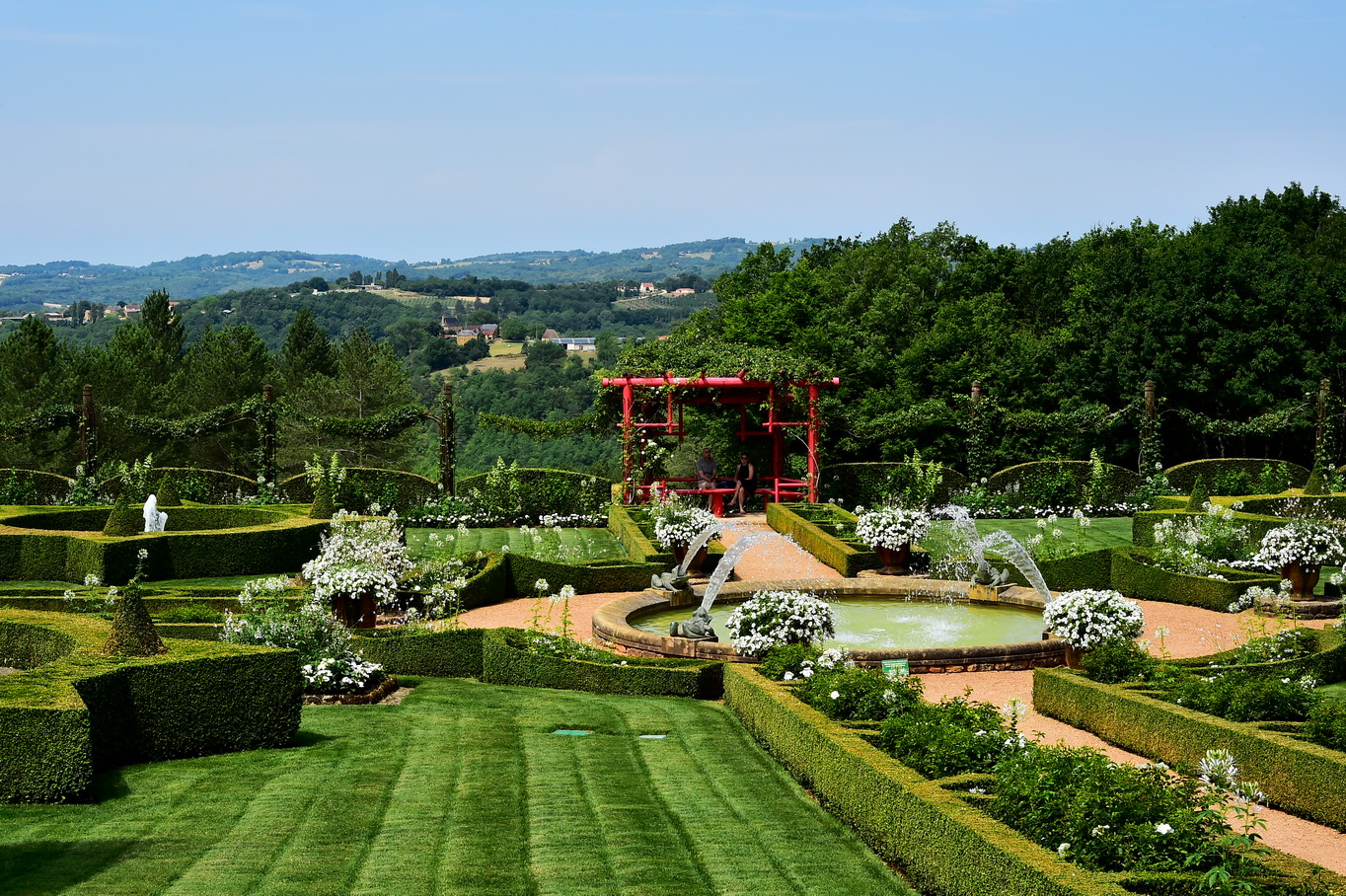
Le Jardin Blanc

== The 7 gardens ==
- The White garden
- Greenery sculptures
- The Chinese Pagoda
- The Springs Garden and Wild Flower Meadows
- The Kitchen Garden and the Flower Garden
- The Manor of Artaban
- French Garden
