= Small knot =

Method of tying a necktie

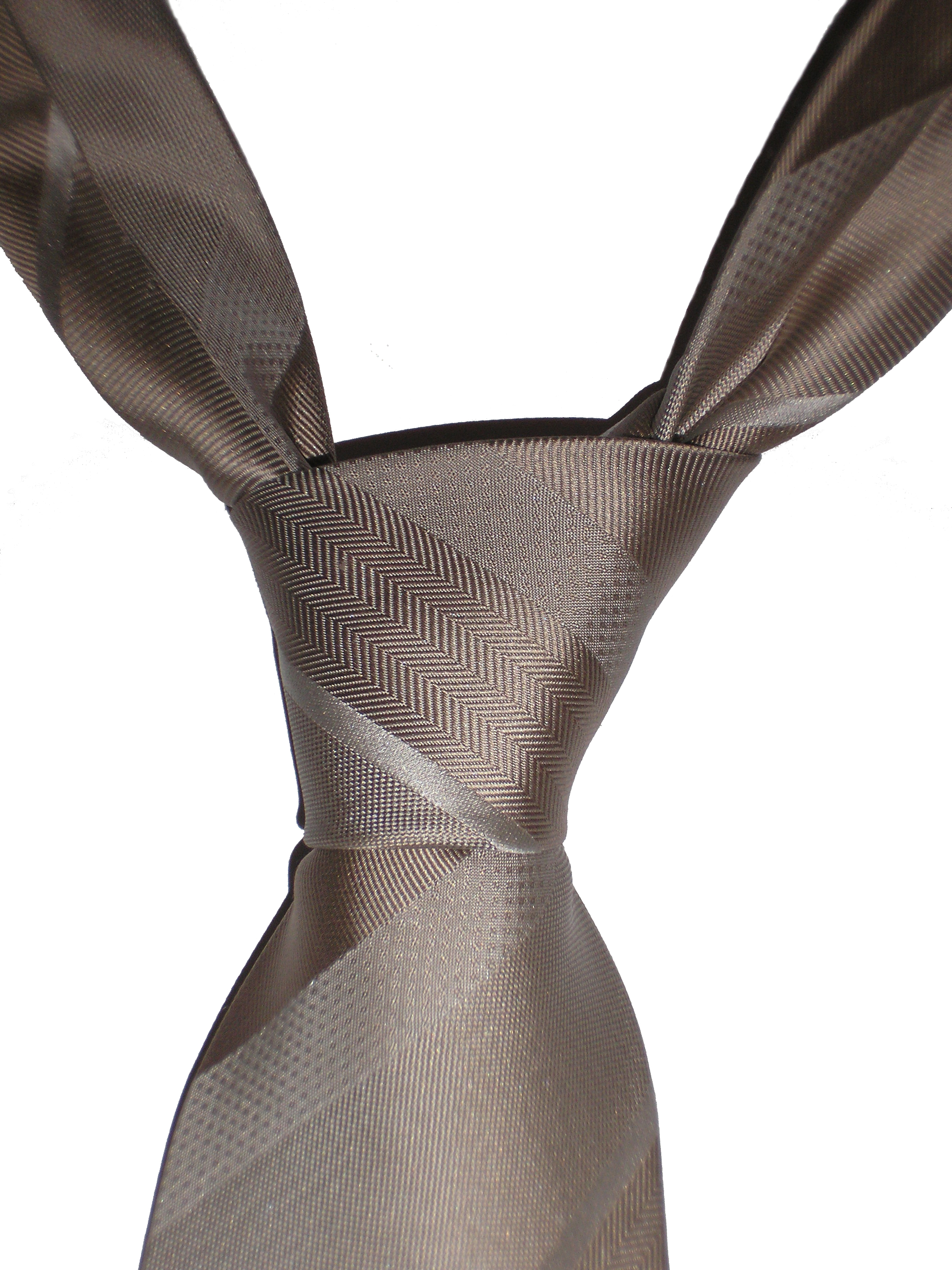
A small knot

The small knot, also known as oriental knot, Kent knot, or simple knot, is the simplest method of tying a necktie. Unlike the Four-in-hand knot and Windsor knot, the small knot is not self-releasing. The small knot is tied inside out, though this can be mitigated by giving the tie a half-twist during the tying process.

Using the notation from The 85 Ways to Tie a Tie, the knot is tied

- Lo Ri Co T.

== See also ==
- Four-in-hand knot
- Pratt knot
- Half-Windsor knot
- Windsor knot
- List of knots
