= Nicky knot =

Necktie knot

The Nicky knot is a way of tying a necktie. It is a self-releasing version of the Pratt knot. Like the Pratt knot, it is tied inside-out. It originated in Milan, Italy, and may have been named after Nikita Khrushchev after he visited the city. The knot is larger than the Four-in-hand knot and smaller than the Half-Windsor knot.

Using the notation of The 85 Ways to Tie a Tie, the Nicky knot is tied

- Lo Ci Ro Li Co T (knot 4).

== See also ==
- Pratt knot—a non-self-releasing variant
- List of knots
