= Cross tie =

Cross tie can refer to:

- A kind of bow tie
- Cross tie (railroad)
- Cross tie (stable)
- Cross Tie (song, see Over the James)
