= V.M. Live Presents...Avail =

Live album by Avail
- Released: 1999
- Recorded: 29 June 1997
- Label: Liberation Records

V.M. Live Presents...Avail is a live album by Avail. It was recorded at the Fireside Bowl in Chicago, on 29 June 1997, less than two weeks after the recording of Live at the Bottom of the Hill in San Francisco. The album was released by Liberation Records in 1999.

== Track listing ==
1. "Order"
2. "Tuning"
3. "Fix"
4. "Armchair"
5. "FCA"
6. "Virus"
7. "Nickel Bridge"
8. "Simple Song"
9. "Model"
10. "Pinned Up"
11. "Nameless"
12. "Clone"
13. "March"
14. "On the Nod"
15. "Connection"
