= Live at the Kings Head Inn =

Live album by Avail
- Released: 1993/2000
- Recorded: April 1993 at the Kings Head Inn, Norfolk, Virginia
- Venues: Kings Head Inn, Norfolk, VA
- Genres: Post-hardcore Rock, Hardcore, Punk
- Label: Lookout! Records/Old Glory Records

Avail chronology
Satiate (1992)	Live at the Kings Head Inn (1993)	Dixie (1994)

Live at the King's Head Inn is Avail's first live album, released on Old Glory Records in 1994 on 10" Vinyl and reissued by Jade Tree Records in 2006 as bonus tracks to the Dixie album reissue.

== Track listing ==
1. "Sidewalk" (Dixie)
2. "Stride" (Satiate)
3. "Song" (Dixie)
4. "Observations" (Satiate)
5. "Predictable" (Satiate)
6. "Forgotten" (Satiate)
7. "Pinned Up "(Satiate)
8. (30 seconds of the crowd chanting, no song)
9. "Kiss Off" (Violent Femmes cover)
10. "Connection" (Satiate)
