= Pratt knot =

Method of tying a necktie

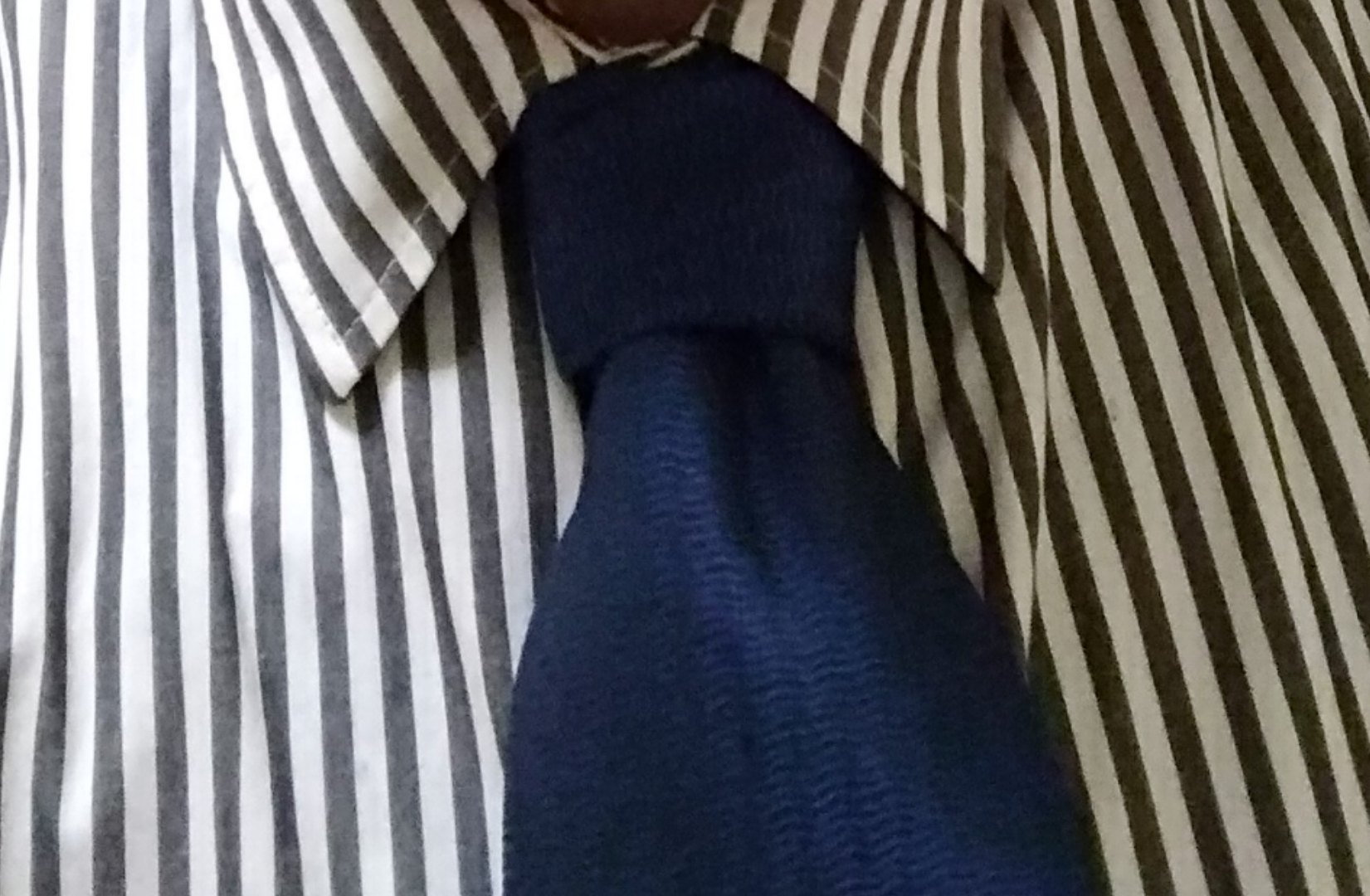
A blue Pratt knot.

The Pratt knot is a method of tying a necktie. It is also known as the Shelby knot. The knot was created in the late 1950s by Jerry Pratt, an employee of the US Chamber of Commerce. It was popularized as the Shelby knot after then 92-year-old Pratt taught it in 1986 to television reporter Don Shelby, who he felt had been tying his tie poorly on the air. Shelby then refined the Pratt knot with local clothier Kingford Bavender and wore it on the air with a spread collar where it stood out and attracted attention for its symmetry and trim precision.

The knot is a variation on the Nicky knot. Both the Pratt and Nicky knots are tied inside out, though only the Nicky knot is self-releasing. Before its popularization in a 1989 New York Times article, the knot was unknown within the fashion world and not recorded in the tie industry's standard reference guide of the time, Getting Knotted – 188 Knots for Necks by Davide Mosconi and Riccardo Villarosa in Milan, Italy.

The Pratt knot uses less length than the half-Windsor or Windsor knots, and so is well suited to shorter ties or taller men. Unlike the four-in-hand knot, the Pratt method produces a symmetrical knot. It is of medium thickness.

Using notation from and according to The 85 Ways to Tie a Tie, the knot is tied

- Lo Ci Lo Ri Co T (knot 5).

== See also ==
- List of knots
