= Live at the Bottom of the Hill in San Francisco =

Live album by Avail
- Released: 1998
- Recorded: 1997
- Label: Lookout! Records

Avail chronology
4am Friday (1996)	Live at the Bottom of the Hill in San Francisco (1998)	Over the James (1998)

Live at the Bottom of the Hill in San Francisco is a live album by Avail recorded during a show at Bottom of the Hill in San Francisco in 1997. The show was part of Avail's tour supporting their latest studio album, 4am Friday, which was released in 1996. Live at the Bottom... was released on Lookout! Records in 1998.

== Track listing ==
1. "South Bound 95" (Dixie) - 1:32
2. "Stride" (Satiate) - 2:55
3. "Order" (4am Friday) - 1:46
4. "Tuning" (Dixie) - 2:31
5. "Fix" (4am Friday) - 2:12
6. "FCA" (4am Friday) - 2:24
7. "Pinned Up" (Satiate) - 2:41
8. "Nickel Bridge" (Over the James - unreleased at time) - 1:46
9. "Simple Song" (4am Friday) - 3:07
10. "Clone" (Dixie) - 2:19
11. "Nameless" (4am Friday) - 3:22
12. "Scuffle Town" (Over the James - unreleased at time) - 1:19
13. "Blue Ridge" (4am Friday) - 3:55
14. "Virus" (Dixie) - 2:35
15. "Model" (Dixie) - 3:54
