= Front Porch Stories =

Studio album by Avail
- Released: November 5, 2002
- Recorded: June 2002 at Sound of Music Studios, Richmond, Virginia
- Genre: Punk rock
- Label: Fat Wreck Chords

Avail chronology
One Wrench (2000)	Front Porch Stories (2002)

Professional ratings
Review scores
Source	Rating
AllMusic	4.5/5 stars
Punknews.org	4/5 stars

Front Porch Stories is Avail's sixth studio album, released on Fat Wreck Chords in 2002. It was the band's final album.

== Track listing ==
1. "Black and Red" - 2:15
2. "Blue Times Two" - 2:56
3. "West Wye" - 2:55
4. "You" - 2:47
5. "Gravel to Dirt" - 2:10
6. "Done Reckoning" - 1:42
7. "East on Main" - 2:28
8. "Versus" - 3:04
9. "Subdued and Arrested" - 2:40
10. "Monuments" - 1:54
11. "The Falls" - 3:36
12. "Now" - 3:33
