= Bow tie =

Variety of necktie

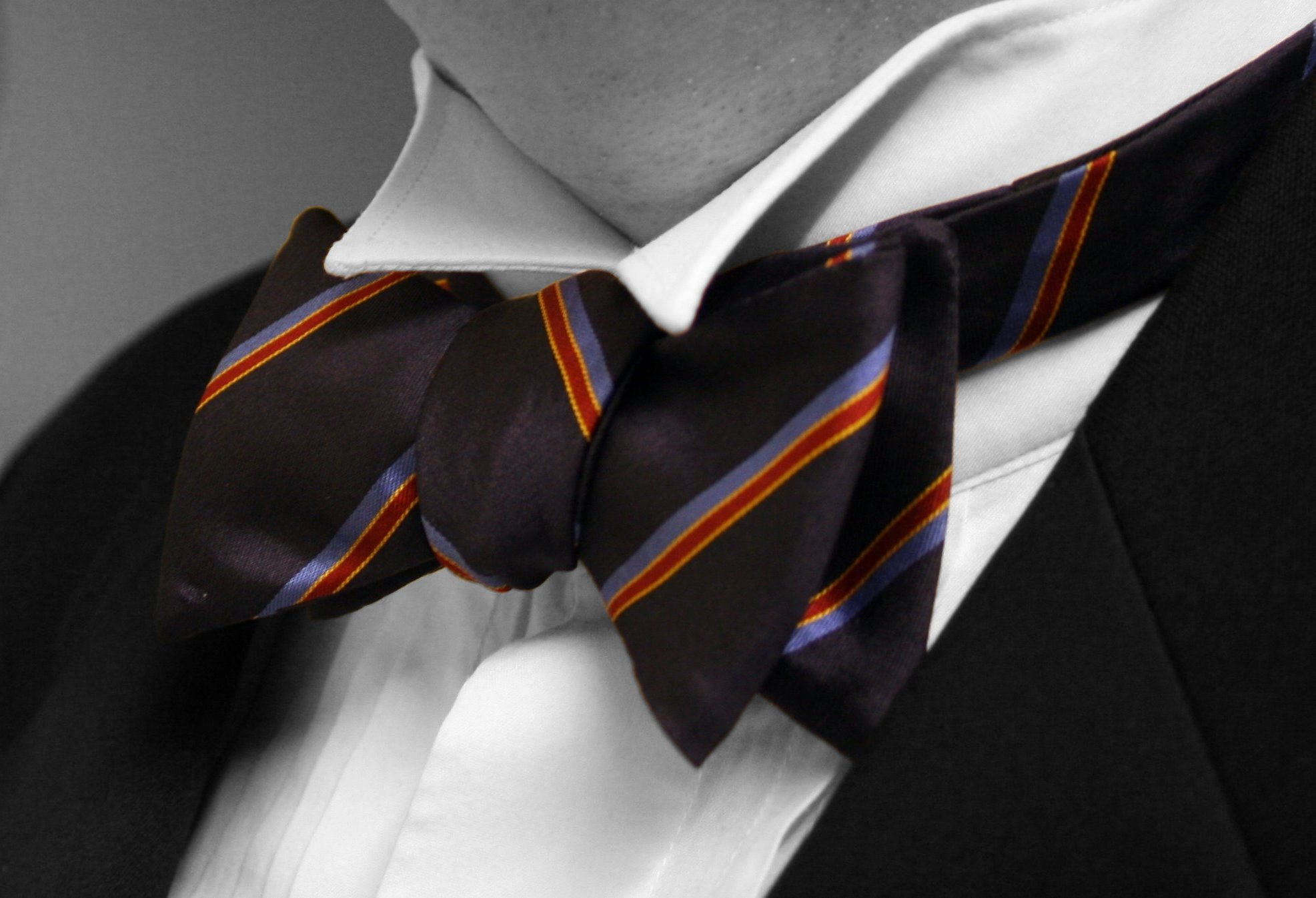
A striped bow tie

A bow tie or dicky bow /boʊ/ is a type of neckwear, distinguishable from a necktie because it does not drape down the shirt placket, but is tied just underneath a collar. A modern bow tie is tied using a common shoelace knot, which is also called the bow knot for that reason. It consists of a ribbon of fabric tied around the collar of a shirt in a symmetrical manner so that the two opposite ends form loops.

There are generally three types of bow ties: the pre-tied, the clip-on, and the self-tie. Pre-tied bow ties are ties in which the distinctive bow is sewn onto a band that goes around the neck and clips to secure. Some "clip-ons" dispense with the band altogether, instead clipping straight to the collar. The traditional bow tie, consisting of a strip of cloth that the wearer has to tie by hand, is also known as a "self-tie", "tie-it-yourself", or "freestyle" bow tie.

Bow ties may be made of any fabric material, but most are made from silk, polyester, cotton, or a mixture of fabrics. Some fabrics (e.g., wool or velvet) are much less common for bow ties than for ordinary four-in-hand neckties.

== Origin and history ==
The bow tie originated among Croatian mercenaries during the Thirty Years' War of the 17th century: the Croat mercenaries used a scarf around the neck to hold together the opening of their shirts. This was soon adopted (under the name cravat, derived from the French for "Croat") by the upper classes in France, then a leader in fashion, and flourished in the 18th and 19th centuries. It is uncertain whether the cravat then evolved into the bow tie and four-in-hand necktie, or whether the cravat gave rise to the bow tie, which in turn led to the four-in-hand necktie.

The most traditional bow ties are usually of a fixed length and are made for a specific size neck. Sizes can vary between approximately 14 inches (36 cm) and 19 inches (48 cm) as with a comparable shirt collar. Fixed-length bow ties are preferred when worn with the most formal wing-collar shirts, so as not to expose the buckle or clasp of an adjustable bow tie. Adjustable bow ties are the standard when the tie is to be worn with a less formal, lie-down collar shirt that obscures the neckband of the tie. "One-size-fits-all" adjustable bow ties are a later invention that helps to moderate production costs.

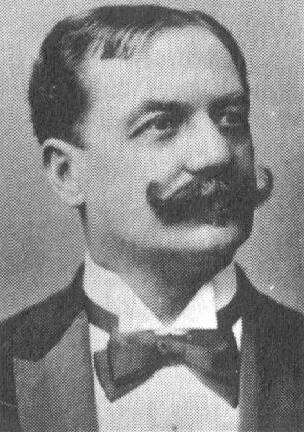
Karl Michael Ziehrer wearing a 19th-century style bow tie

The lavallière is a type of cravat similar to the bow tie that was popularly worn in the 19th century in France. It is of a similar fashion to the bow tie but has a larger knot and drooping ends.

== Wearers ==
To its devotees, the bow tie suggests iconoclasm of an Old World sort, a fusty adherence to a contrarian point of view. The bow tie hints at intellectualism, real or feigned, and sometimes suggests technical acumen, perhaps because it is so hard to tie. Bow ties are worn by magicians, country doctors, lawyers and professors and by people hoping to look like the above. But perhaps most of all, wearing a bow tie is a way of broadcasting an aggressive lack of concern for what other people think.

— Warren St John in The New York Times, 2005

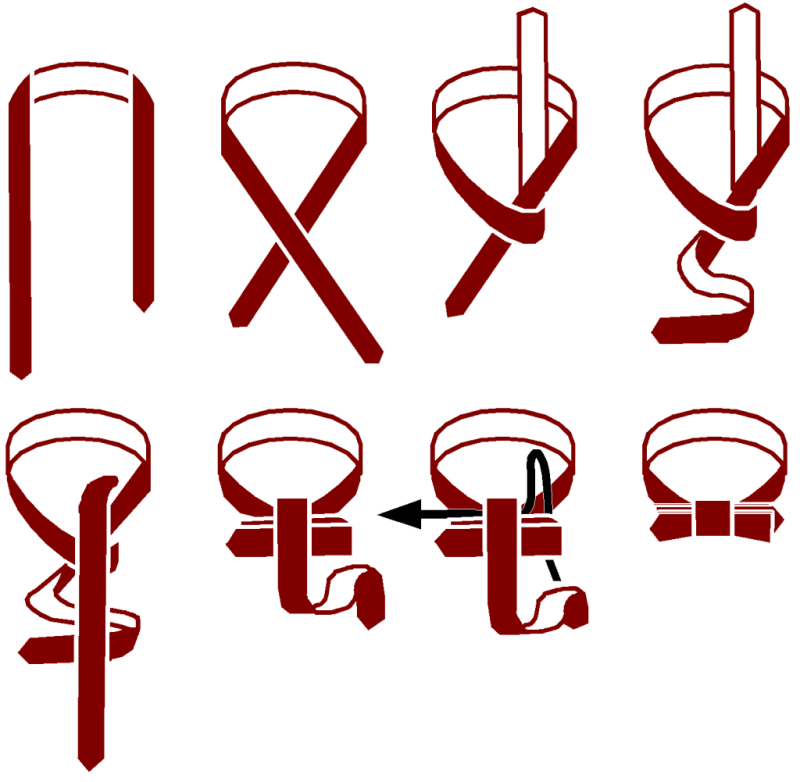
Instructions on a common way to tie a bow tie

Popular perception tends to associate bow tie wearers with particular professions, such as architects, debt collectors, attorneys, university professors, teachers, waiters, and politicians. Pediatricians frequently wear bow ties, for infants cannot grab them the way they could grab a four-in-hand necktie. Bow ties do not readily droop into places where they would get soiled or where they could, whether accidentally or deliberately, strangle the wearer. Clowns sometimes use an oversized bow tie for comic effect. Classical musicians traditionally perform in white tie or black tie ensembles, of which both designs are bow ties. Bow ties are also associated with weddings, mainly because of their almost universal inclusion in traditional formal evening-wear.

Bow ties, or slight variations thereof, have also made their way into women's wear, especially business attire. The 1980s saw professional women, especially in law, banking, and the corporate world, donning very conservative tailored suits, with a rise of almost 6 million units in sales. These were often worn with buttoned-up blouses, some with pleats up the front like tuxedo shirts, and accessorized with bow ties that were slightly fuller than the standard bow ties worn by their male counterparts, but typically consisting of the same fabrics, colors, and patterns as men's ties.

Russell Smith, style columnist for Toronto's The Globe and Mail, records mixed opinions of bow tie wearers. He observed that bow ties were experiencing a potential comeback among men, though "the class conscious man recoils at the idea" of pre-tied bow ties and "[l]eft-wingers ... recoil at what they perceive to be a symbol of political conservatism." He argues that anachronism is the point, and that bow tie wearers are making a public statement of their disdain for changing fashion. Such people may not be economic conservatives, he argues, but they are social conservatives. In Smith's view, the bow tie is "the embodiment of propriety", an indicator of fastidiousness, and "an instant sign of nerddom in Hollywood movies", but "not the mark of a ladies' man" and "not exactly sexy". He attributes the building of this image to the association of the bow tie with newspaper editors (because of their fastidiousness with words), high-school principals, and bachelor English teachers. Most men, he observes, only wear bow ties with formal dress.

== Types ==
=== Self-tie ===
There are usually two shapes of self-tie bow ties available: the "bat wing", which is parallel-sided like a cricket bat, and the "thistle", also known as the "butterfly". An example of each can also be seen below. Which is worn is a matter of personal preference. Some other shapes do exist; for instance, the Diamond Point, with pointed tips at both ends. This is a double-ended type, with both ends shaped, though occasionally, ties are tied in the single-ended type, in which only one end flares out to give the batwing or thistle shape, and the other remains thin. To tie one of these requires careful consideration, to ensure the broader end finishes in front of the thinner one.

Self-Tie Bows

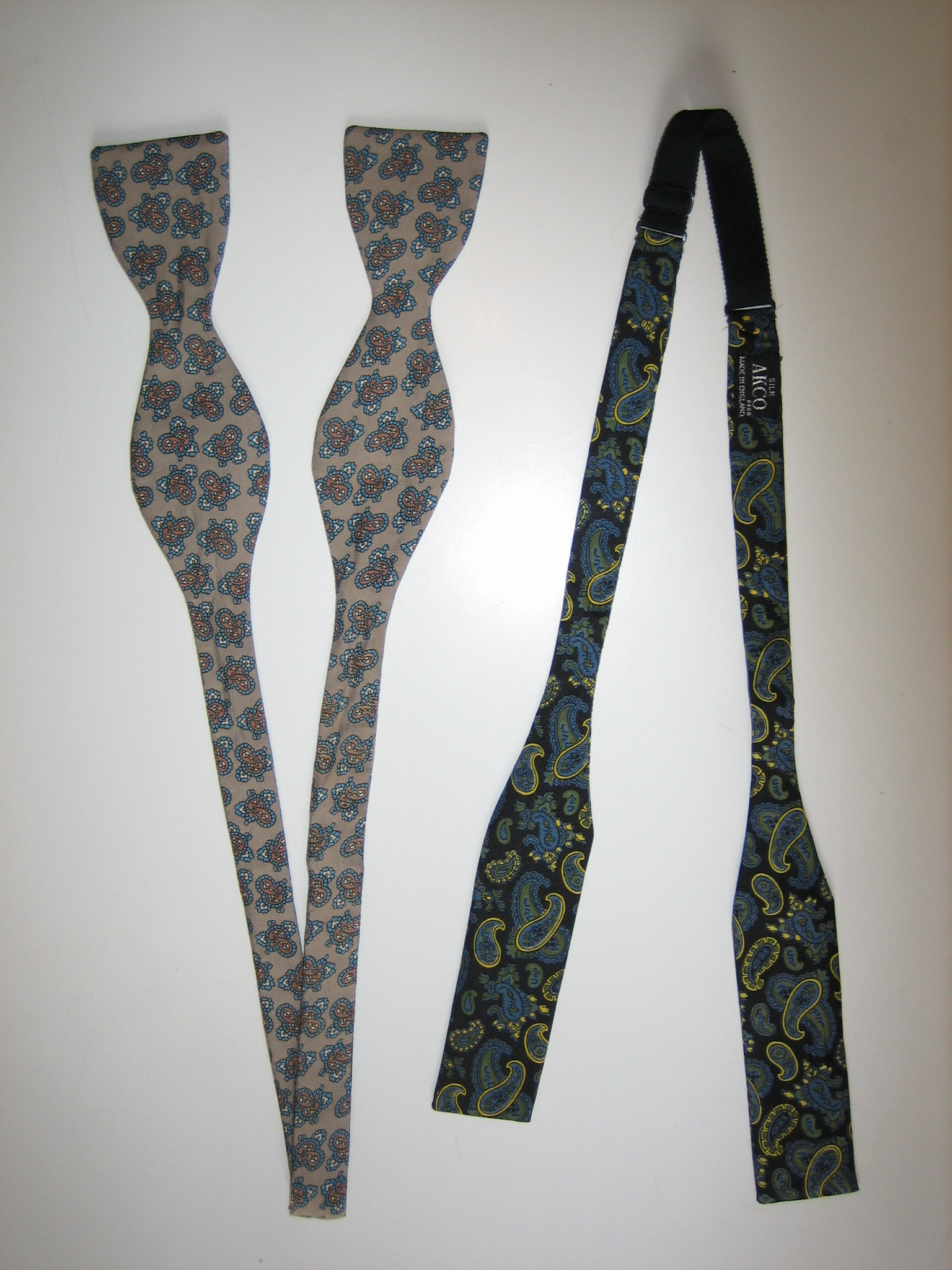
Silk bow ties. Fixed length with "thistle" ends (left) and adjustable with "bat wing" ends (right).

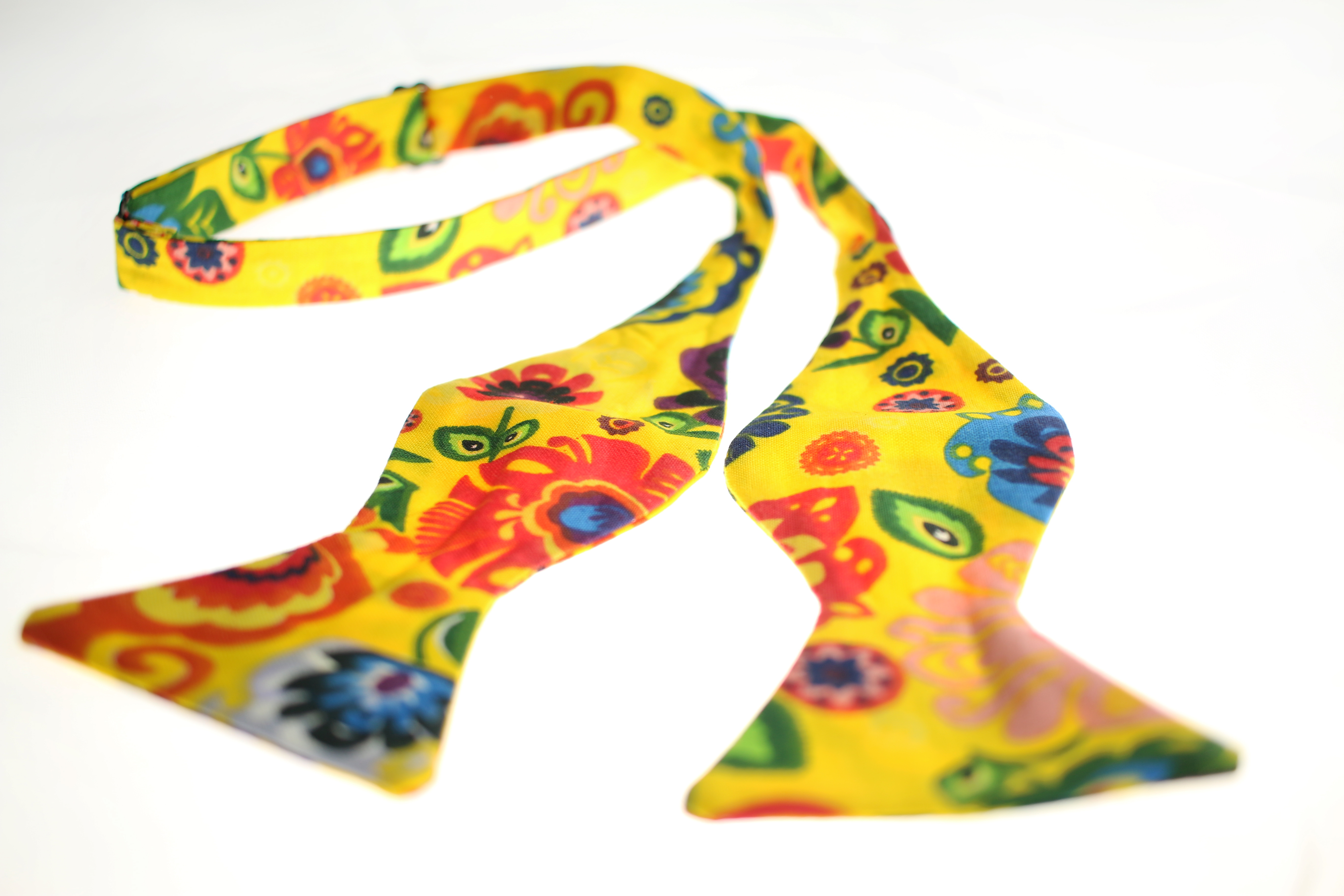
Bright Yellow patterned self-tie bow tie, made of cotton, designed and made in the UK

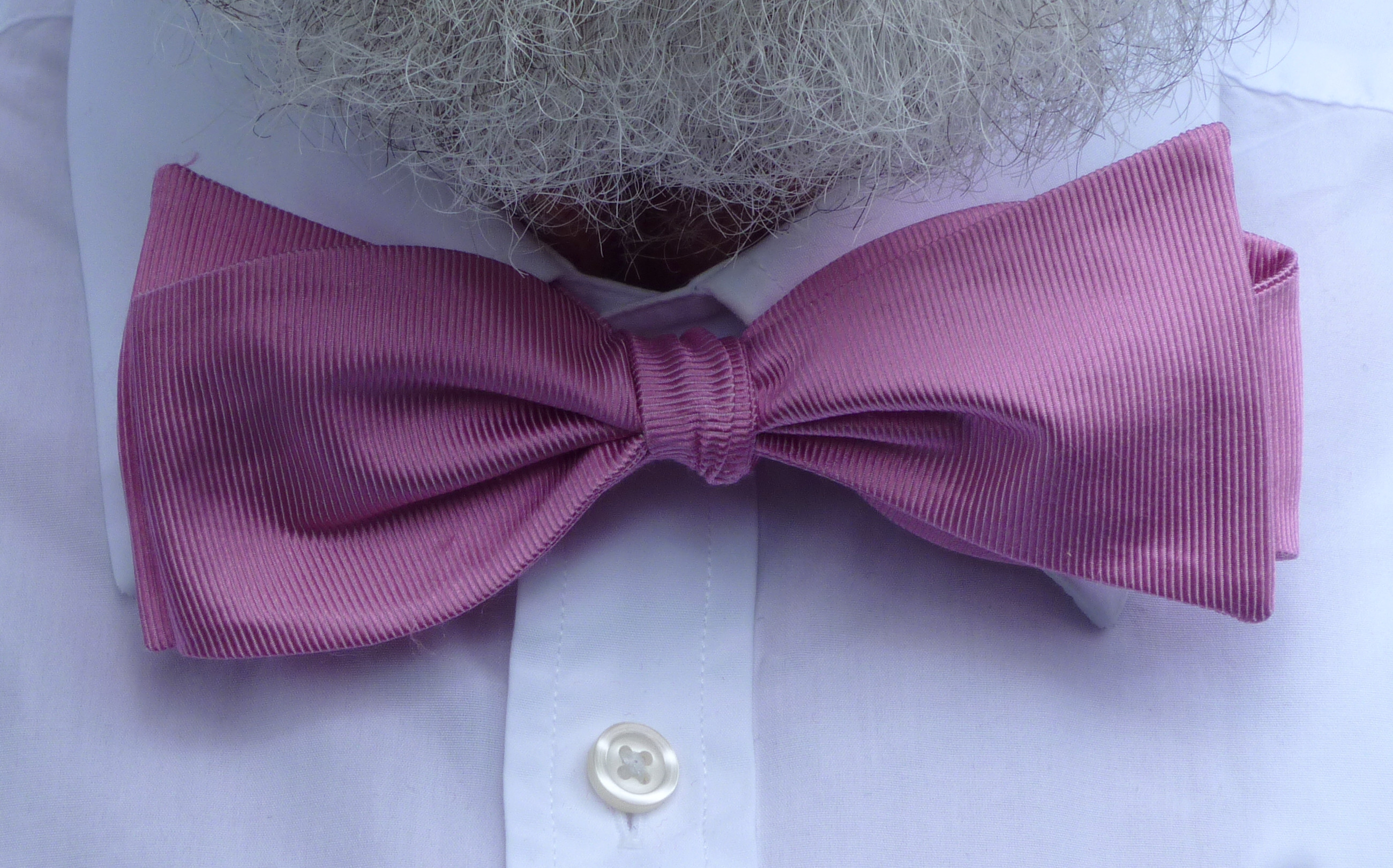
Bow tie, type Butterfly, silk

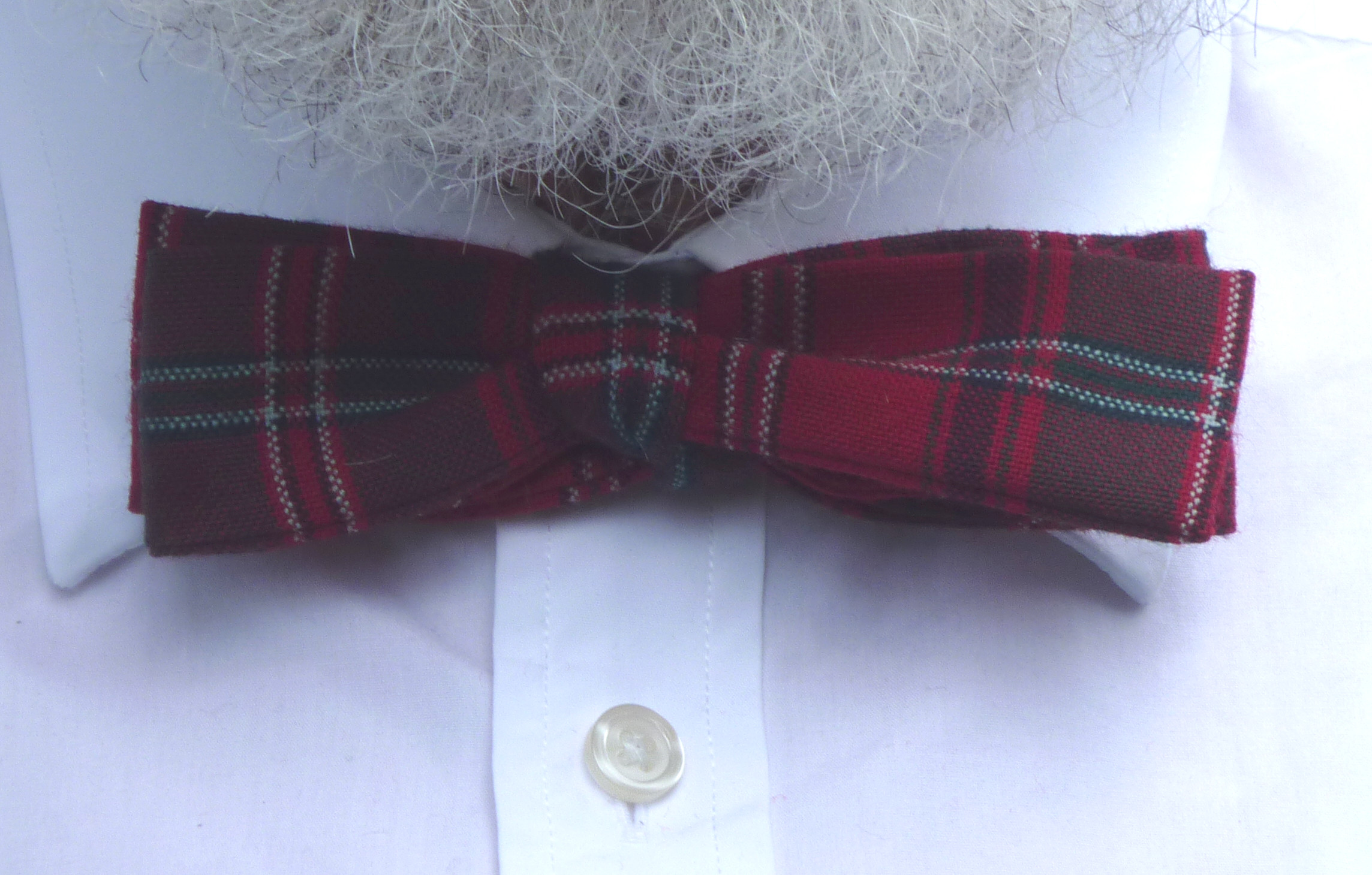
Bow tie, type Batwing, wool

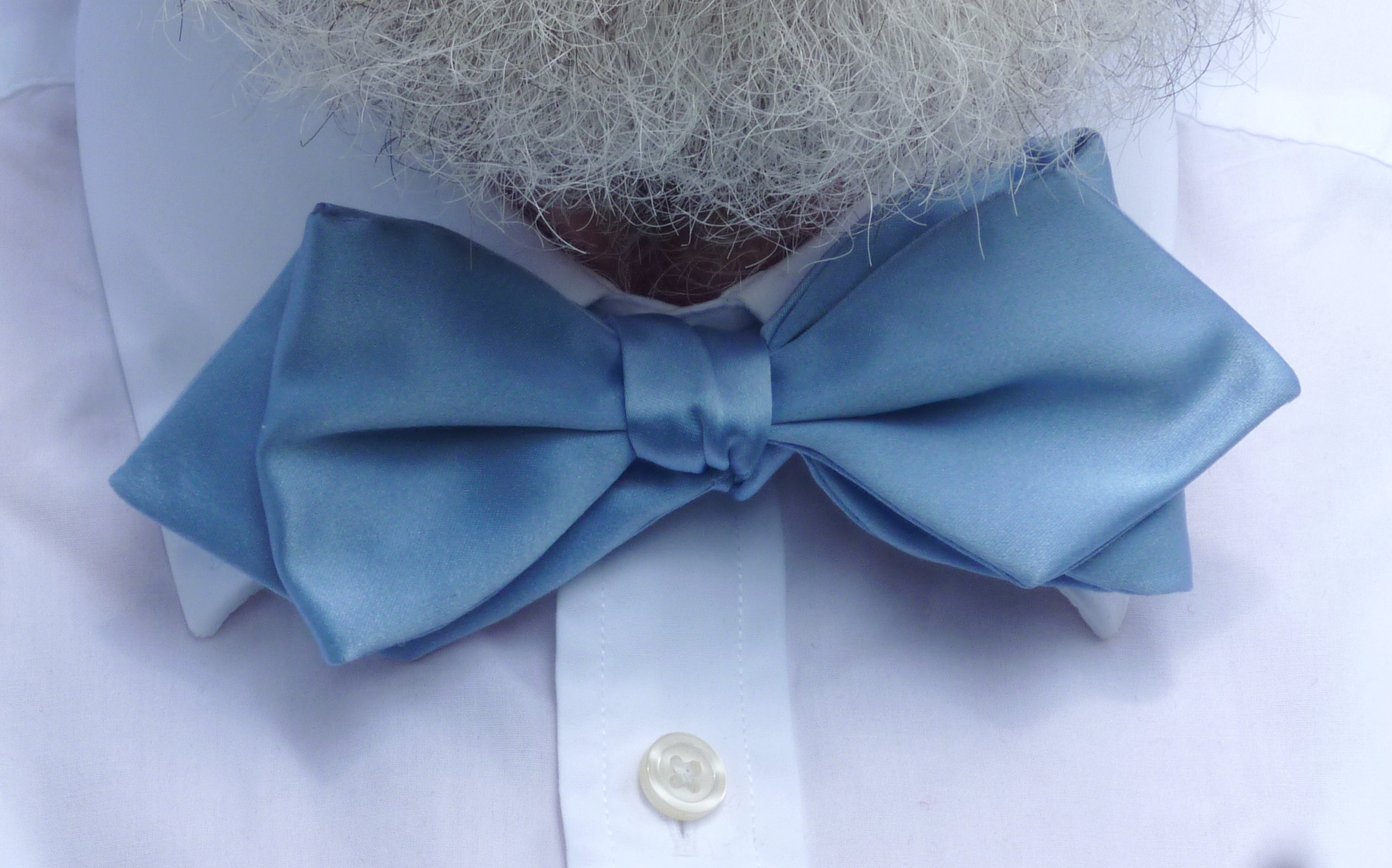
Bow tie, type Diamond Point, silk

=== Pre-tie ===
Shown below on the right is one style of pre-tie/ready-tie bow tie. Wearing a ready-tied bow tie at formal occasions requiring a black or white tie dress code is usually considered a faux pas, though at occasions such as Schools Leavers' Proms or ones at which the participants are unlikely to have had much experience wearing bow ties, it may be commonplace.

As shown in the pictures below, another type of ready-tie bow tie is the wooden bow tie, a fairly new product made mostly in the U.S and Canada. Other materials are also in use. An example would be bow ties that are made of natural bird feathers; this too is a fairly new product made mostly in the U.S. and Europe (in Poland).

Pre-Tie Bows

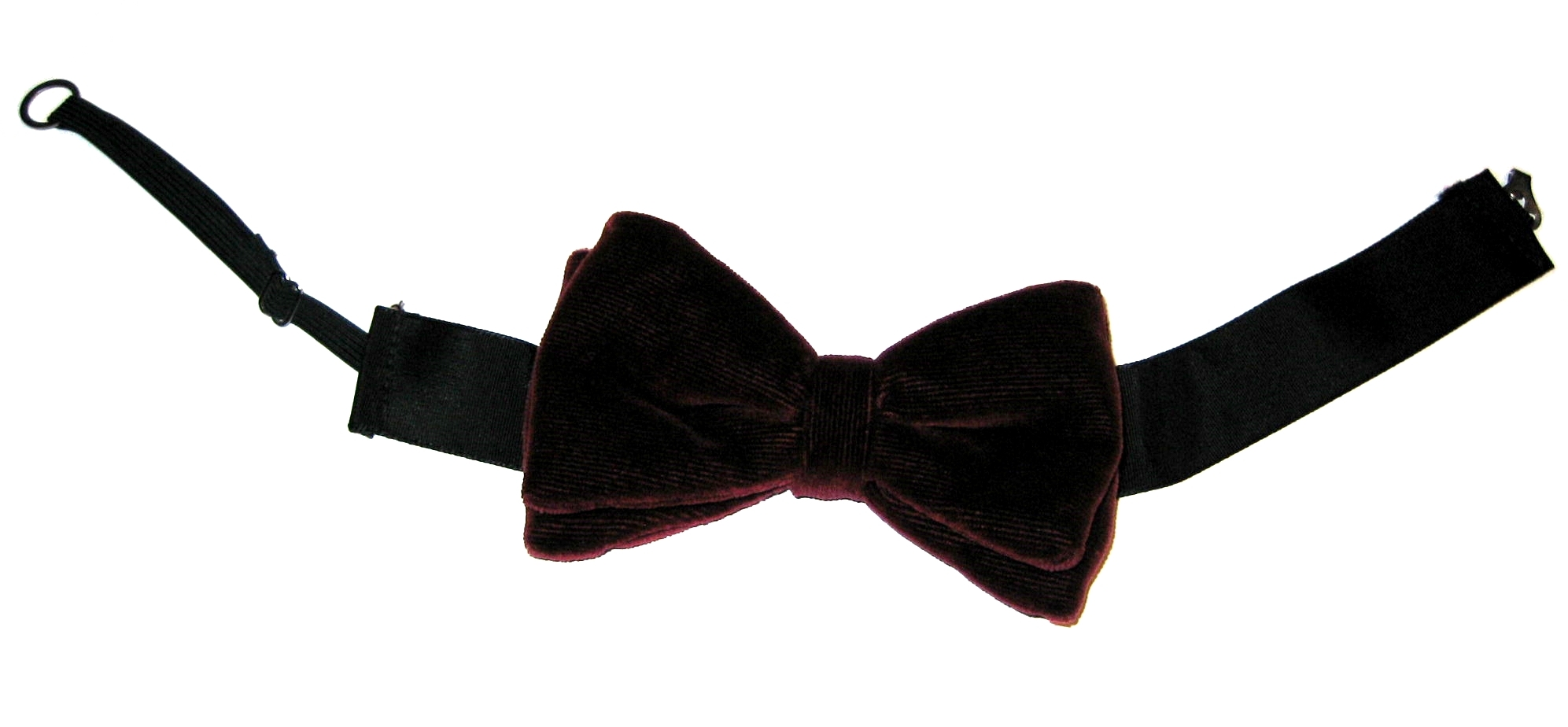
A pre-tied bow tie

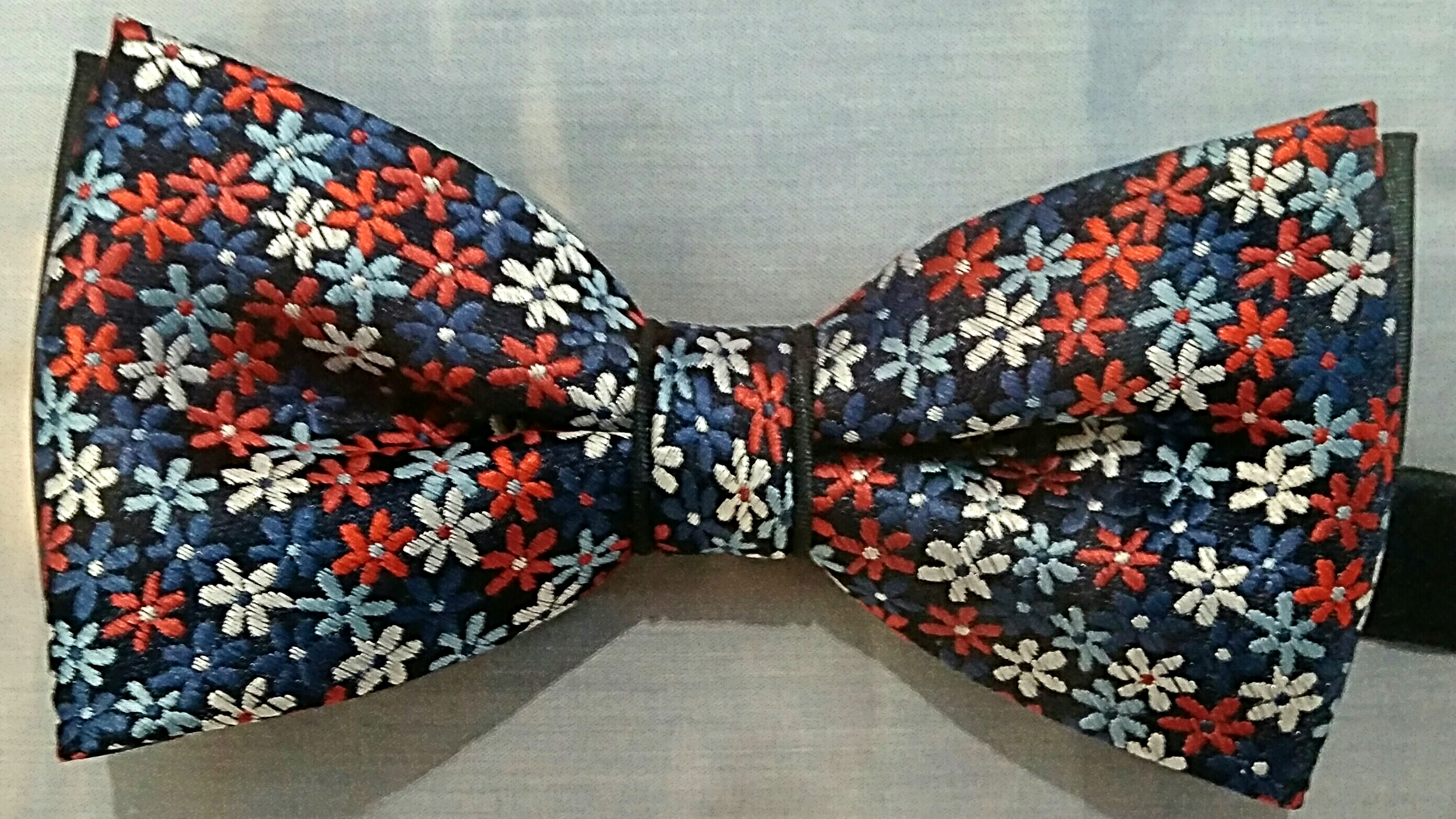
Informal bow tie

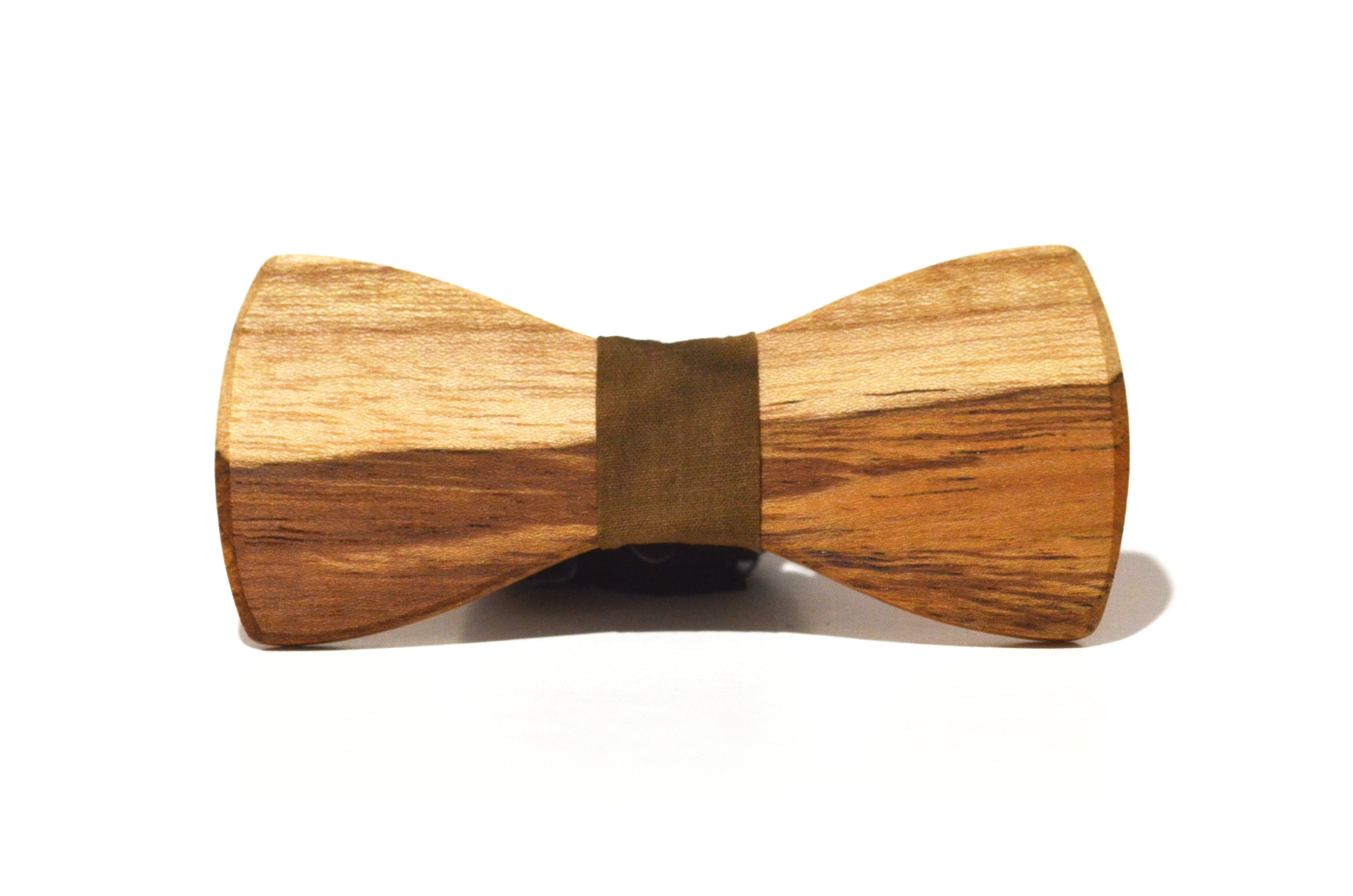
Wooden bow tie, made in Canada and U.S

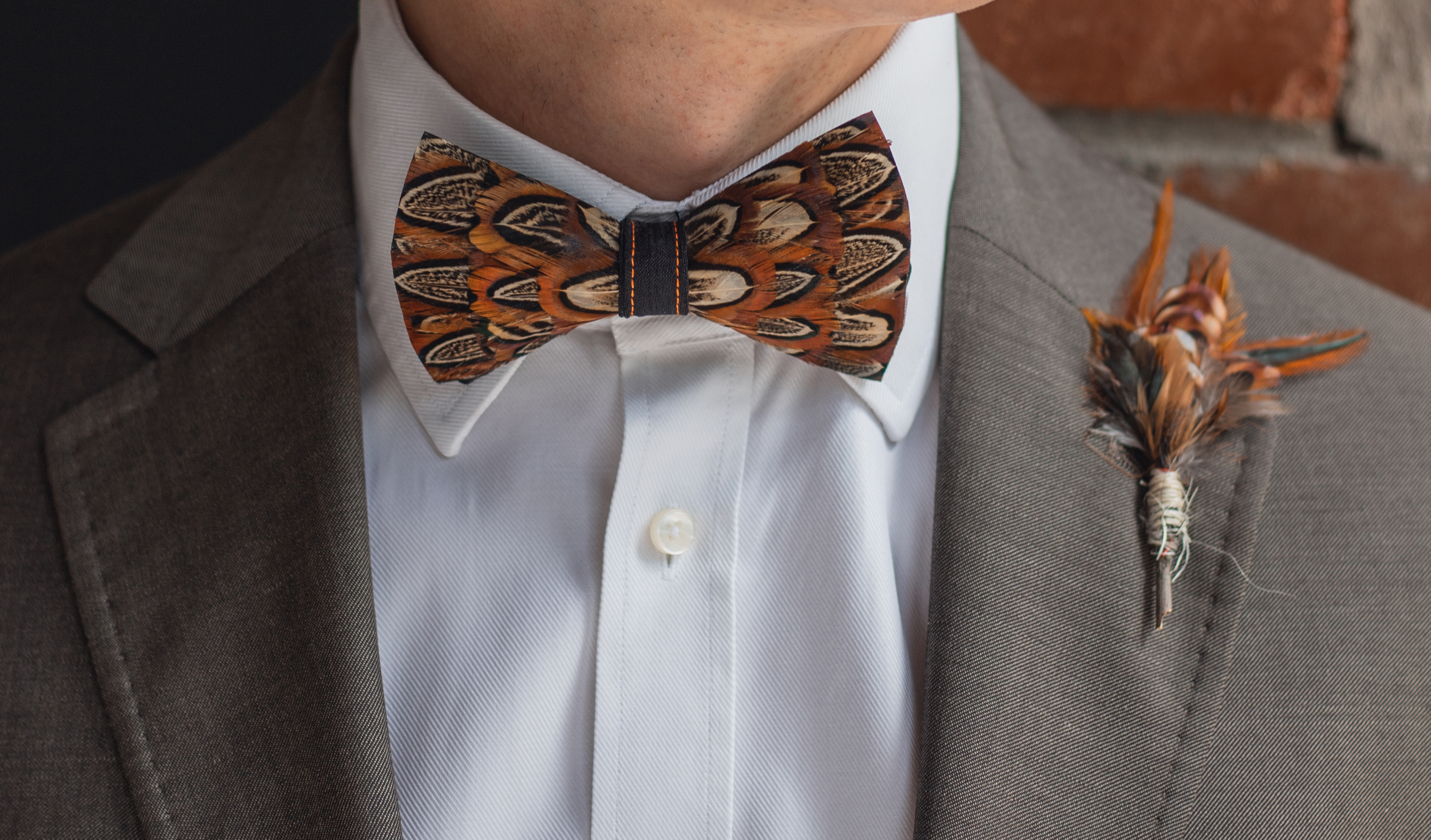
Bow tie made of feathers, made in Poland

=== Clip-on ===
A clip-on does not go around the neck but clips directly to the collar points. These are sometimes referred to as ‘Lido Grip’ bow ties due to the type of clip technology used in them, these were common in the 1950s and 1960s.

=== Continental or crossover ===
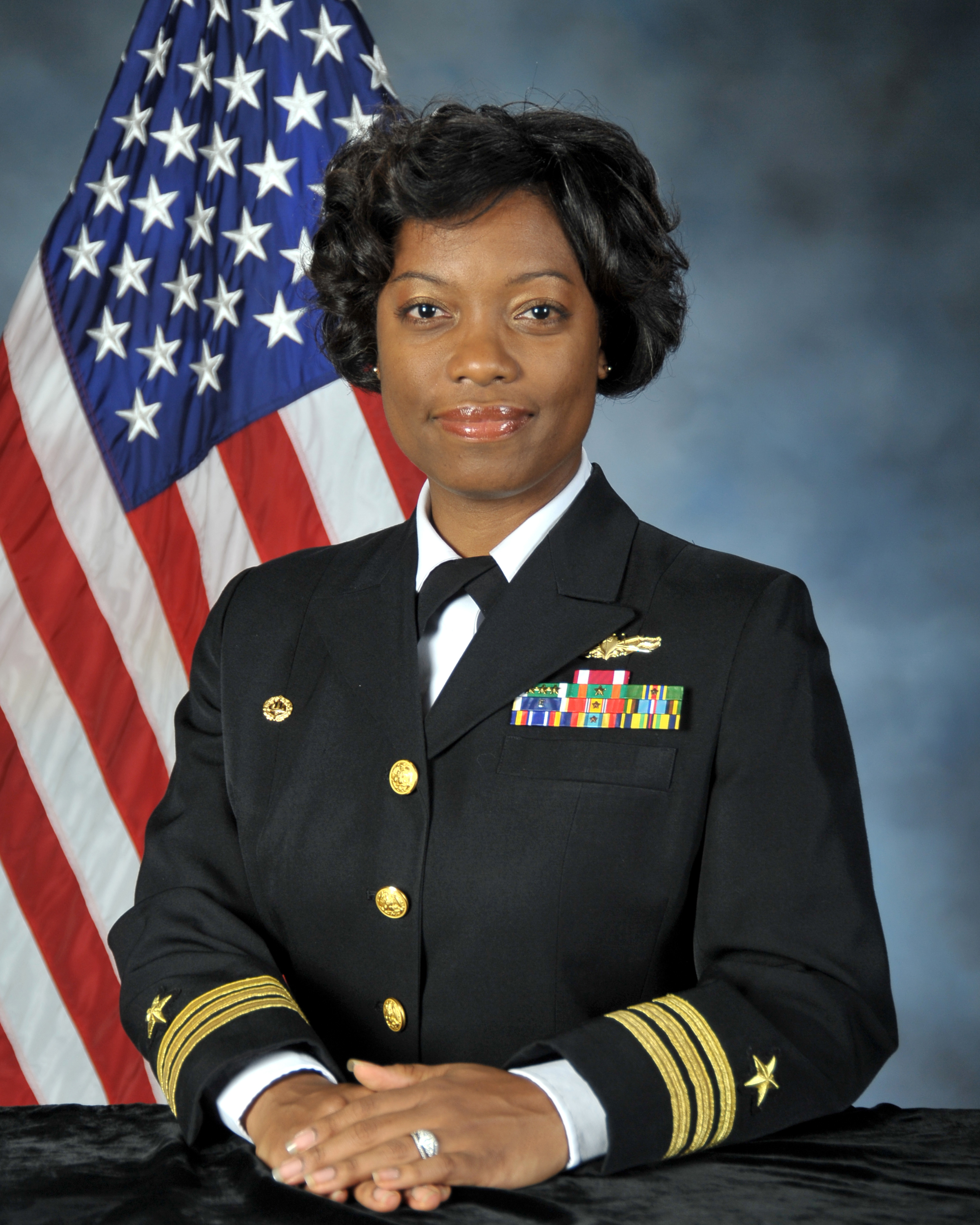
A continental tie worn on a US Navy uniform

A continental tie, also called a crossover tie, is a type of bow tie partly covered by the dress shirt collar.

== Gallery ==
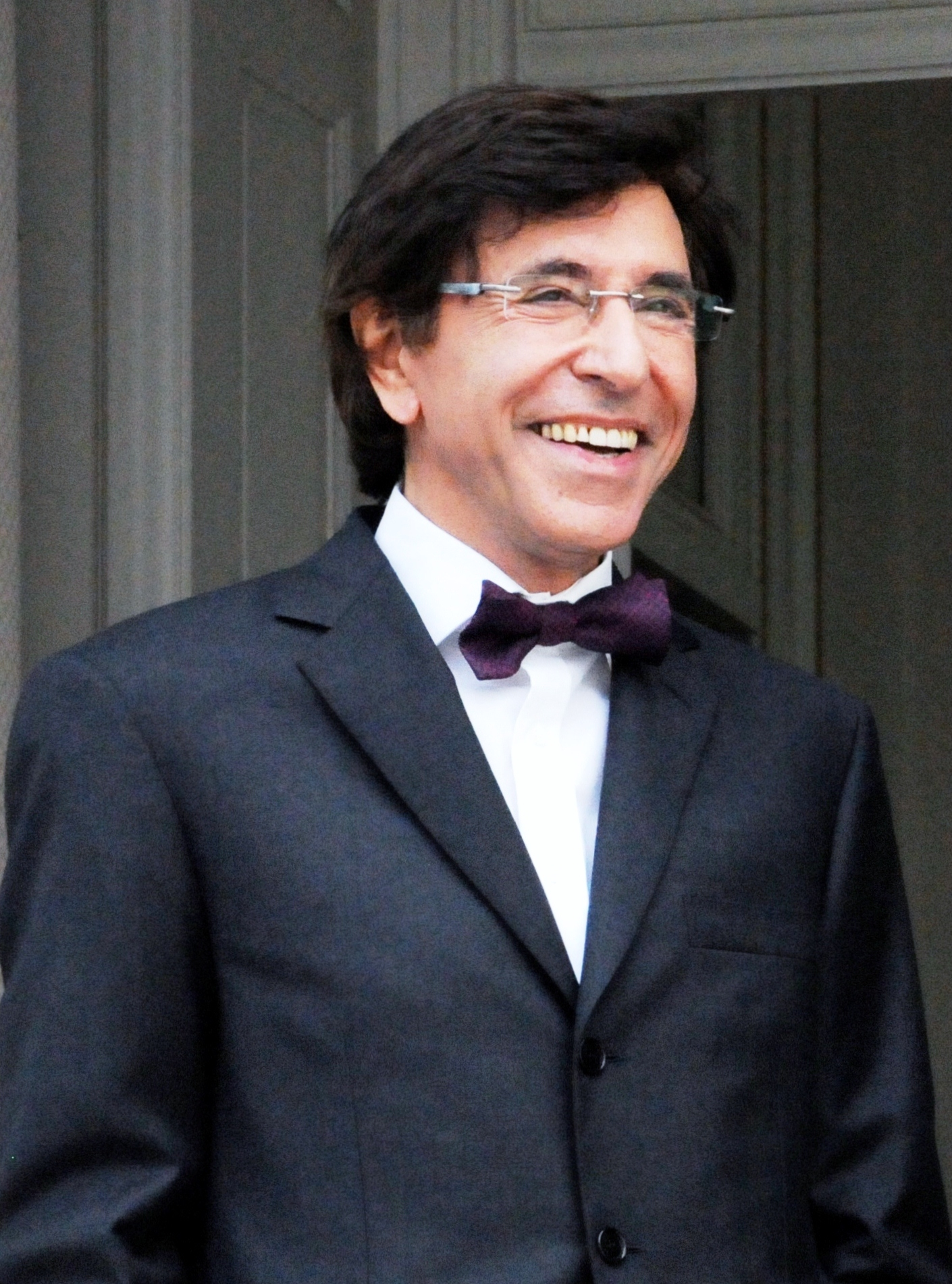
Elio Di Rupo, former Prime Minister of Belgium, is a regular wearer of bow ties.

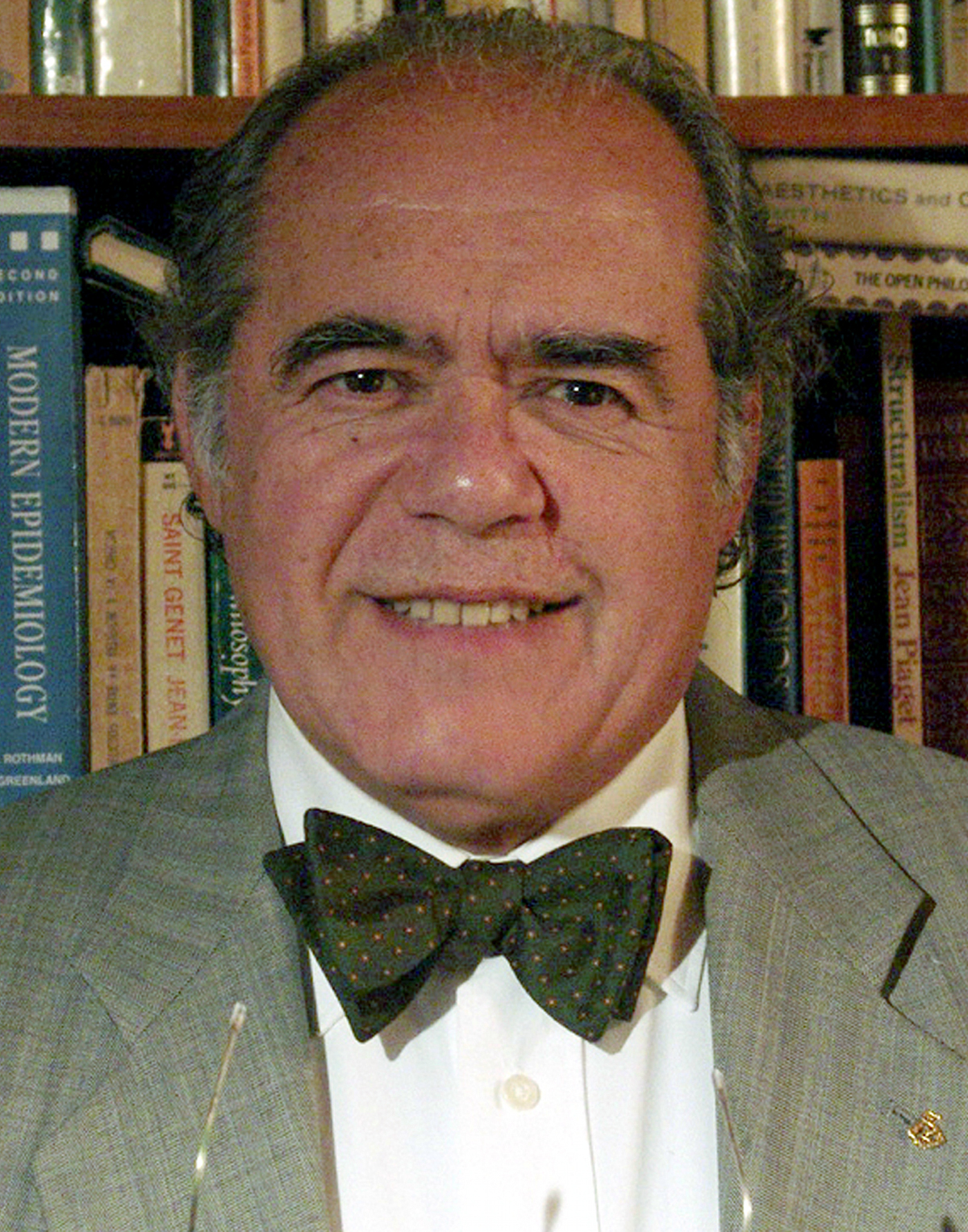
Marcello Ferrada de Noli, professor emeritus, Sweden, frequently wears self-tied bow ties.

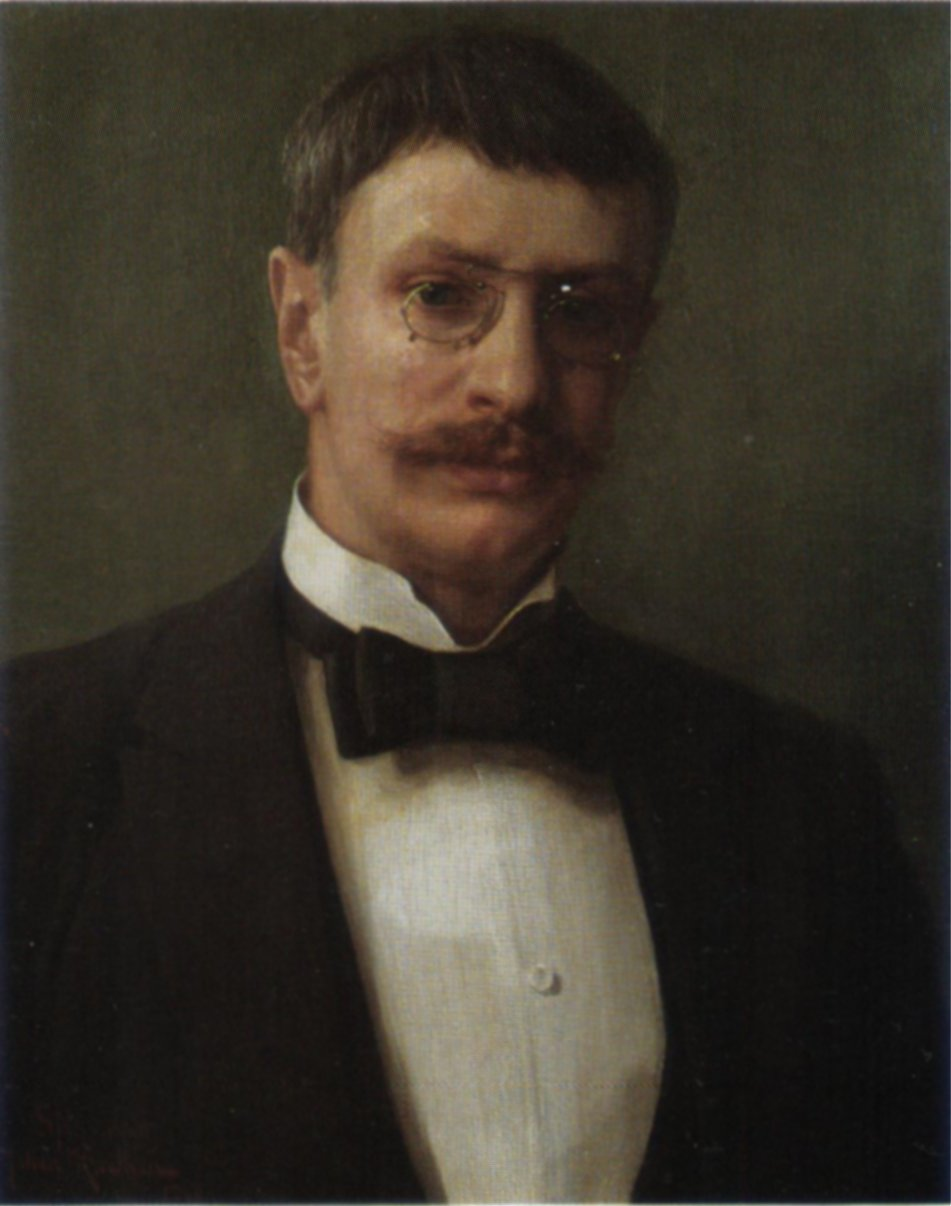
Johan Krouthén wearing a 19th-century style bow tie.

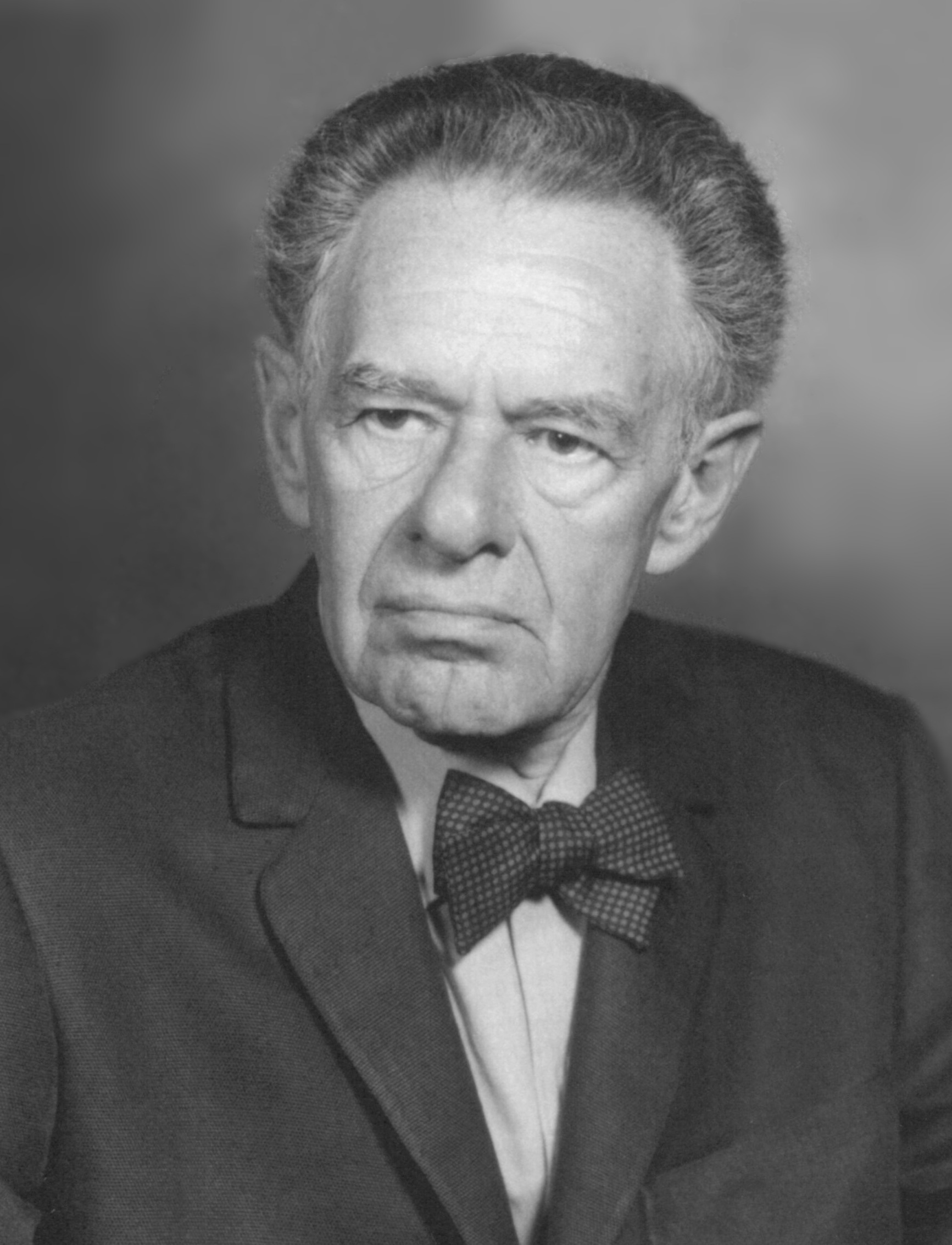
Professor Fritz Albert Lipmann, Harvard Medical School, wore a self-tied bow tie.

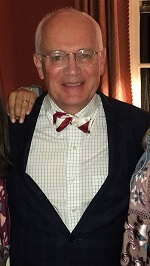
Michael Maxey, president of Roanoke College, is well known for wearing bow-ties.

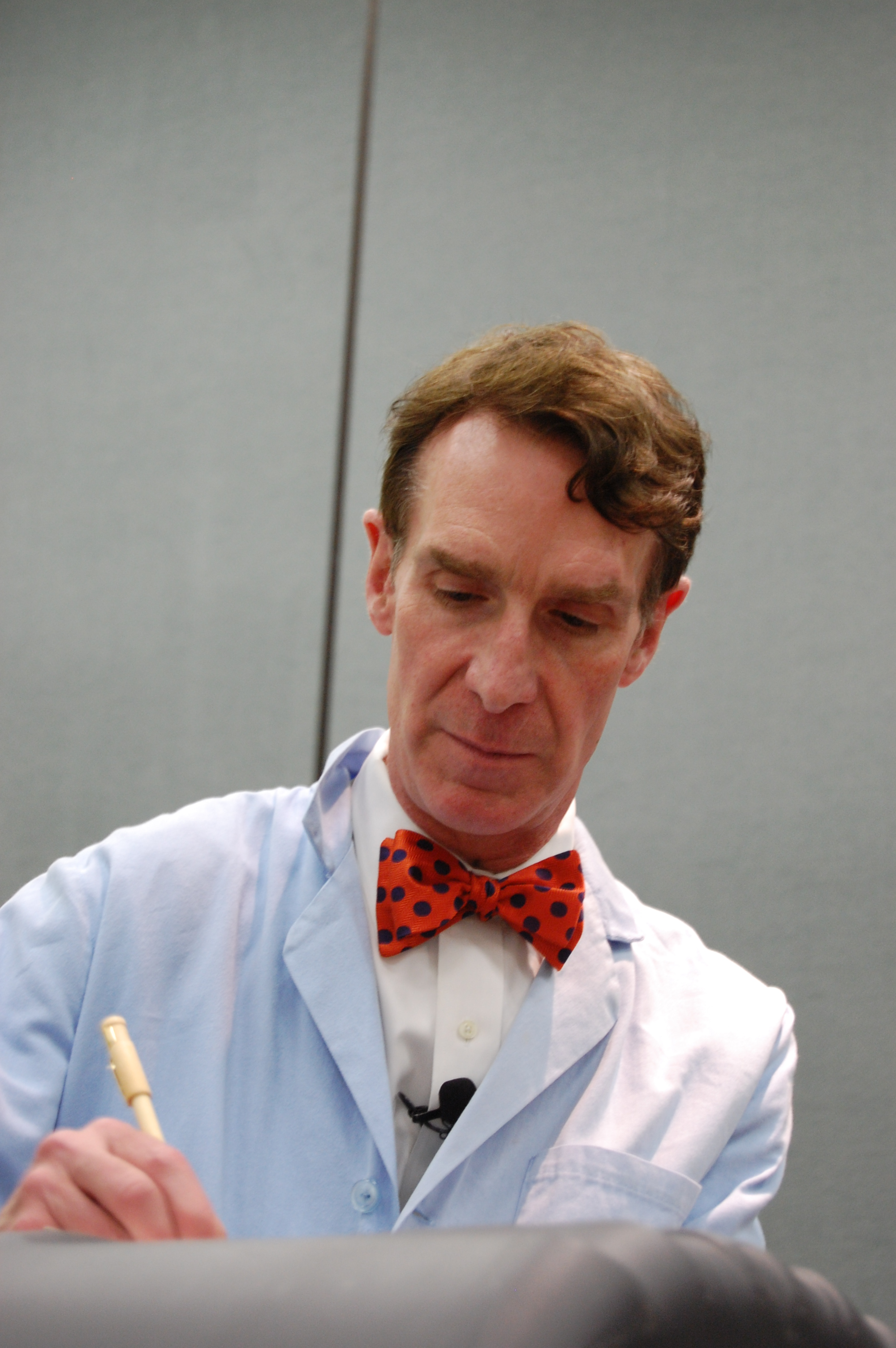
Bill Nye, on his show, wore a powder blue lab coat and bow tie.

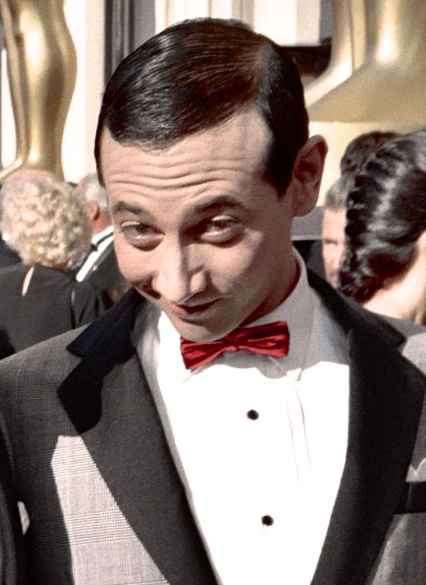
Paul Reubens as Pee-wee Herman wore a trademark red bow tie.

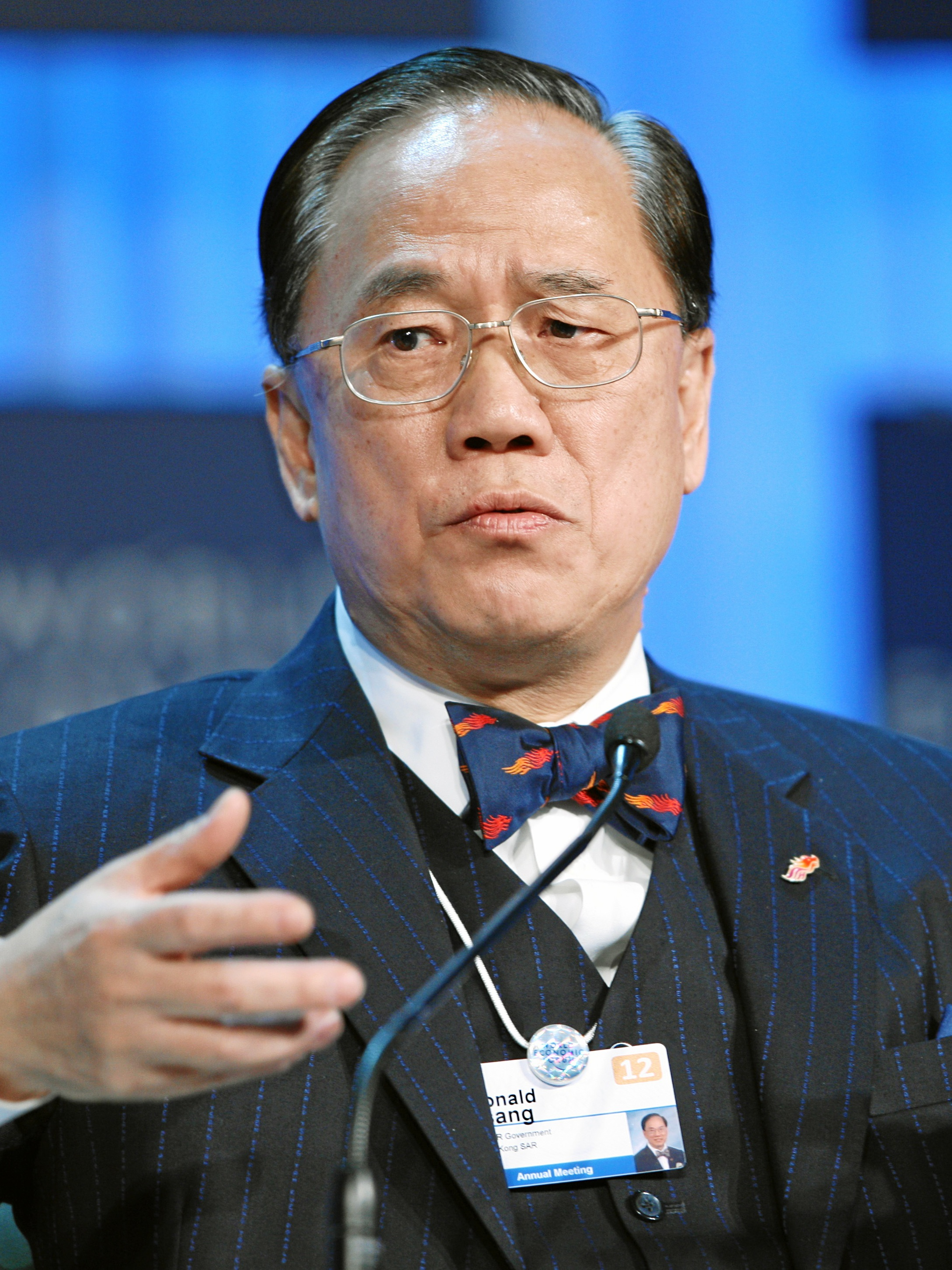
Donald Tsang, former Chief Executive of Hong Kong, is well known for wearing self-tied bow ties.
