= 4am Friday =

Studio album by Avail
- Released: May 10, 1996
- Recorded: January–February 1996 at Uncle Punchy Studio, Silver Spring, Maryland
- Genre: Punk rock, hardcore punk, melodic hardcore
- Label: Lookout!

Avail chronology
Dixie (1994)	4am Friday (1996)	Live at the Bottom of the Hill in San Francisco (1998)

Professional ratings
Review scores
Source	Rating
AllMusic	4/5 stars
Pitchfork Media	8.3/10

4am Friday is the third studio album by Avail. It is named after the day and time the band received news of Bob Baynor's death (of the band Maximillian Colby). The song "F.C.A." was also written about Bob. It was released in 1996 on Lookout! Records and reissued in 2006 by Jade Tree Records. The reissue also includes the Live at the Bottom of the Hill in San Francisco album. The song "Simple Song" was featured in the 2002 skateboarding video game Tony Hawk's Pro Skater 4.

== Track listing ==
No.	Title	Length
1.	"Simple Song"	3:12
2.	"Order"	1:36
3.	"Tuesday"	2:29
4.	"92"	1:41
5.	"McCarthy"	2:27
6.	"(Ben)"	0:31
7.	"Monroe Park"	1:28
8.	"Armchair"	1:34
9.	"Fix"	2:07
10.	"Blue Ridge"	2:34
11.	"Swing Low"	1:13
12.	"F.C.A."	1:44
13.	"Hang"	2:44
14.	"Governor"	1:58
15.	"Nameless"	2:42

2006 Re-Release Bonus Tracks
No.	Title	Length
16.	"South Bound 95"	1:32
17.	"Stride"	2:55
18.	"Order"	1:46
19.	"Tuning"	2:31
20.	"Fix"	2:12
21.	"FCA"	2:24
22.	"Pinned Up"	2:41
23.	"Nickel Bridge"	1:46
24.	"Simple Song"	3:07
25.	"Clone"	2:19
26.	"Nameless"	3:22
27.	"Scuffle Town"	1:19
28.	"Blue Ridge"	3:55
29.	"Virus"	2:35
30.	"Model"	3:54
