= Who's to Say What Stays the Same =

EP by Avail
- Released: 1989, May 1991
- Recorded: December 1989
- Genre: Punk rock
- Length: 12:14
- Label: SunSpot Records
- Producer: Joe Banks

Rear cover
- The rear cover of the EP

Who's to Say What Stays the Same is the first extended play by Avail and their first release on vinyl in May 1991. The four songs that make up the album were taken from their second release, "Reaching Out" originally released on cassette in 1990. The recording of this album took place during December 1989 at Inner Ear Studio.

== Line up ==
- Brien Stewart - vocals
- Joe Banks -guitar
- Tim Barry - drums
- D.J. Grimes - bass

== Track listing ==
No.	Title	Length
1.	"Back to the Start"	3:08
2.	"Regulation '89"	2:30
3.	"No Fixed Address"	3:16
4.	"Shine"	3:18
Total length:		12:14
