= Avail =

American punk rock band

- Origin: Reston, Virginia, U.S.
- Genres: Melodic hardcore, punk rock, hardcore punk
- Years active: 1987–2007, 2019–present
- Labels: Jade Tree Records; Fat Wreck; Lookout! Records
- Members: Tim Barry; Joe Banks; Gwomper; Erik Larson; Beau Beau
- Past members: Brien Stewart; Doug Crosby; Ed Trask; Chuck McCauley
- Website: availrichmond.com

Avail is an American melodic hardcore band from Richmond, Virginia. Originally from Reston, Virginia, the band formed in 1987, its members including Joe Banks, Doug Crosby, Brien Stewart, and Mikey Warstler. The only original remaining member, guitar player Joe Banks, teamed up with rival band LDK's (Learning Disabled Kids) Tim Barry. They moved to Richmond in 1990, and soon, after numerous line up changes, put together a solid lineup to release their first album Satiate in 1992. Many of their lyrics center on Richmond. The band released six studio albums.

The band has never officially disbanded, but has not released any new material since 2002 and stopped playing live shows in 2007.

On March 26, 2019, the band announced a reunion show at The National in Richmond, Virginia, scheduled for July 19. Since then, they have played multiple shows and continue to tour. There are currently no plans to release any new material.

They cited influences including Leatherface, Embrace, Rites of Spring, Squirrel Bait, Dag Nasty, Naked Raygun, Hüsker Dü, Born Against, Black Flag, Minor Threat, Ramones, John Mellencamp, Woody Guthrie and Bruce Springsteen.

== Members ==
Current

- Tim Barry - vocals
- Joe Banks - guitar
- Justin "Gwomper" Burdick - bass
- Erik Larson - drums
- Beau Beau Butler - cheerleader

Former members

- Brien Stewart - vocals
- Chuck McCauley - bass
- Robert Kelshian - bass
- DJ Grimes - bass
- Doug Crosby - drums
- Mikey Warstler - bass
- Ed Trask- drums

== Label change ==
Avail self-released their first LP, Satiate on Catheter-Assembly Records. It was later re-released by Lookout! Records. They released several studio releases on Lookout! and then went on to Fat Wreck Chords for One Wrench and Front Porch Stories. Most recently, they have signed on with Jade Tree Records who has recently re-released the Avail albums Dixie, 4am Friday, and Over the James.

== Legacy in Richmond ==
Tim Barry is currently writing and performing solo music. Joe Banks, Chuck McCauley and Erik Larson have teamed up in the band Freeman.

== Discography ==
=== Albums ===
- Satiate - 1992 - Lookout! Records
- Dixie - 1994 - Lookout! Records
- 4am Friday - 1996 - Lookout! Records
- Over the James - 1998 - Lookout! Records
- One Wrench - 2000 - Fat Wreck Chords
- Front Porch Stories - 2002 - Fat Wreck Chords

=== Live albums ===
- Live at the Kings Head Inn - 1993 - Old Glory Records
- Live at the Bottom of the Hill in San Francisco - 1998 - Lookout! Records
- V.M. Live Presents...Avail - 1999 - Liberation Records

=== Demo albums ===
- Each Other - 1988
- Reaching Out - 1989

=== EPs ===
- Who's to Say What Stays the Same - 1991 - Sunspot Records
- Attempt to Regress - 1993 - Catheter Assembly
- The Fall of Richmond - 1997 - Lookout! Records - split EP with (Young) Pioneers
- 100 Times - 1999 - Fat Wreck Chords

=== Music videos ===
- "Simple Song" (1996)
- "West Wye" (2002)
