= Grantchester knot =

Self-releasing, asymmetric way of tying a necktie

The Grantchester knot is a self-releasing, asymmetric way of tying a necktie. Using the notation presented in The 85 Ways to Tie a Tie, it is a Lo Ri Lo Ri Co Li, finishing with Ro Li Co T.

Grantchester knot instructions

Lo beginning

Ri

Lo

Ri

Co, Li

Ro Li Co T end.
