= One Wrench =

Studio album by Avail
- Released: June 20, 2000
- Recorded: March 2000
- Studios: Montana, Richmond, Virginia
- Genre: Hardcore punk
- Label: Fat Wreck Chords

Avail chronology
Over the James (1998)	One Wrench (2000)	Front Porch Stories (2002)

One Wrench is Avail's fifth studio album, released in 2000. It was their first album for Fat Wreck Chords.

== Critical reception ==
Professional ratings
Review scores
Source	Rating
AllMusic	4/5 stars
The Encyclopedia of Popular Music	4/5 stars

The Pittsburgh Post-Gazette called the album "another high-intensity collection from [the] undersung working-class heroes."

== Track listing ==
1. "Fast One" – 2:03
2. "Taken" – 2:35
3. "N30" – 2:16
4. "Leveled" – 2:22
5. "New Song" – 2:23
6. "High Lonesome" – 3:02
7. "Invisible" – 2:48
8. "Union" – 2:23
9. "Heron" – 2:29
10. "Rest" – 1:54
11. "C. Days" – 2:04
12. "Bell" – 3:00
13. "Leather" – 1:24
14. "Old Dominion" – 2:37

== Production ==
- Engineer, Producer - Mark Miley
- Mastered by Bill McElroy
