= Over the James =

Studio album by Avail
- Released: April 7, 1998
- Recorded: December 1997 at Montana Studio, Richmond, Virginia
- Genre: Melodic hardcore
- Length: 32:52
- Label: Lookout!

Avail chronology
Live at the Bottom of the Hill in San Francisco (1998)	Over the James (1998)	One Wrench (2000)

Professional ratings
Review scores
Source	Rating
Allmusic	3/5 stars
Pitchfork Media	7.7/10

Over the James is the fourth studio album by punk rock band Avail. It was released in 1998 on Lookout! Records. The album was re-released in 2006 by Jade Tree Records. The re-release contains the songs from Avail's split record with the (Young) Pioneers, as well as two tracks recorded for compilations.

== Reception and legacy ==
Brian Raftery of AllMusic gave Over the James a three star review praising cuts like "Sanctuary 13" and "August" but noting the band's stagnation. Zach Baron of Pitchfork gave the album 7.7 out of 10 praising the album's production, stating: "slicker, slower, longer-- epic, sorta pretentious-- but also the apotheosis of their sound, more or less: All chorus, all the time".

In May 2019, Decibel inducted Over the James into their Hall of Fame, calling it a melodic hardcore classic that was popular among emo and metal fans alike.

== Track listing ==
All tracks by Avail.

No.	Title	Length
1.	"Deepwood"	2:00
2.	"New #2"	2:25
3.	"August"	2:32
4.	"Fall Apart"	1:52
5.	"Nickel Bridge"	2:15
6.	"Scuffle Town"	1:18
7.	"Sanctuary 13"	2:25
8.	"S.R.O."	2:02
9.	"Mid-Town West"	2:25
10.	"Lombardy St."	2:28
11.	"Vine"	1:43
12.	"Cross Tie"	3:52
13.	"Ask"	2:16
14.	"Fifth Wheel"	3:13
Total length:		32:52

=== 2006 Re-Release Bonus Tracks ===
15. "Lombardy Street (Acoustic)"
16. "You May Be Right" (Billy Joel Cover)
17. "Suspicious Minds" (Elvis Presley Cover)
18. "Said Gun" (Embrace Cover)

== Personnel ==
- Tim Barry – lead vocals
- Beau Beau Butler – backing vocals
- Joe Banks – guitars
- Justin "Gwomper" Burdick – bass
- Erik Larson – drums
