= Dixie (album) =

Studio album by Avail
- Released: September 23, 1994
- Recorded: June 1994 at Uncle Punchy Studios, Silver Spring, Maryland
- Genres: Punk rock, hardcore punk, melodic hardcore
- Label: Lookout! Records

Avail chronology
Satiate (1992)	Dixie (1994)	4am Friday (1996)

Professional ratings
Review scores
Source	Rating
Allmusic	4/5 stars
Pitchfork Media	(7.8/10)

Dixie is the second studio album by the punk rock band Avail. It was released in 1994 on Lookout! Records. The album was re-released in 2006 on Jade Tree Records. Also included on the re-released disc was the Attempt to Regress 7" and Live at the Kings Head Inn.

== Track listing ==
All tracks by Avail

1. "On the Nod" - 2:06
2. "Clone" - 2:40
3. "Tuning" - 2:42
4. "Song" - 2:07
5. "Sidewalk" - 1:55
6. "25 Years" - 3:47
7. "Virus" - 2:58
8. "Beliefs Pile" - 3:05
9. "Treading on Heels" - 3:00
10. "Model" - 3:35
11. "South Bound 95" - 1:42
12. "Pink Houses" (John Mellencamp cover) - 3:18

== 2006 Re-Release Bonus Tracks ==
13. "Connection"
14. "Mr. Morgan"
15. "Sidewalk"
16. "Stride"
17. "Song"
18. "Observations"
19. "Predictible"
20. "Forgotten"
21. "Pinned Up"
22. "Kiss Off"
23. "Connection"
