= Half-Windsor knot =

Necktie knot

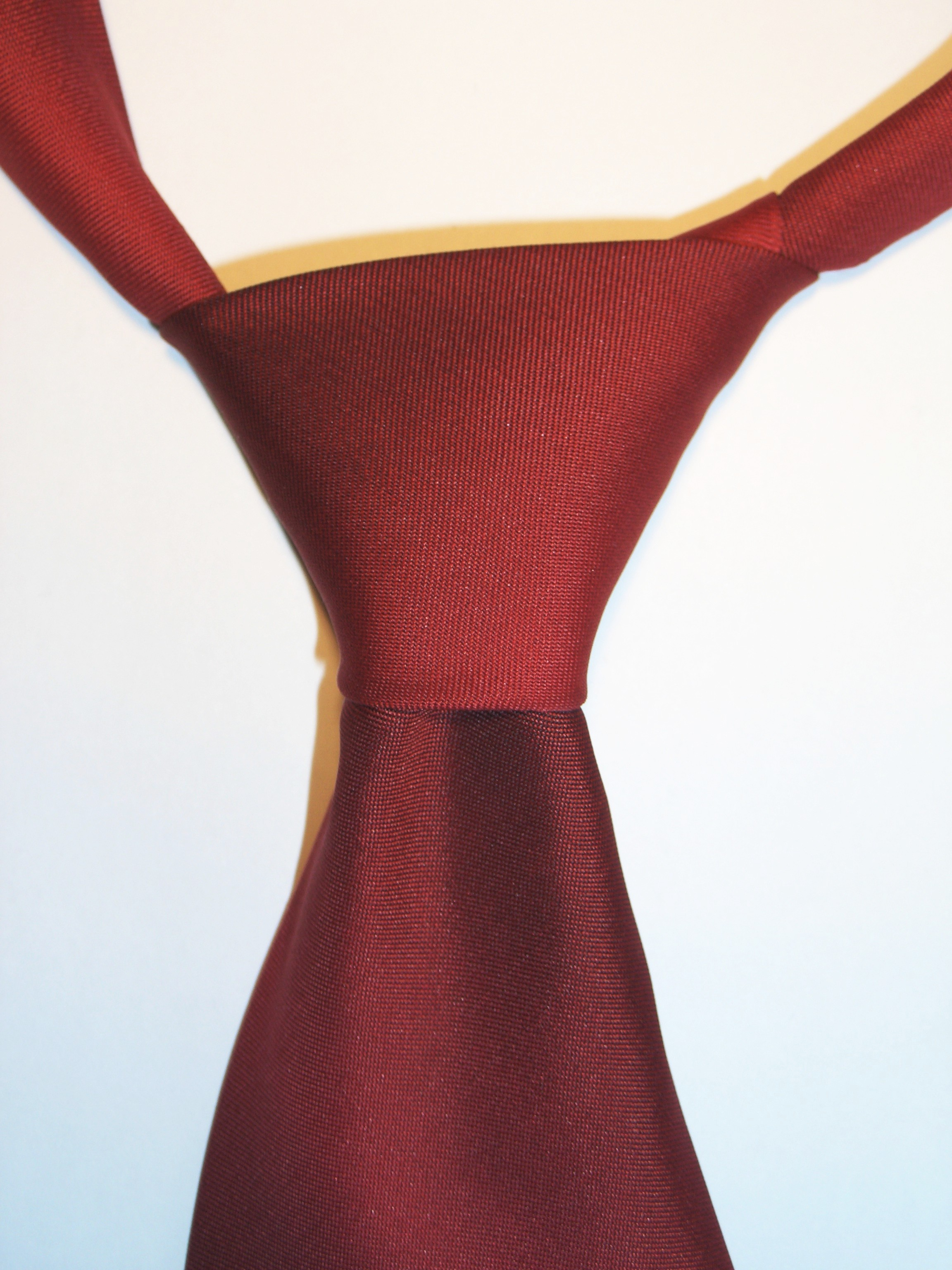

The half-Windsor knot, also known as the single Windsor knot, is a way of tying a necktie which produces a neat, triangular knot. It is larger than the four-in-hand knot and Pratt knot, but smaller than the Windsor knot. The half-Windsor is derived from the Windsor in that it is only brought up around the loop on one side rather than both. It works well with light- and medium-weight fabrics.

== Tying ==
According to The 85 Ways to Tie a Tie, the knot is tied thus:

- Li Ro Ci Lo Ri Co T (knot 7)

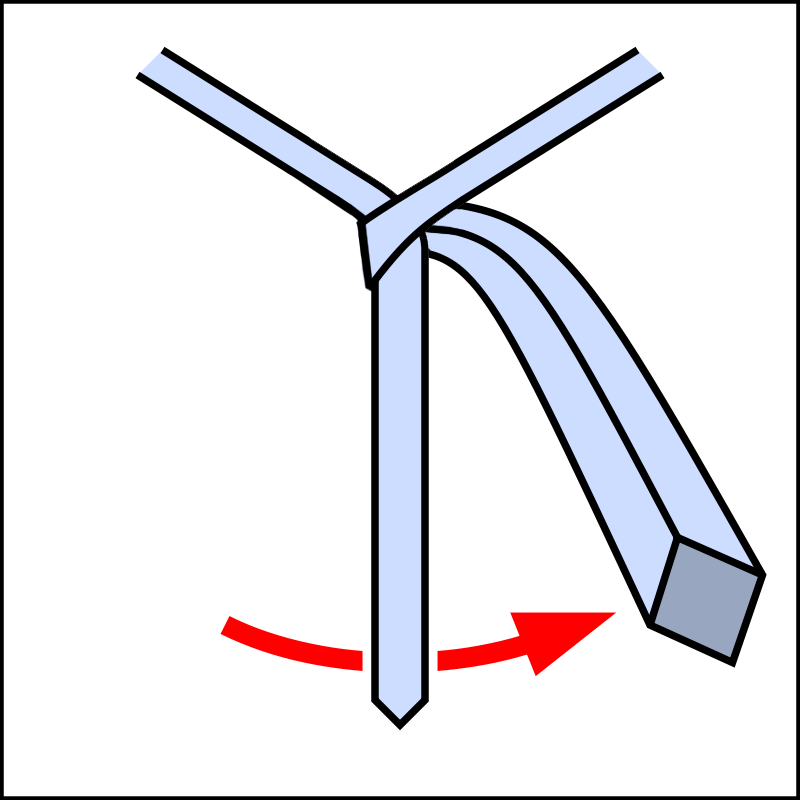

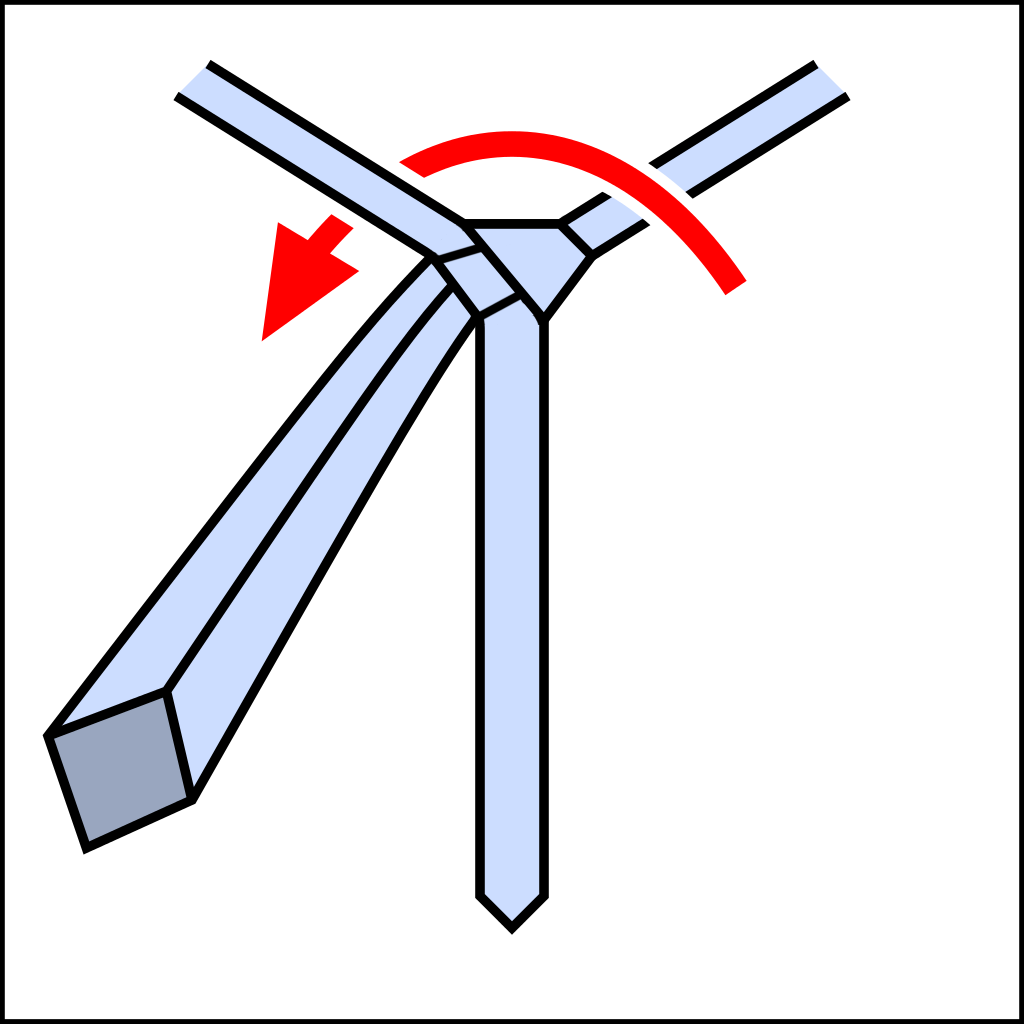

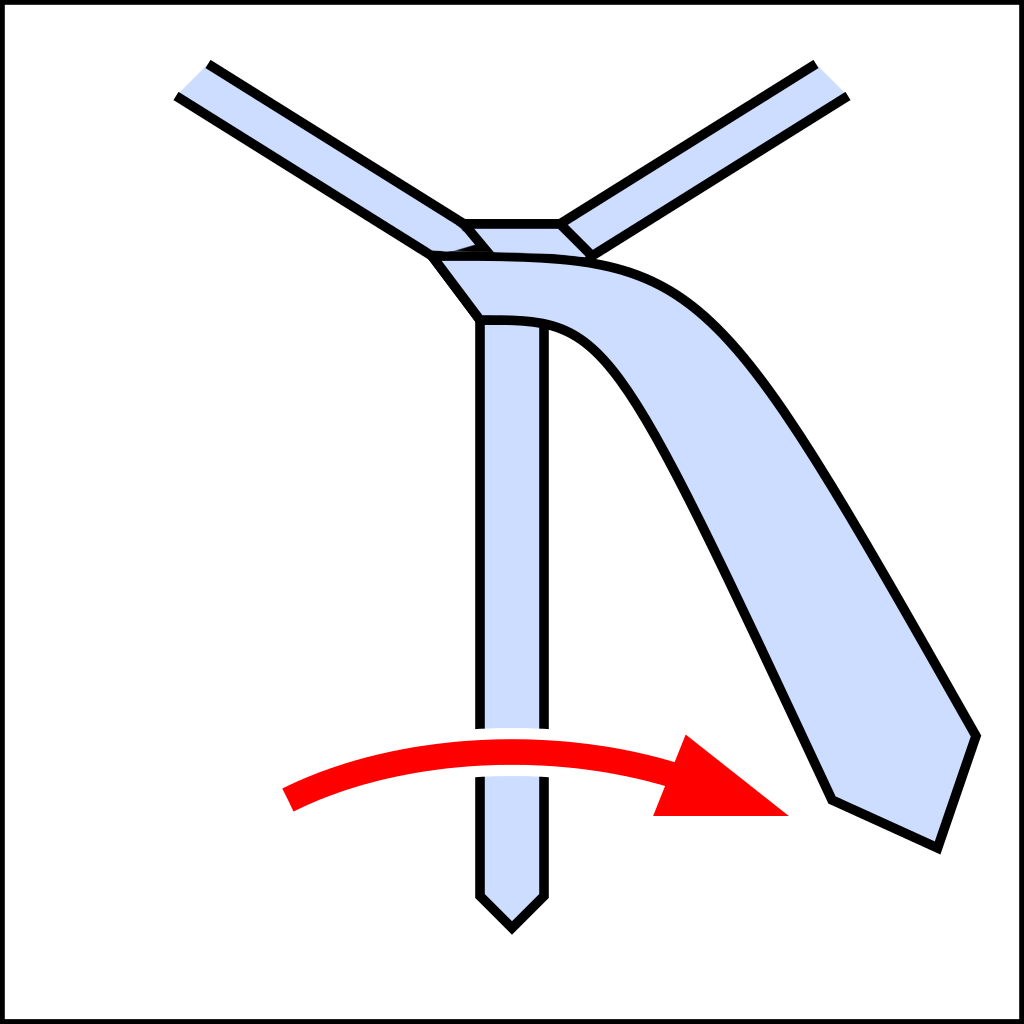

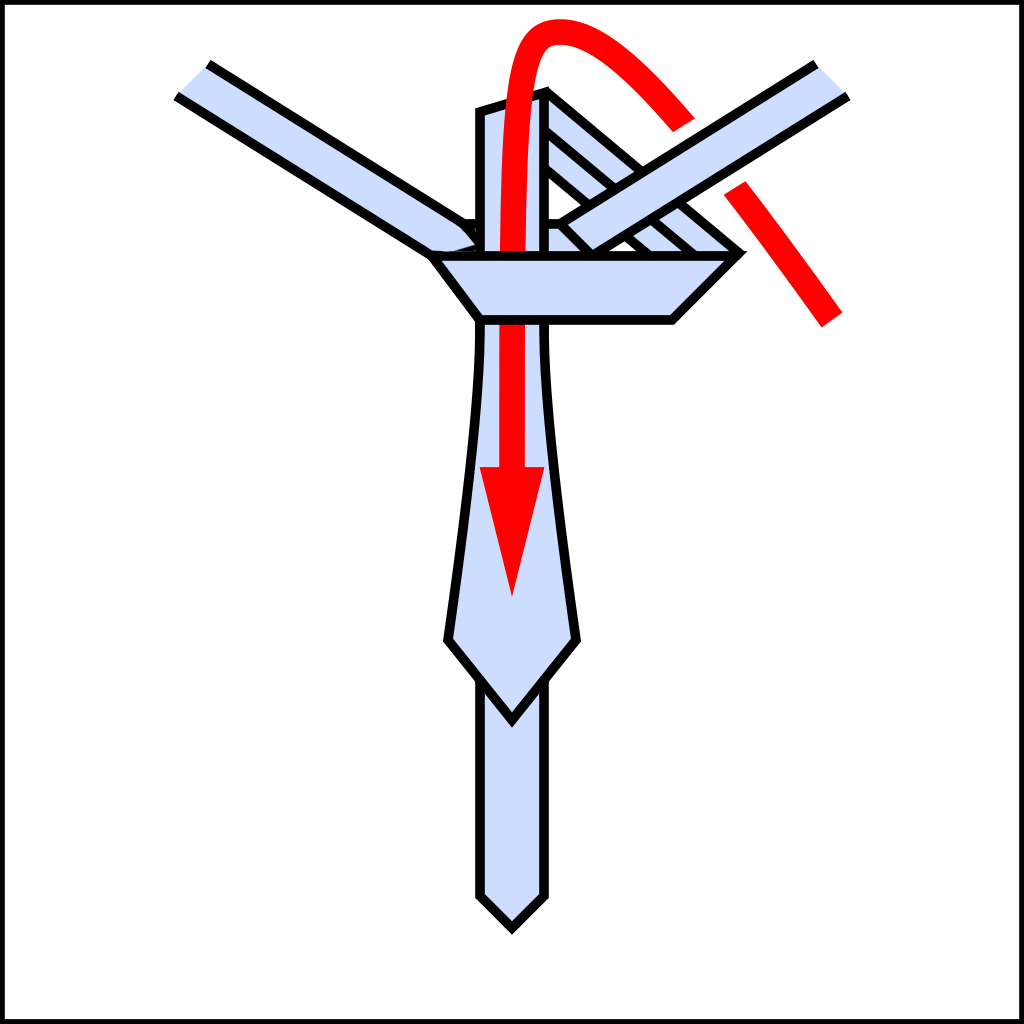

with a common self-releasing variation being

- Li Ro Ci Ro Li Co T (knot 8)

== See also ==
- Windsor knot – a bulkier knot
- Four-in-hand knot
- List of knots
