= Windsor knot =

Necktie knot

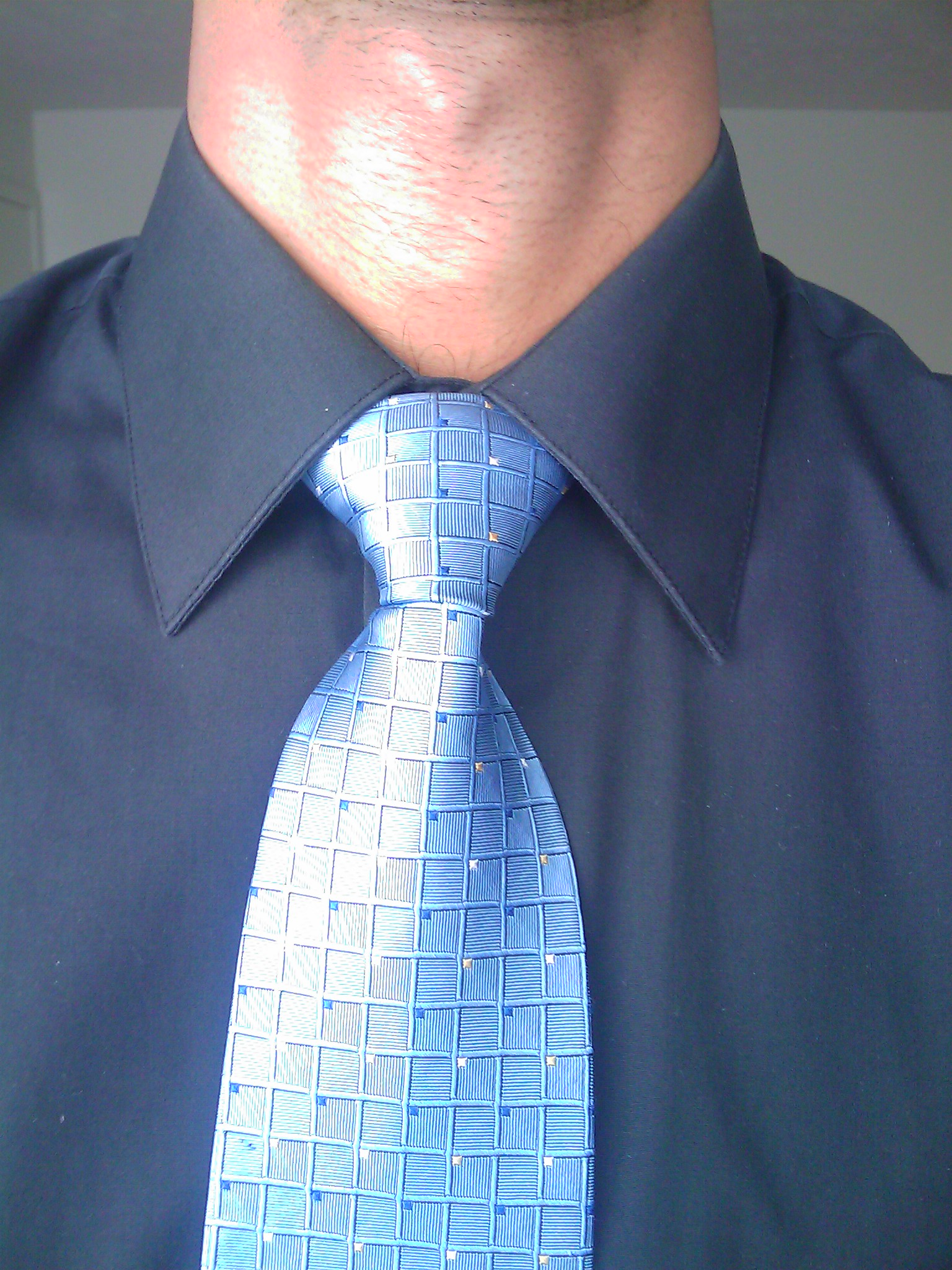

The Windsor knot, sometimes referred to as a full Windsor (or misleadingly as a double Windsor) to distinguish it from the half-Windsor, is a knot used to tie a necktie. As with other common necktie knots, the Windsor knot is triangular, and the wide end of the tie drapes in front of the narrow end. The Windsor is a wider knot than most common knots, and while not truly symmetric is more balanced than the common four-in-hand knot. The Windsor's width makes it especially suited to be used with a spread or cutaway collar.

== History and adoption ==
The knot is named after the Duke of Windsor. He is sometimes credited with its invention alongside his London shirtmaker. It is however the case that the Duke achieved the wide knot that was his signature by wearing ties of thicker cloth that produced a wider knot from the conventional four-in-hand, and hence the Windsor knot was likely invented to emulate the Duke's wide knots using ties of normal thickness.

It is also the only accepted knot for the SD tie of the RAAF and AAFC in Australia.

The Windsor is notably favored by many United States politicians, such as Donald Trump.

== Specification ==
In the 1999 book The 85 Ways to Tie a Tie, by Thomas Fink and Yong Mao, the Windsor knot is knot 31 and described in that book's notation as:

- Li Co Ri Lo Ci Ro Li Co T

This notation encodes the following series of steps:

1. Start with the tie draped over the neck, with the seam inward and the wide end of the tie to the right.
2. Cross the wide end over the narrow end, bringing it to the left.
3. Bring the wide end inward and up so that it passes under the intersection and out under the neck.
4. Bring the wide end over to the right.
5. Bring the wide end inward and left so that it passes under the intersection and out to the left.
6. Bring the wide end up to the center.
7. Bring the wide end inward and down so that it passes under the intersection and out to the right.
8. Bring the wide end over to the left.
9. Bring the wide end inward and up so that it passes under the intersection and out under the neck.
10. Bring the wide end down and thread it between the front-most horizontal segment and the rest of the knot. Pull both ends gently to tighten.

Common variations on the Windsor include:

- Li Co Li Ro Ci Lo Ri Co T (knot 32) (the "Persian Knot")
- Li Co Ri Lo Ci Lo Ri Co T (knot 33)
- Li Co Li Ro Ci Ro Li Co T (knot 35)

== See also ==
- List of knots
