= Satiate =

Studio album by Avail
- Released: 1992
- Recorded: September–October 1991 at Gizmo Recording Company & Wolftrack Studios
- Genre: Hardcore punk, punk rock
- Length: 38:52
- Label: Catheter-Assembly Records/Lookout! Records/Old Glory Records
- Producer: Avail

Avail chronology
Satiate (1992)	Dixie (1994)

Professional ratings
Review scores
Source	Rating
AllMusic	link

Satiate is the debut album released by Avail in 1992. Satiate was originally released on the band's own Catheter-Assembly Records, then re-released on Old Glory Records later that year. In 1994, Lookout! Records issued the album on CD with two additional tracks, taken from Avail's 7" release Attempt to Regress.

== Track listing ==
No.	Title	Length
1.	"March"	3:20
2.	"All About It"	1:27
3.	"Forgotten"	2:56
4.	"Bob's Crew"	2:15
5.	"Observations"	1:09
6.	"Upward Grind"	4:13
7.	"Stride"	2:54
8.	"Timeframe"	2:35
9.	"Pinned Up"	3:00
10.	"Predictable"	1:21
11.	"Twisted"	5:26
12.	"Hope"	1:43
Total length:		32:17

1994 Reissue
No.	Title	Length
11.	"Connection"	3:35
12.	"Mr. Morgan"	3:00
Total length:		38:52

The song "Mr. Morgan" is named after an elderly Richmond resident who was beaten to death for a few dollars.
