= Four-in-hand knot =

Method of tying a necktie

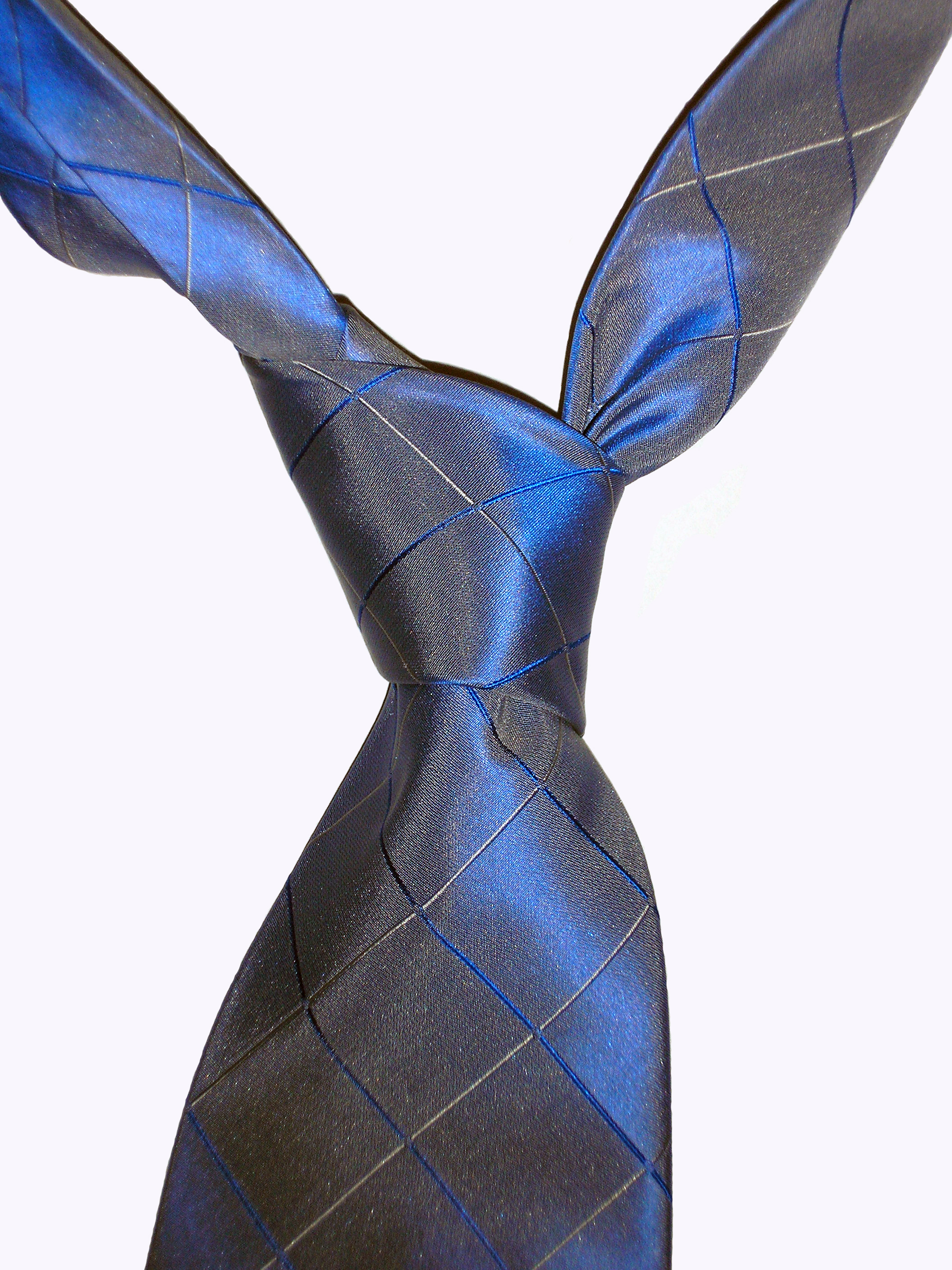
- Names: Four-in-hand knot, Simple knot, schoolboy knot, cravat knot
- Related: Buntline hitch
- ABoK: #2408

The four-in-hand knot is a method of tying a necktie. Also sometimes known (in UK) as a Bucket Knot, due to the shape of the finished knot. Some reports state that carriage drivers tied their reins with a four-in-hand knot, while others claim that the carriage drivers wore their scarves in the manner of a four-in-hand, but the most likely etymology is that members of the Four-in-Hand Club in London began to wear the neckwear, making it fashionable. The knot produced by this method is on the narrow side, notably asymmetric. For United States Army uniforms, and United States Navy uniforms that include a necktie, the four-in-hand knot is one of three prescribed options for tying the necktie, the other two being the half-Windsor and Windsor.

== Tying ==
The four-in-hand knot is tied by placing the tie around the neck and crossing the broad end of the tie in front of the narrow end. The broad end is folded behind the narrow end and brought forward on the opposite side, passed across the front horizontally, folded behind the narrow end again, brought over the top of the knot from behind, tucked behind the horizontal pass, and the knot pulled snug. The knot is slid up the narrow end of the tie until snug against the collar.

Using the notation of The 85 Ways to Tie a Tie, by Thomas Fink and Yong Mao, the four-in-hand knot (knot 2) is tied

- Li Ro Li Co T.

== Other uses ==
When it is used to attach rope to an object, the four-in-hand knot is known as the buntline hitch. It was used by sailors throughout the Age of Sail to rig ships and remains a useful working knot today.

== Onassis knot ==
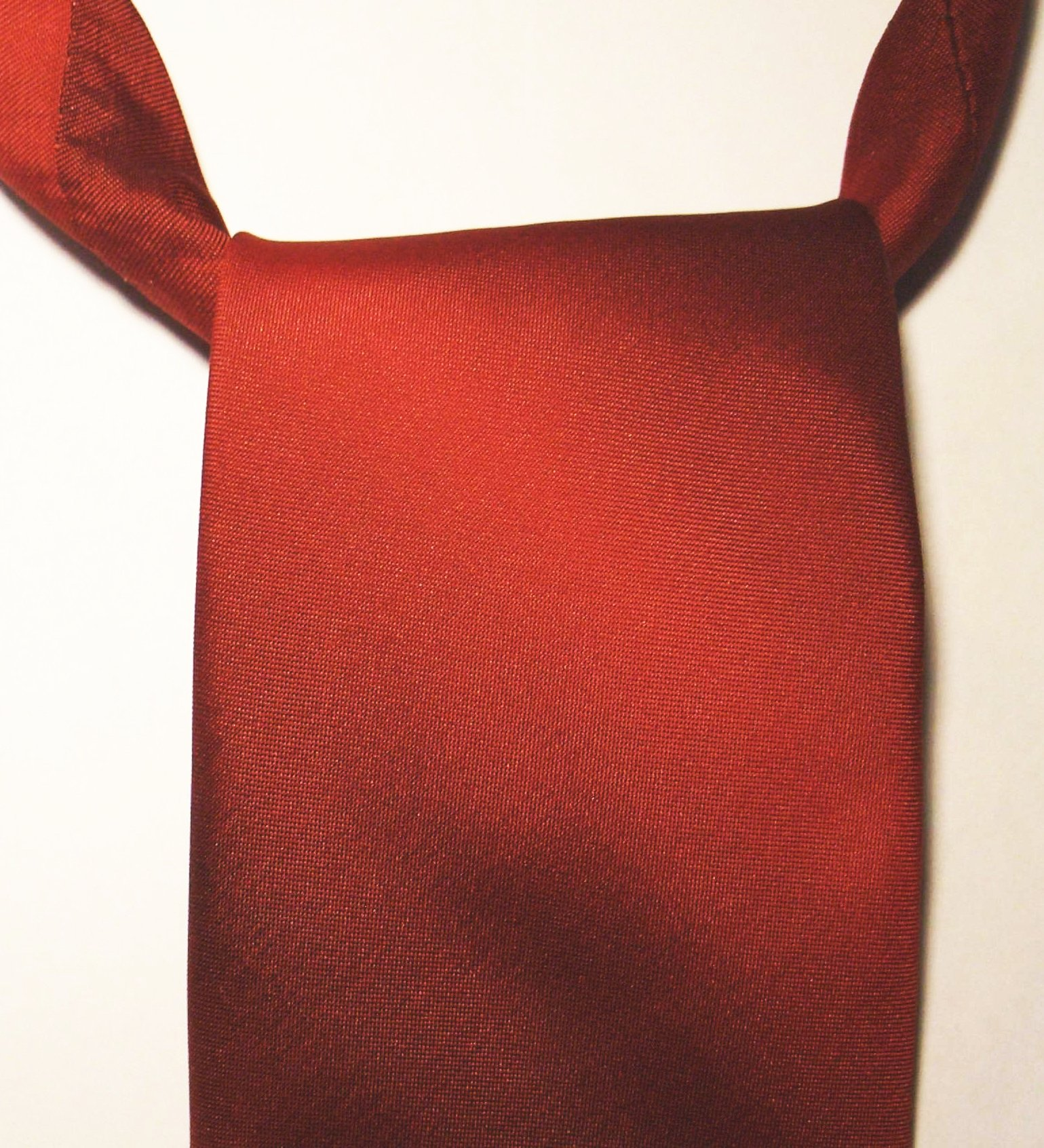
Onassis knot

A variant of the four-in-hand, with the long end of the tie passed back around and above the just-tied knot, was employed by Aristotle Onassis, who caused it to become briefly fashionable in some circles. Fink and Mao record this variant as Knot 2_{on}; in shorthand notation, it is written Li Ro Li Co T Ri Co.

== See also ==
- Small knot – a lesser known but somewhat simpler necktie knot
- Half-Windsor knot – a more symmetric and slightly broader knot
- Windsor knot – a more symmetric and substantially bulkier knot
- List of knots
