= Ben Delo =

British entrepreneur and programmer

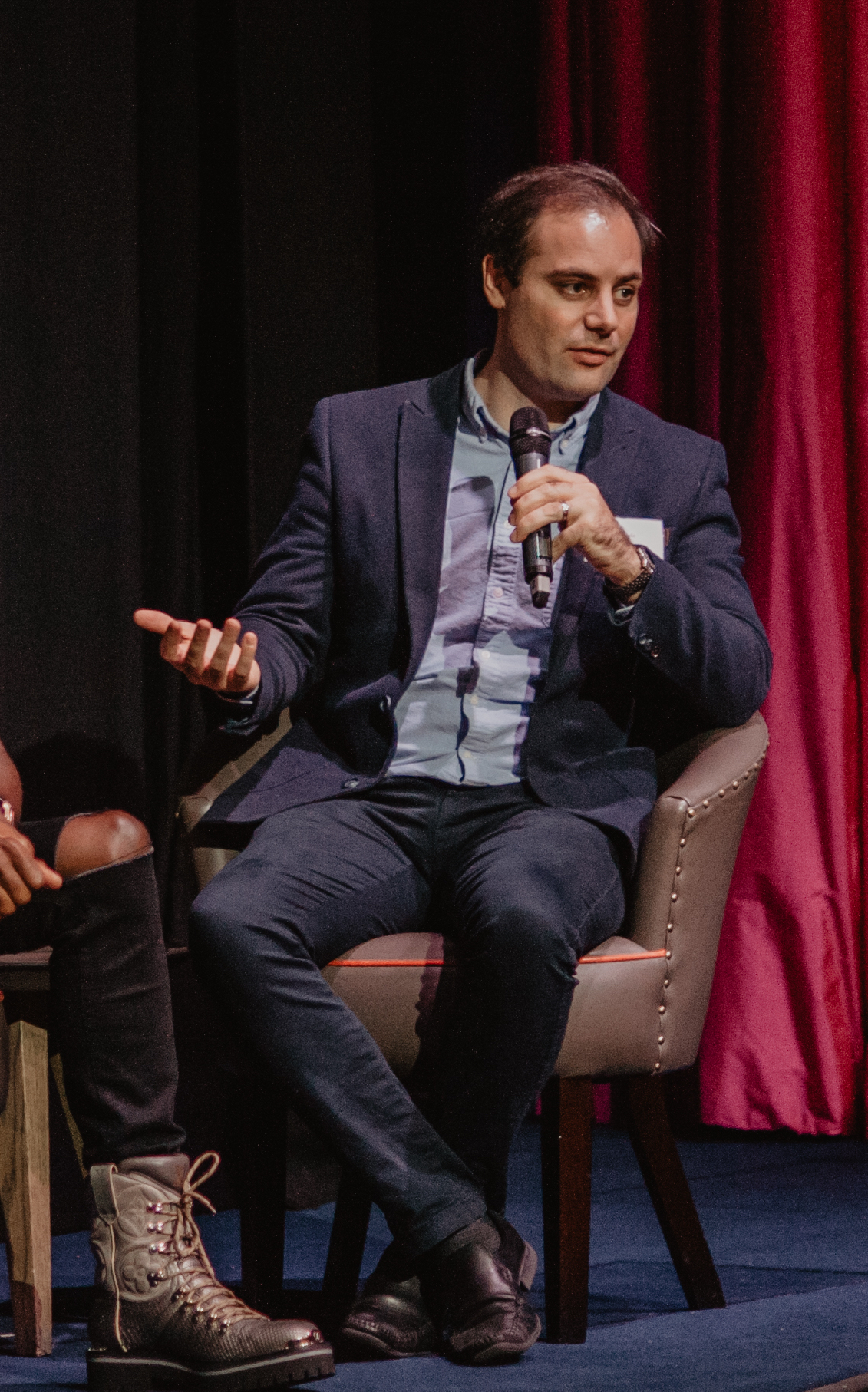
- Delo in 2018
- Born: Ben Peter Delo; 24 February 1984 (age 42); Sheffield, England, UK
- Education: Worcester College, Oxford (BA)
- Known for: Co-founding BitMEX Political donations to Reform UK

Ben Delo (/diːloʊ/, born 24 February 1984) is a British businessman and philanthropist. He is the co-founder and former executive of BitMEX.

In 2022, Delo pleaded guilty to a United States Bank Secrecy Act violation and received a 30-month probation sentence. In 2025, Delo was pardoned by President Donald Trump.

== Early life ==
Ben Peter Delo was born in Sheffield, England. According to Delo, he was diagnosed with Asperger's at age 11, at which point he already had an interest in coding and mathematics. He was educated at Lord Williams's School and graduated from the University of Oxford in 2005 with a double first-class honours degree in mathematics and computer science.

== Career ==
After a summer internship at IBM, Delo was hired by the company. Delo began his career as a software engineer at IBM, where he was named as an inventor on several patents granted by the United States Patent and Trademark Office and the Intellectual Property Office. He went on to develop high-frequency trading systems at hedge funds and banks such as GSA Capital and J.P. Morgan, dealing predominantly in kdb+/Q. After working with IBM, he moved to Hong Kong in 2012 to work for JP Morgan, at which point he developed an interest in buying Bitcoin.

In 2014, Delo met Arthur Hayes and Sam Reed, and they co-founded BitMEX, a cryptocurrency derivatives trading platform which became one of the largest in the world. Izabella Kaminska at Bloomberg has described Delo as "the BitMEX co-founder most responsible for the perpetual swap's invention". In 2018, The Times reported that Delo was the United Kingdom's youngest self-made billionaire. As noted in a 2020 IPSO complaint, The Times removed a reference that he had been included in the 2018 Sunday Times Rich List. Delo and his BitMEX co-founders stepped back from their executive positions in October 2020.

BitMEX shut down its operations on 23 September 2026.

== Bank Secrecy Act violation ==
On 1 October 2020, the Commodity Futures Trading Commission and the US Department of Justice charged BitMEX and its co-founders, including Delo, with various violations of American law. Delo and three others were charged with violating the Bank Secrecy Act by failing to implement an adequate anti-money laundering program. The regulators alleged that the BitMEX trading platform was required to have registered aspects of its operations in the US and had failed to do so.

In March 2021, Delo travelled to the United States and surrendered himself to authorities in New York. He pleaded not guilty to the charges and was bailed on a $20 million bond before being allowed to return to the United Kingdom. On 24 February 2022, the Attorney for the Southern District of New York announced that Delo and his BitMEX cofounder had each pleaded guilty to one Bank Secrecy Act violation for "willfully failing to establish, implement, and maintain an anti-money laundering ('AML') program at BitMEX". Under the terms of their plea agreements, Delo and his co-founders each agreed to pay a $10 million civil monetary penalty to the CFTC. On 15 June 2022, Delo was sentenced to 30 months' probation, through 15 December 2024. On 29 March 2025, Delo and the other two BitMEX founders were pardoned by President Donald Trump.

== Philanthropy ==
In 2018, Delo donated £5 million to Worcester College, Oxford, endowing fellowships in mathematics and computer science. In 2019, he signed the Giving Pledge, pledging to give away the majority of his wealth during his lifetime. In 2020, he co-founded the Sheila Coates Foundation, which supports students with autism in Britain. In 2025, he funded the Ben Delo Fellowship at the London Institute for Mathematical Sciences. In 2026, he gave £25 million to his autism charity the Sheila Coates Foundation, and pledged an additional £20 million to the London Institute for Mathematical Sciences.

== Political donations ==
In early 2026, Delo gave £4 million to Reform UK, and in April 2026 announced he was moving back to the UK after the Labour government changed the law to put a £100,000 cap on political donations from Britons living abroad, writing in The Telegraph that England was his home and that "the biggest obstacle to national recovery is the entrenched self-deception of our elites". He gave a further £4 million to Reform UK in early September 2026. Later the same month, he donated a further £36 million to Reform UK, which became the largest donation to a political party in British history at that point; he said that the purpose of the donation was to "level [the] playing field" against the Conservatives and Labour. Delo stated that he was giving Reform UK £1 million per month between now and the expected 2029 general election, but was giving it all up front to prevent any attempt by the Labour government to block it.

== See also ==
- List of people granted executive clemency in the second Trump presidency
