= Arthur Hayes =

Arthur Hayes may refer to:

- Arthur Hayes (cricketer) (1923–1999), South African cricketer
- Arthur Hayes (banker), American banker and entrepreneur
- Arthur H. Hayes Jr. (1933–2010), American pharmacologist, medical educator and government agency head

== See also ==
- Arthur Hays (disambiguation)
