= Michael Moran (journalist) =

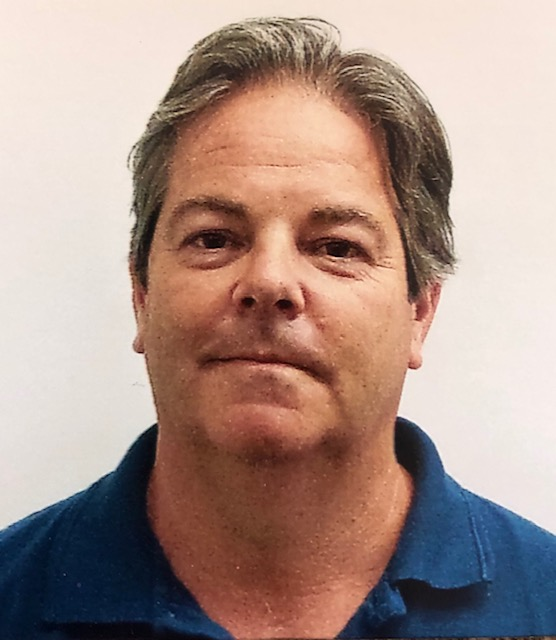
Michael Moran

Michael E. Moran (born May 1962 in Kearny, New Jersey) is an American author and analyst of international affairs and digital transformation who currently serves as a senior executive at the technology firm Microshare.

== Career ==
Moran spent the bulk of his early career as a foreign policy journalist, then as a partner and chief macro-strategist at the global consultancy Control Risks. He served as editor-in-chief at the investment bank Renaissance Capital and has been a commentator for Slate, the BBC, and NBC News. He lectures on political risk as an adjunct at the University of Denver.He conceived of and served as executive producer of the Crisis Guides documentary series for the Council on Foreign Relations.

== Biography ==
Moran has worked as senior correspondent, MSNBC.com (2003–05); senior producer, International News and Special Reports, MSNBC.com (1996–2003); U.S. affairs analyst, BBC World Service (1993–96); senior editor, Radio Free Europe (1990–93), former reporter for Associated Press, St. Petersburg Times, Sarasota Herald-Tribune (1985–88). His work has appeared in The New York Times, The Washington Post, Newsweek, The Economist, The Spectator (UK), The Guardian, The New Leader, and he has spoken on National Public Radio. He has lectured at universities and think tanks. From 2005 to June 2009, he served as executive editor of CFR.org, the website of the Council on Foreign Relations. Moran was a foreign affairs columnist for GlobalPost.

Moran also served as a Hearst New Media Fellow at Columbia University Graduate School of Journalism and was a board member of the Overseas Press Club. He was an adjunct professor of journalism at Bard College (2004–16), a visiting fellow in Peace and Security at the Carnegie Corporation of New York (2015–18), and lectures on political risk at the University of Denver. From 2009 to May 2011, he served as vice president, executive editor, and senior geostrategy analyst at Roubini Global Economics, a consultancy founded by economist Nouriel Roubini. He is author of The Reckoning: Debt, Democracy and the Future of American Power, published in 2012 by Palgrave Macmillan. He is co-author of The Fastest Billion: The Story Behind Africa's Economic Revolution.

== Publications ==
As a columnist, Moran worked at MSNBC.com, Brave New World. In a column in December 1999, entitled "Times's Up for the Taliban," he cited the threat Osama bin Laden presented to major cities in the United States, and advocated a U.S.-led coalition of like-minded states invade and capture the al-Qaeda leader. He broke the 2004 story of inadequate armor on American Humvee patrol vehicles, a revelation which, combined with the quick, angry response of service parents, ultimately forced the Pentagon to spend tens of millions to "back-armor" the vehicles. Jack H. Jacobs, a retired U.S. Army colonel awarded the Congressional Medal of Honor during the Vietnam War, said of Moran's Humvee reporting that it was "an important story that helped save countless lives. All the more impressive because wartime makes it hard to bring this kind of stuff to light."

Moran's book, The Reckoning: Debt, Democracy and the Future of American Power, was published in 2012 by Palgrave Macmillan. In the book, Moran argues that US policymakers reacted incorrectly to the 2008 financial crisis, exacerbating US problems, but that demographics and cultural factors still make the US the economy to watch in the 21st century - a good thing for the many smaller countries who undervalue the role American influence and power plays in their own economic stability.

Starting in 2008, Moran led a team that received a series of Emmy awards for documentary work. In 2008, he served as Executive Producer of a team that won a News & Documentary Emmy award for Crisis Guide: Darfur, an interactive multimedia feature on the humanitarian crisis in Darfur region of Sudan. He repeated the following year (2009), winning the Emmy in the "New Approaches to Business and Financial Coverage" category for Crisis Guide: The Global Economy. In April 2011, Crisis Guide: Pakistan received an Overseas Press Club award. In 2012, Moran and his team won its third Emmy with Crisis Guide: Iran, the final in the series.
