= Lord Williams's School =

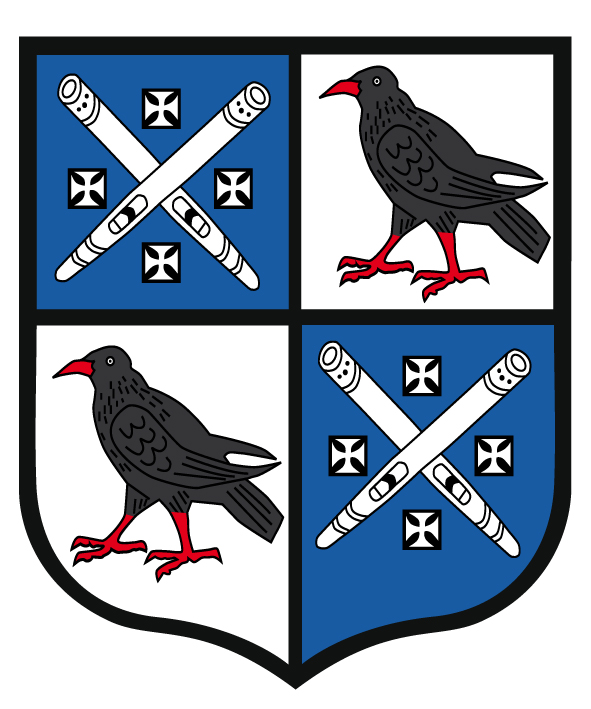

Location
- Thame, Oxfordshire; England
- 51.746666°N 0.991777°W

Information
- Type: Comprehensive Academy
- Motto: Sic itur ad astra a tous venaunts (thus the way to the stars for all comers)
- Established: 1575
- Founder: John Williams, 1st Baron Williams of Thame
- Local authority: Oxfordshire
- Department for Education URN: 138667 Tables
- Ofsted: Reports
- Chair: Mike Underwood
- Headteacher: Neil Dimbleby
- Gender: Co-educational
- Age: 11 to 18
- Enrolment: 2,200 approx.
- Colours: Blue; Maroon
- Website: http://www.lordwilliams.oxon.sch.uk/

Lord Williams's School is a co-educational comprehensive secondary school with academy status in Thame, Oxfordshire, England. The school educates pupils from the age of 11 through to the age of 18. The school has approximately 2,200 students.

In September 2001 the Department for Education and Skills (DfES) designated the school as a specialist Sports College.

Neil Dimbleby has been headteacher of the school since September 2024 after taking over from Jon Ryder.

== History ==
The school opened in 1570, having been founded at the bequest of John Williams, 1st Baron Williams of Thame, after his death in 1559. A building with a single classroom, two rooms for the Master and Usher, and a dormitory for boarders was erected in 1569 close to St Mary's Church and adjacent to the almshouses (all can still be seen today). In 1575, the Statutes were published which not only laid out how the school should be run but established the connection with New College, Oxford that lasts to this day.

It was an Endowed grammar school supported by income from John Williams's bequests (an endowment) and fees paid by scholars. The first headmaster was Edward Harris, born in 1534 and a native of Thame. A note on one copy of the Statutes states: "On the Day before the feast of St Andrews [November 29] 1570, Edward Harris who had previously been elected master, took up his office of teaching in the newly completed school."

Across the seventeenth and eighteenth century, it had a history of educating scholars who went on to have significant national influence (as listed below). However, by the middle of the 19th century, its fortunes had declined and, in 1872, it was decided to temporarily close the school and make a fresh start on a site on the Oxford Road, Thame. The new buildings opened in 1879. Records show that by 1890 the school had 57 boarders and 7 day boys; over the next thirty years, the number of day boys increased and, by 1920, there were 61 boarders and 52 day boys on the roll.

From 1895, the school started to receive grants from the local educational authority to supplement its income and the school began to lose its independence. In the 1930s almost all the school's income was coming from the local authority. By the mid 1940s it became clear that the school could no longer remain independent. In 1947 it became a state school under the direction of the Oxfordshire Education Committee.

The roll increased rapidly and reached bursting point in 1960 when it stood at 200 and the school had to turn away pupils. The Education Committee announced that it would institute a building programme and double the school's size. The Committee also accepted the Governor’s recommendation that to preserve the essential characteristic of the school, the size of the Boarding House be increased to 90. In late 1963, these new buildings were opened and the roll increased again.

In 1966, the Education Committee privately announced that it was planning to turn Lord Williams's Grammar School into a single-sex comprehensive to be called Lord Williams's School and that a separate girls' comprehensive school would be built alongside the existing buildings.

However these plans were amended and in 1971 it became a co-educational comprehensive school when it merged with the Wenman School. The site of which became one part of the lower school, known as Lower School East, while Lower School West was established on the Oxford Road site alongside what was known as the Upper School. In 1995 Lower School West merged into another part of Upper School and Lower School East became the one site for years 7-9.

Currently, the school is still dual-site and the long awaited plans to have a single site on the Oxford Road have yet to be reached.

=== Boarding ===
Boys boarded at the school for over 400 years. When the new school opened in 1879 they boarded at Main House on the site of the current school. As their numbers increased in the 1960s, the older boys also used two residential houses close to the school – Greenacres and Highfield. In 1992, the boarding facility was closed and since then the school has admitted day students only.

=== Masters ===
- 1575: Edward Harris
- 1597: Richard Bouchier
- 1627: Hugo Evans
- 1647: William Ailiff
- 1655: Hugo Willis
- 1675: Thomas Middleton
- 1694: Henry Bruces
- 1727: William Lamplugh
- 1727: James Fussel
- 1729: Robert Wheeler
- 1729: John Kipling
- 1773: William Cooke
- 1786: William Stratford
- 1814: Timothy Tripp Lee
- 1841: Thomas B Fookes
- 1879: George Plummer

=== Headmasters ===
- 1891: Benjamin Sharp
- 1899: Alfred Shaw
- 1920: Walter Bye
- 1929: Arthur Dyer
- 1948: Hugh Mullens
- 1957: Jon Nelson
- 1965: Geoffrey Goodall
- 1979: Peter Wells
- 1985: David Kenningham

=== Headteachers ===
- 1997: Pat O'Shea
- 2000: Michael Spencer
- 2005: David Wybron
- 2019: Jon Ryder
- 2024: Neil Dimbleby

== Drama Studio Fire ==
On 30 June 2007 a fire broke out at the drama studio of the Lower School campus of Lord Williams School. The emergency services received a 999 call at 9.42pm although it is currently believed the fire had started at 8.30pm.

65 fire fighters from across the county were able to control the blaze and stop it from destroying a neighbouring building with fire fighters from Thame, Wheatley, Watlington and Slade Park, as well as teams from Buckinghamshire Fire & Rescue coming from Aylesbury, Brill, Princes Risborough and Waddesdon attending the blaze.

=== Causes ===
Originally it was believed that arson was the cause but an electrical fire was not ruled out. However, in February 2008, a 23-year-old man called Craig Ford was found guilty of arson and sentenced to five years in prison.

=== The Phoenix Project ===
In early 2008, a project began to raise up to £1m in order to replace the drama studio with a new drama and dance studio, including a box office and permanent seating for the Thame Youth Theatre.

== Notable former pupils ==
- John Balance, musician
- William Basse, poet
- Simon Burnett, swimmer
- Avril (April) Spary, TV Producer, BAFTA Winner for Murder in Successville
- Johnny Claes, musician and F1 racing driver
- Bertie Corbett, England Football International
- Rob Deering, comedian, guitarist and writer
- Ben Delo, computer scientist, philanthropist and co-founder of BitMEX
- Thomas Ellwood, religious writer
- George Etherege, dramatist
- John Fell, clergyman
- Sir Timothy Fraser, Royal Navy officer
- Gavin Free, actor, director, Internet personality
- Simon Gillett, professional footballer
- Jane Tewson, social activist, co-founder of Comic Relief
- Howard Goodall, musician and television presenter. Wrote the Blackadder theme tune
- Arthur Goodwin, politician
- Daniel Gruchy, Internet personality
- John Hampden, politician
- Sir John Holt Lord Chief Justice
- Richard Ingoldsby soldier and regicide
- Henry King, poet and Bishop of Chichester
- William Lenthall, politician
- Andrew Logan sculptor and founder of Alternative Miss World
- Shackerley Marmion, dramatist
- John Maxton, Lord Maxton, Labour MP for Glasgow Cathcart, 1979 - 2001.
- Simon Mayne, regicide
- Edward Pococke, Orientalist and biblical scholar
- Derek Teden England Rugby International
- John Voce, actor
- Paul Volley, rugby player
- Edmund Waller poet and politician
- Daniel Whistler physician and FRS
- Anthony Wood, antiquary
- John Woodvine, actor
