= Medal inflation =

Increased number of military awards

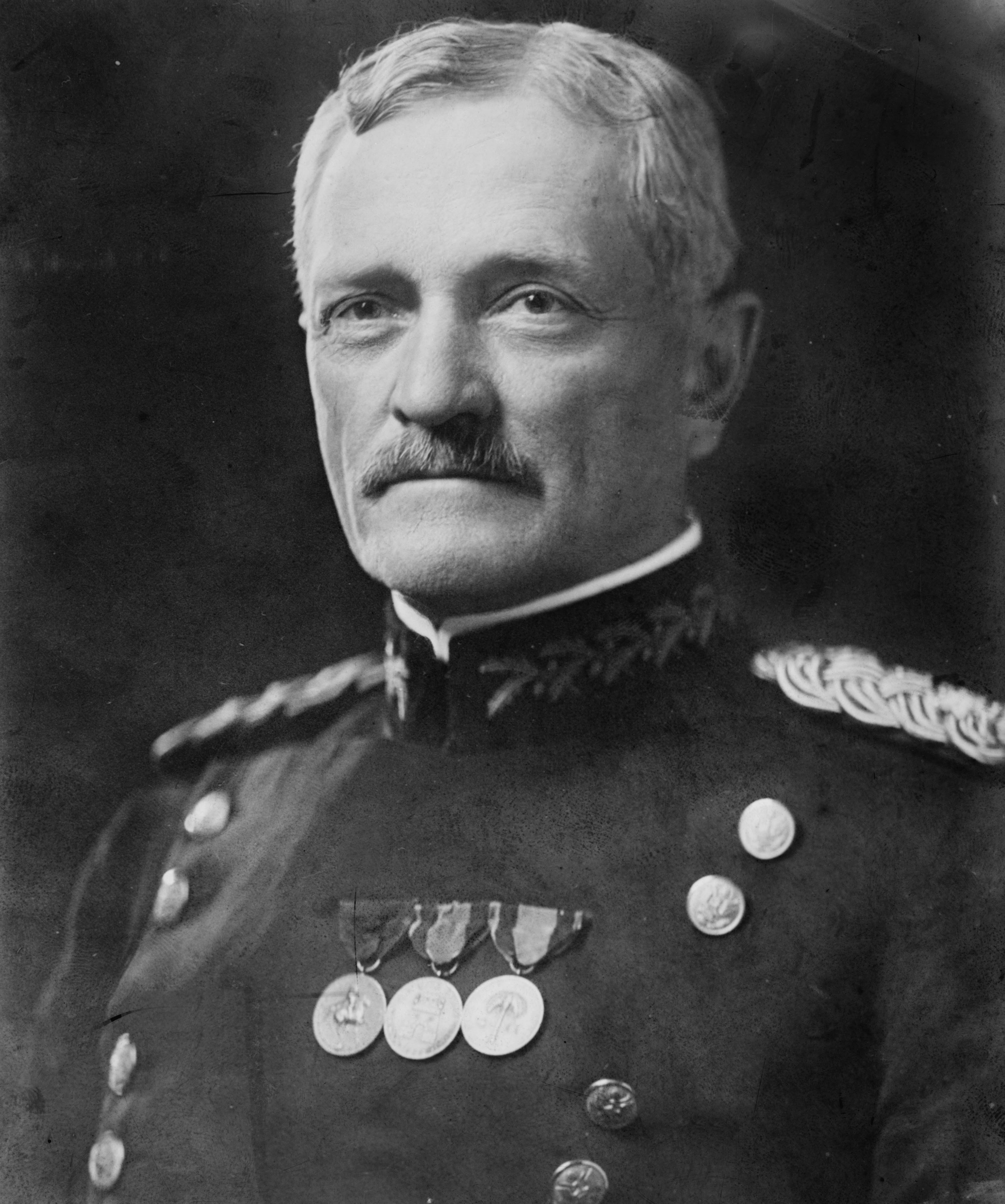
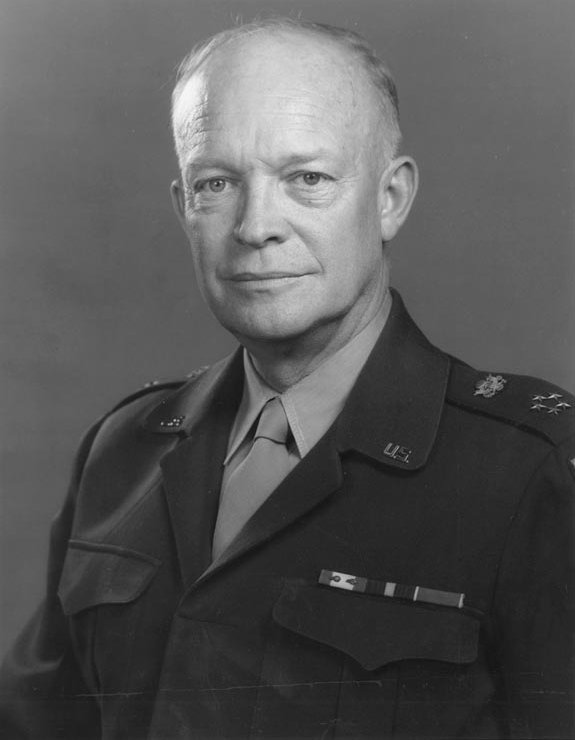
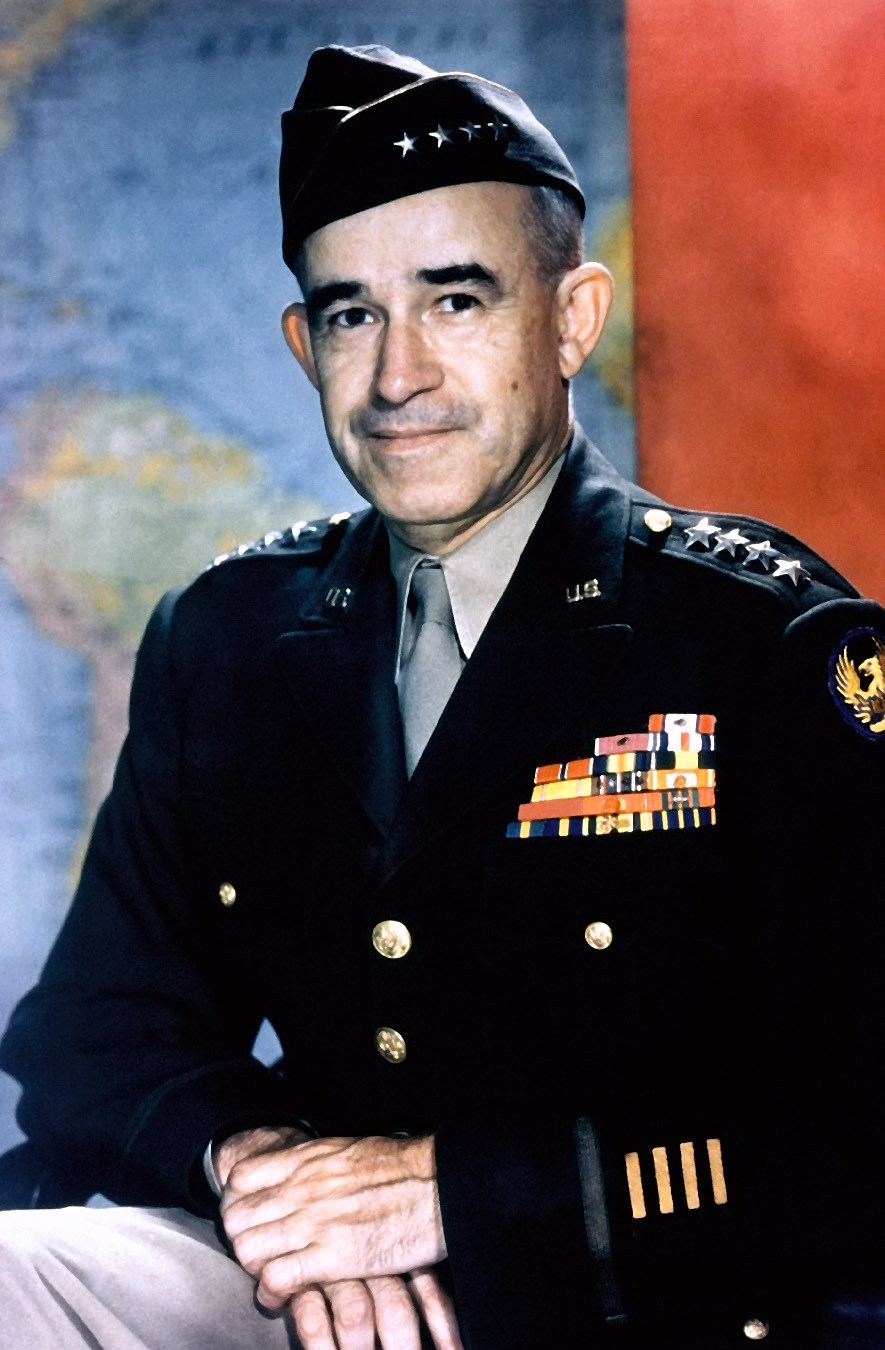
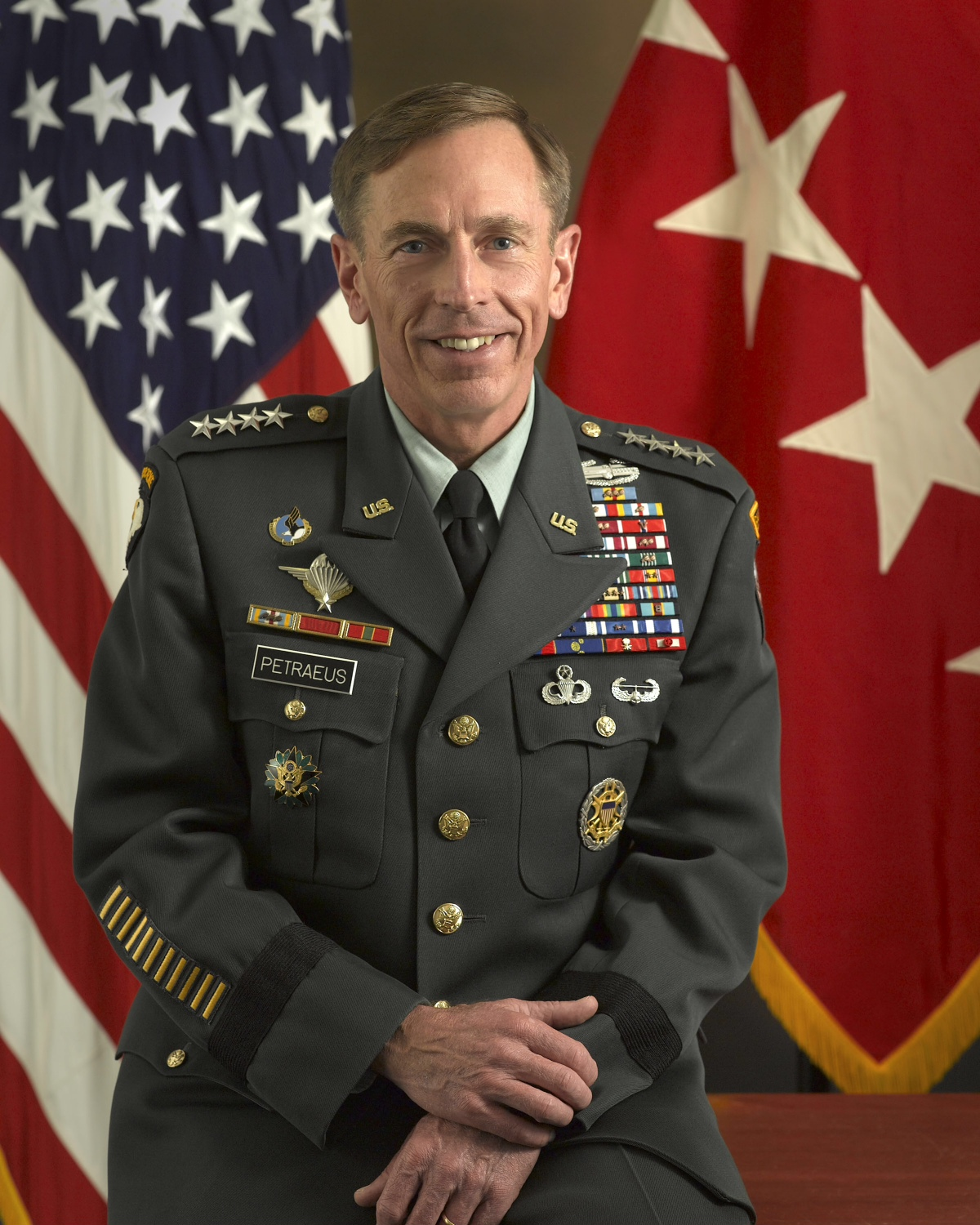
Some media reports have highlighted differences in the number of medals awarded to WWI General John J. Pershing, WWII Generals Dwight D. Eisenhower and Omar Bradley and war on terror General David Petraeus.

Medal inflation is a term used by the media, particularly in the United States, to describe the increase in the number of medals awarded to the armed forces in recent times and a perceived devaluing of medals because of this. It has been discussed since at least 1979 when a book was published relating to the Vietnam War. The war on terror and particularly the 2003 invasion of Iraq saw a resurgence in coverage, as there was a rapid increase in the number of medals awarded by US forces. There was, however, a significant reduction in the volume of medals as the war entered the counter-insurgency phase.

== United States ==
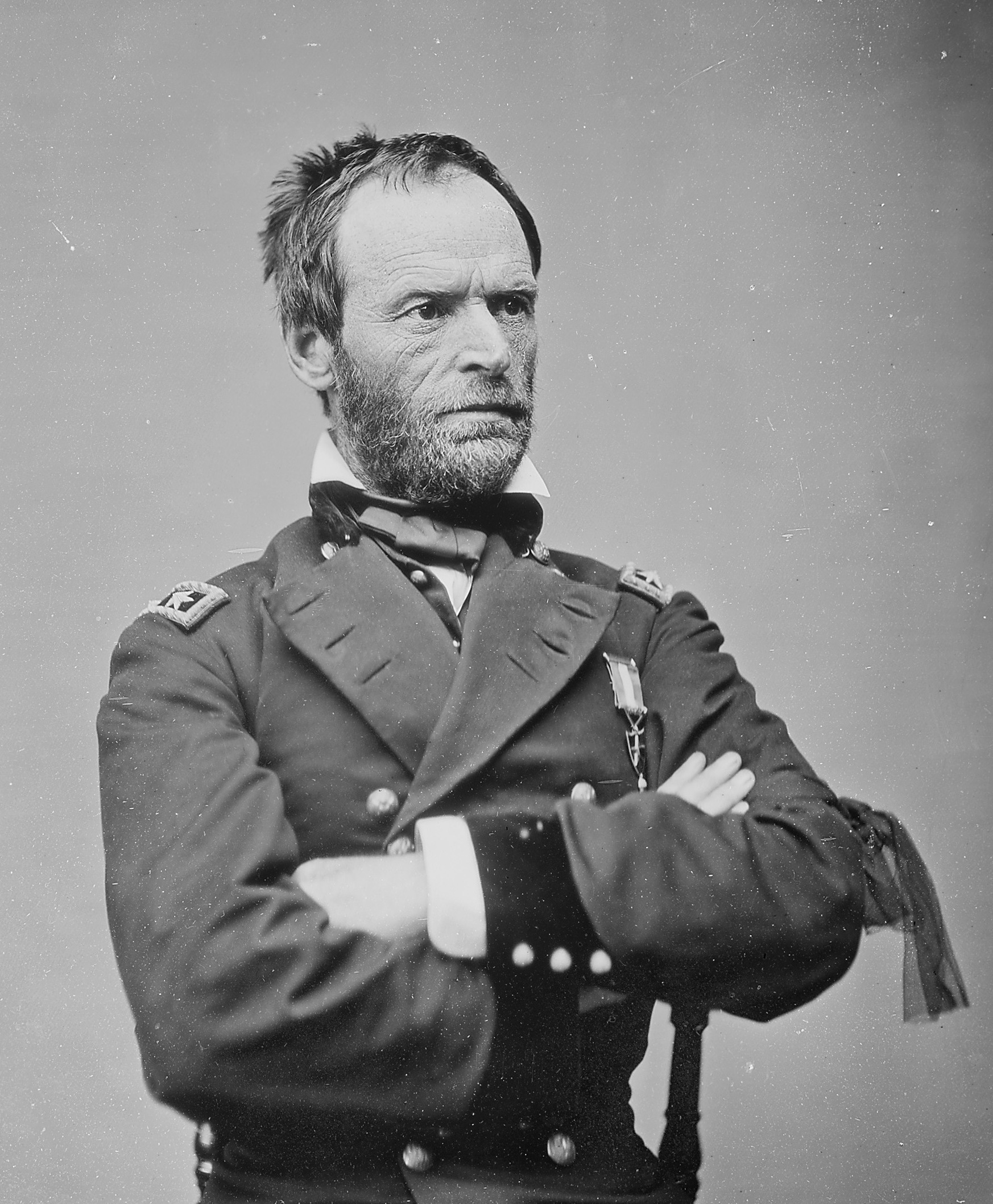
General William T. Sherman in 1865 wearing a single medal

Various parts of the American media have discussed the perceived problem of medal inflation; most frequently since the start of the war on terror in 2001 including articles in the Huffington Post (Dorian De Wind), Newsweek (Evan Thomas) and NBC News (Michael Moran). It has also been discussed in a 2006 book by Paul Robinson and a 2016 work by Michael P. Kreuzer. Earlier treatments of the subject include a 1979 book (Crisis in Command) discussing the situation in the Vietnam War and a 1996 article in The New York Times. The question discussed frequently is whether the medals are deserved or being awarded at too high a rate, leading to "devaluation" of the award.

Historically the US Armed Forces have relied heavily upon individual commanding officers to apply for and approve medals, leading to significant variability in the criteria required for each award. One critic, Colonel Jack Jacobs, who received the Medal of Honor in Vietnam said, in 2004: "It's an age old problem with the Army and Air Force, too. The authority to approve awards is at a very low level, and that has a tendency to increase their frequency. Plus, there's always a political motive, or component, to giving out awards, to keep morale high and create a positive story for the home front". A counterpoint is that in the modern US military a serviceman's medals serve as his "resumé" indicating his career achievements, rather than serving to show only the most valorous or meritorious service.

=== Early history ===
The United States Army, perhaps conscious of the founding fathers' democratic principles, was sparing with its medals. Some distinguished generals including Civil War leaders Ulysses S. Grant and William Tecumseh Sherman wore few if any medals on their uniform. Indeed, the US Army had no medal to recognise valor on the battlefield until the Civil War when the Medal of Honor was first introduced. The Medal of Honor was the only such medal until US involvement in the First World War when a number of other medals were introduced. Controversy over the number of medals issued dates back to at least the Second World War. During the early US involvement in North Africa, two US generals visited the front and issued 60 Legion of Merit medals. These medals criteria should have limited them only to very senior officers and the majority of the 60 issued were outside of the criteria. US President Franklin D. Roosevelt disapproved of this action but did not veto the awards. The Second World War as a whole saw a significant increase in the number of medals issued to individual servicemen.

=== Later 20th century ===
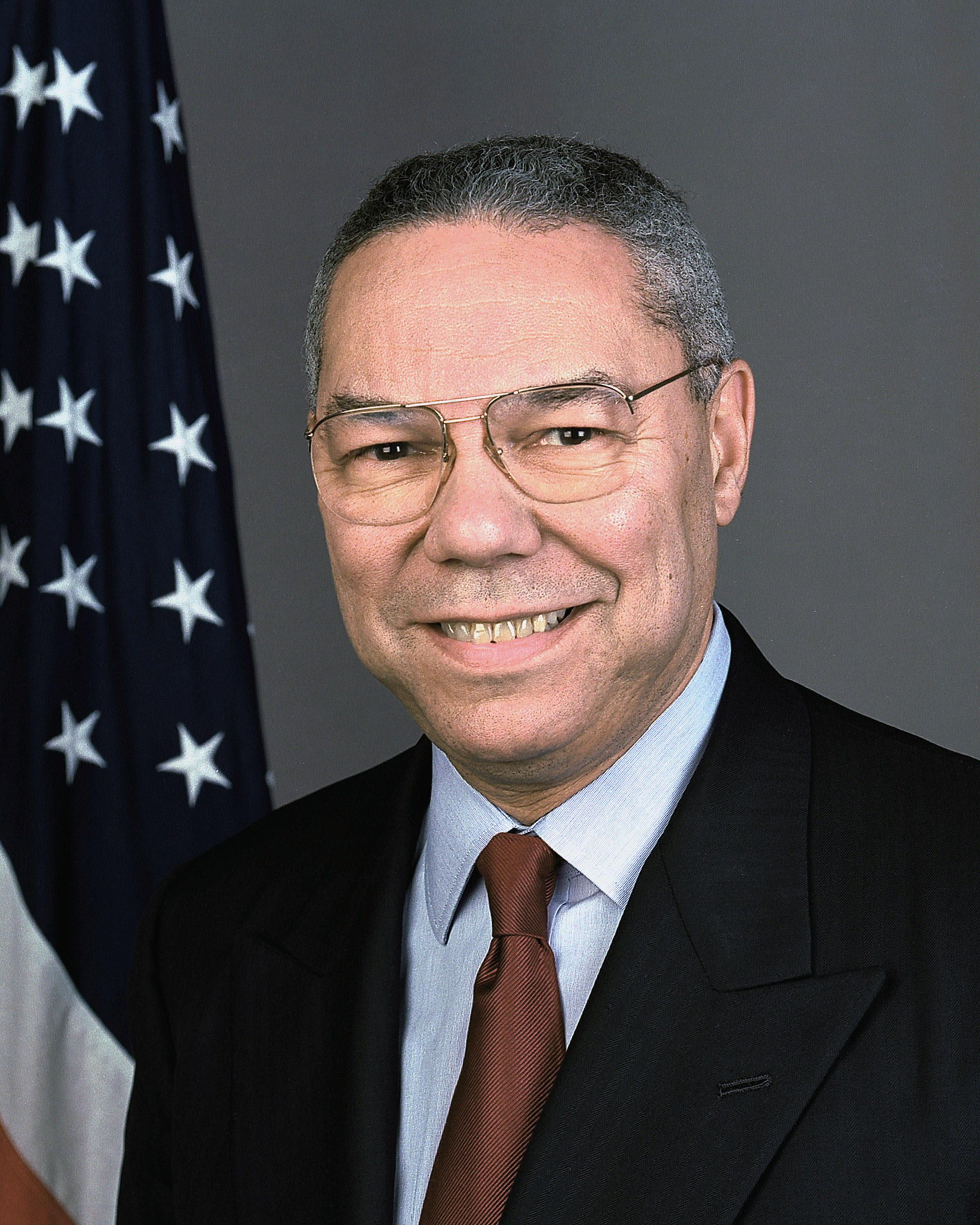
Retired General Colin Powell stated that his award of the Legion of Merit was devalued by medal inflation during the Vietnam War.

A large number of service awards (for "time served") were introduced following the Second World War, which increased the number of medals servicemen could expect to receive. The Vietnam War brought about the use of military bravery medals as a means of raising force morale. Historians Richard A. Gabriel and Paul L. Savage state that "medal packages" were common in which an officer received a set of medals merely for holding a certain rank or appointment; leading to a reduction in the perceived value of these medals. Later, US General Colin Powell described the practice saying that:

the Legion of Merit I received? It might have meant more to me in a war where medals were not awarded so indiscriminately. I remember once, as division G-3, attending a battalion change-of-command ceremony at one firebase where the departing CO was awarded three Silver Stars, the nation's third highest award for valor, plus a clutch of other medals, after a tour lasting six months. He had performed ably, at times heroically. He was popular with his men. Yet, his troops had to stand there and listen to an overheated description of a fairly typical performance ... The departing battalion commander's 'package', a Silver Star, a Legion of Merit and Air Medals just for logging helicopter time, became almost standard issue.

Tim O'Brien, who processed awards in Vietnam for his unit, said of the time: "we dispensed awards – Purple Hearts, one and the same for a dead man or a man with a scraped fingernail; Bronze Stars for valor, mostly for officers who knew how to lobby".

One award singled out as an example of medal inflation is the Army Service Ribbon, awarded for completing basic initial training, introduced by the US Army in peacetime in 1981. The US invasion of Grenada in 1983 has also been cited as an example: some 8,600 campaign medals were awarded despite only 7,200 troops actually serving in the country. The New York Times also notes the awarding of combat medals to seamen of the USS Vincennes who shot down a civilian airliner, Iran Air Flight 655, in 1988 and the issue of a Purple Heart medal to a paratrooper who suffered a heat stroke during the 1989 US invasion of Panama were controversial. The Gulf War of 1990–91 saw almost 3.5 million US service members awarded the National Defense Service Medal, though the majority remained in the United States during this time.

A study in 1994 showed that there was some disparity between the services with regards the frequency of awards. The US Air Force issued 287 decorations per 1,000 service members in that year, the US Navy 148, and the US Marine Corps just 70. At the time there was pressure on the Marine Corps to increase the number of medals issued to "catch up" to the other services.

=== War on terror ===
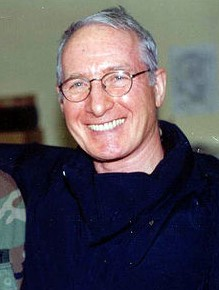
Retired Colonel David Hackworth was critical of medal inflation he perceived during the war on terror.

During the 2003 invasion of Iraq complaints were made in some parts of the media that the number of medals awarded was out of proportion with the danger experienced by the troops and that bravery awards were more likely to be issued to officers than enlisted personnel. Of the 26 Silver Stars awarded for the 2003 capture of Baghdad 4 were awarded to colonels, 11 to captains and just 11 to NCOs, none went to privates; of the 104 Bronze Stars with valor device, 32 were awarded to officers and 72 to other ranks (only 4 of whom were privates) and of the 274 plain Bronze Stars 149 went to officers, 133 to NCOs and just 3 to privates. The Purple Heart, which is awarded automatically for being wounded and so perhaps is more reflective of the danger individual soldiers experience was awarded 88 times, only 10 times to officers, 36 to NCOs and 42 to privates.

The US Air Force was subject to criticism regarding the number of medals awarded during the invasion: some 69,000 medals were handed out, significantly more than the army (who awarded 40,000) despite the fact that army personnel were, in general, posted to more dangerous locations. The ratio of Bronze Stars awarded per fatality in the US Air Force was 91:1 and in the Army 27:1. The US Marine Corps took active steps to limit the number of medals awarded during the invasion and was praised by some at the time for having "kept the inflation in check"; it awarded just three Bronze Stars per fatality suffered. Some critics noted that the Air Force awards, on average, twice the number of medals per service member that the US Navy does.

A noted critic of medal inflation, Colonel David Hackworth was particularly critical of the Air Force for awarding the Distinguished Flying Cross to a pilot for a mission which missed its target in Baghdad and killed 16 civilians. He compared this to what would have been needed to receive the medal in the Second World War: "In World War II, when I saw a Distinguished Flying Cross, that meant the guy had made 25 or 30 missions over dangerous places like Hamburg or Berlin. Those places sometimes had 50 percent casualty rates. Now, they give medals out to guys who fly bombers invisible to radar whose bombs miss Saddam and kill civilians in a restaurant. It's an outrage". There were in fact a relatively large number of Distinguished Flying Crosses awarded for the invasion: between its establishment in 1927 and 2002 only 3,300 of the medals had been awarded but between March 2002 and February 2004 463 were approved.

Once the war settled down into the counter-insurgency phase the number of medals awarded decreased significantly. Up until 2009 the rate of Medals of Honor awarded was just 0.1 per 100,000 service members, significantly under the ratio in the Korean War (2.3) and the Second World War (2.9). The reasons cited for this were that the technological development of warfare had reduced the number of face-to-face engagements with the enemy; that the shift by the insurgents towards improvised explosive devices, mortars and sniper attacks away from standard infantry tactics had also reduced the number of traditional engagements and that the awards system had been made more rigorous.

== Other countries ==
The term has also been used in discussions on the awarding of medals to the British armed forces. Prior to the wars in Afghanistan and Iraq, the British Army had a reputation for rarely awarding gallantry medals, outside of special forces units. The Daily Telegraph noted in 2009 that there had been a significant rise in the number awarded since 2003. However, the process relies heavily upon the wording of the commanding officer's medal citation which can lead to variability. As an example the 1st Battalion of the Princess of Wales's Royal Regiment was awarded 37 medals (including one Victoria Cross, the nation's highest award for gallantry) for a single tour, but similar units engaged in similar tours in 2003 and 2006 received only a single mention in dispatches.

In the Canadian Armed Forces, there has been some discontent over the awarding of campaign medals, particularly as there was no means of differentiating between those who served regularly on patrol and those that never left the relative safety of the base. Anne Irwin, a military anthropologist at the University of Calgary's Centre for Strategic and Military Studies, proposed two new awards: a rosette on the campaign medal for those who had been off-base and a combat badge for those who fought. This would be similar to the US Army's practice of awarding the Combat Infantryman Badge, the Combat Medical Badge, and the Combat Action Badge (the latter introduced to solve a similar problem in 2005).

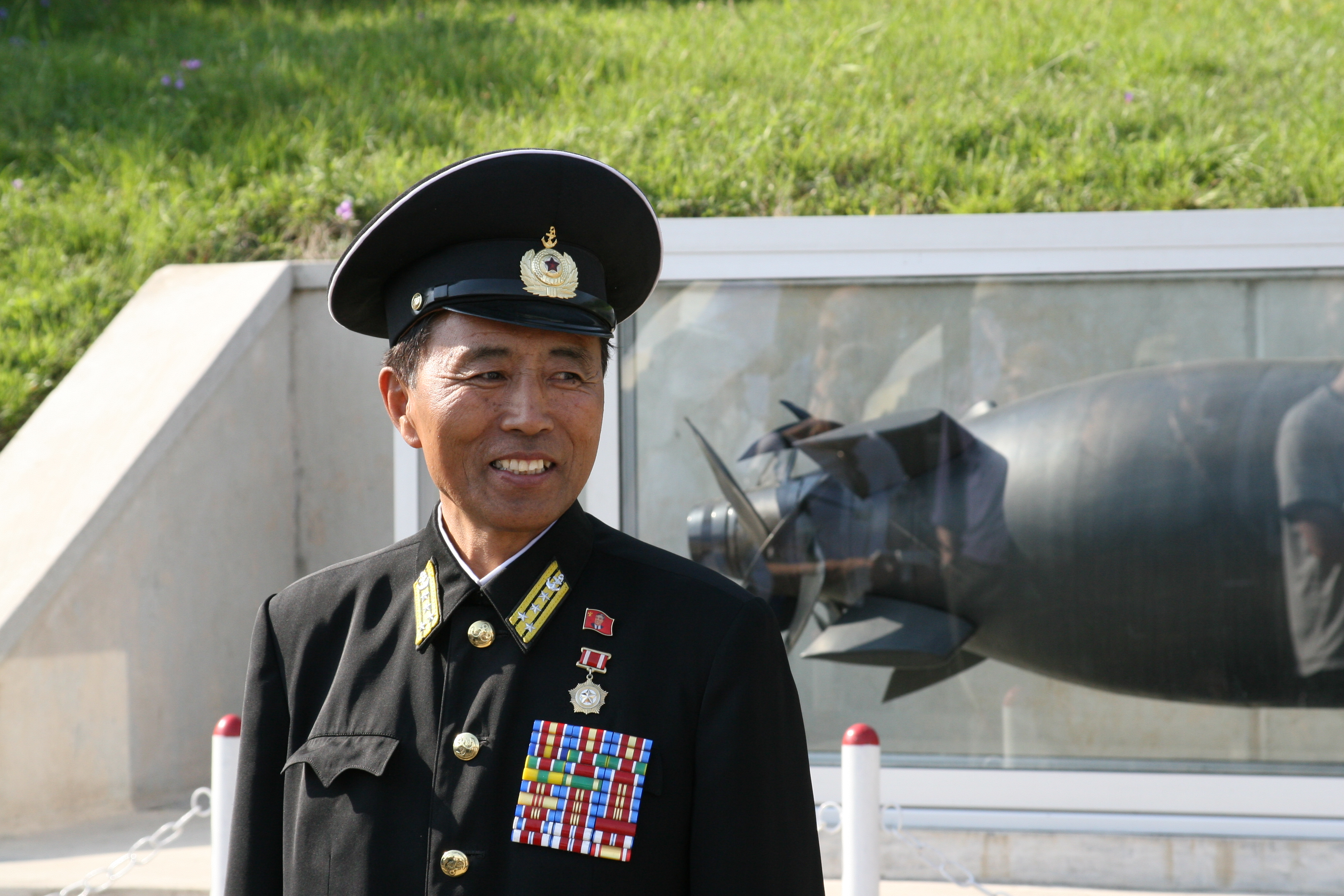
A North Korean naval daechwa (senior captain) wearing thirty ribbon bars, the Hero of the Republic medal and a Kim Il Sung badge.

Officers of the Korean People's Army are known for wearing large numbers of orders, decorations, and medals on public occasions, even though North Korea has not fought on a major scale since the 1953 truce that ended the Korean War.

== See also ==
- Grade inflation
