= Arthur Hays =

Arthur Hays may refer to:

- Arthur Garfield Hays (1881–1954), American lawyer and champion of civil liberties issues
- Arthur Bell Hays (1882–1944), American football, basketball, and baseball coach

== See also ==
- Arthur Hayes (disambiguation)
