= London Institute (disambiguation) =

The London Institute is a previous name of the University of the Arts London, England.

London Institute may also refer to:

- The London Institute of Banking & Finance, a training and professional body for financial services in England and Wales
- London Institute for Mathematical Sciences, a private academic research centre in London, England
- London Institute of 'Pataphysics
- City and Guilds of London Institute, a vocational education organisation in the UK

== See also ==
- London Institution
- Institute of Education University of London, the education school of University College London, England
- Lyndon Institute
