= Derivative Dribble =

Derivative Dribble is a blog written by Charles Davi focused on finance, particularly derivatives and structured products. The site explains how various financial instruments work and why they are used. Additionally, the site has opinion pieces on how derivatives and structured products operate. The site is referenced in some finance blogs and was syndicated on the Atlantic Monthly's Business Channel and RGE Monitor.
