= Mandatory (company) =

American lifestyle website

- Former name: CraveOnline (2004–2018)
- Website type: Lifestyle, entertainment
- Available in: English
- Headquarters: {{{location_country}}}
- Owner: Evolve Media
- Website: www.mandatory.com
- Commercial: Yes
- Launched: October 2004

Mandatory (formerly CraveOnline Media) is a lifestyle website based in Los Angeles with sales offices in New York City, Chicago and San Francisco. The site is owned by media company Evolve Media, LLC. Mandatory focuses its contents into the male-lifestyle audience, but it has diversified into content for all. Mandatory owns nine websites and has partnered with more, producing various content for each site. As of February 2021, it is only available in English.

== History ==
CraveOnline.com was launched by the online media company AtomicOnline, the publishing division of Evolve Media, LLC, in late 2004. CraveOnline was cited in the 2009 book The Man's Book: The Essential Guide for the Modern Man by Thomas Fink as a top website for men. Regarding CraveOnline, AskMen.com said, "CraveOnline.com combines entertainment and other interests in one place. Great articles, nice pictures and other cool stuff that you won't want to miss."

In March 2013, CraveOnline launched its 3D advertising cube for smartphones and tablets. In May 2013, it launched its own production studio. In August 2015, CraveOnline was relaunched. Aside from music, the website also began focusing on culture and lifestyle. In March 2018, CraveOnline changed its name to Mandatory, after a popular section of the site of the same name, with a new tagline "Laugh. Learn. Do Some Good." That same year, the company went through layoffs.

== Owned or associated websites ==
- Film and TV: ComingSoon.net, SuperHeroHype.com, ShockTillYouDrop.com.
- Gaming: ActionTrip, GameRevolution, PlayStation LifeStyle.
- Sports: HockeysFuture.com, Sherdog, WrestleZone.
