= Nouriel Roubini =

Iranian-American economist (born 1958)

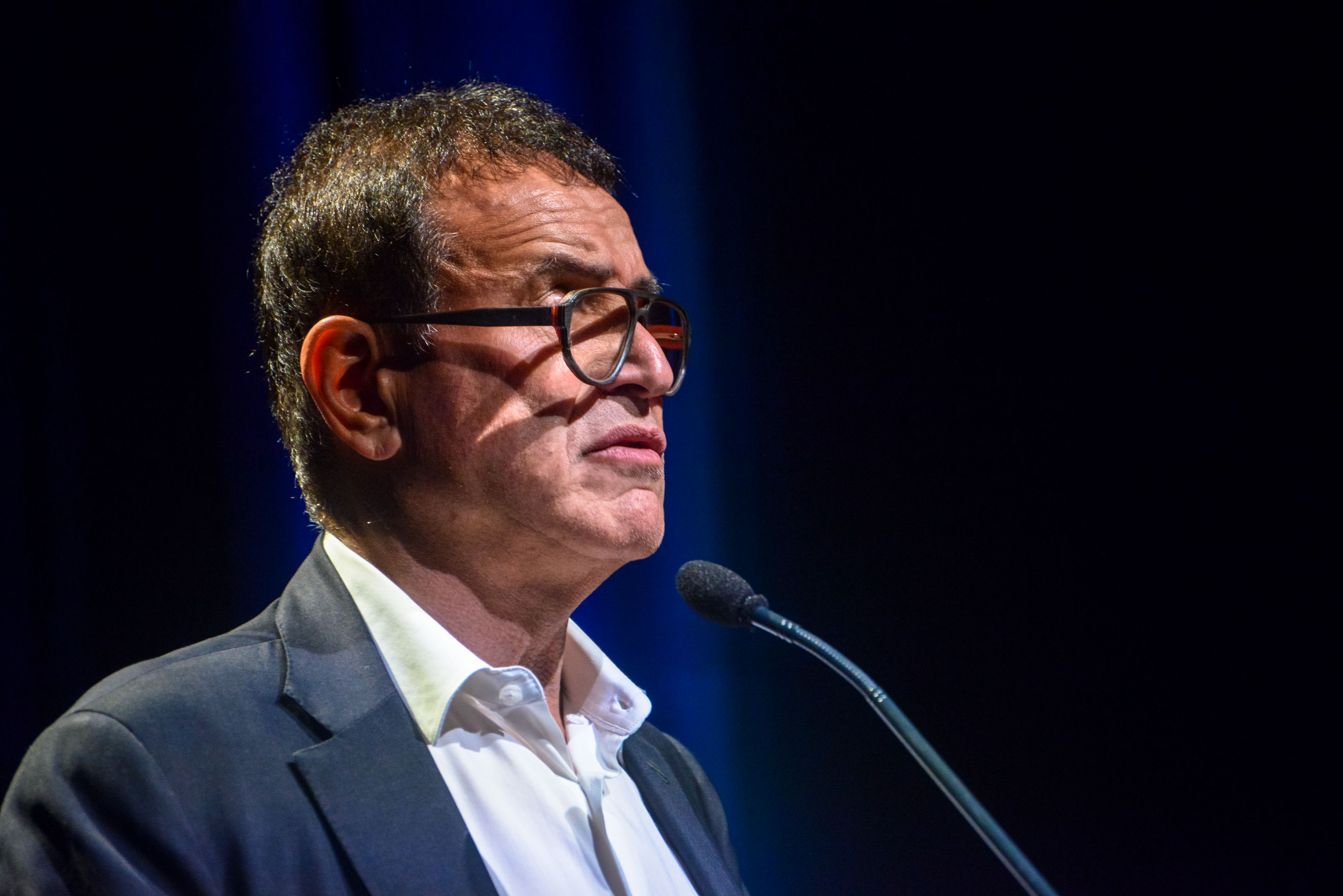
- Roubini in 2024
- Born: March 29, 1958 (age 68); Istanbul, Turkey

Academic background
- Education: Bocconi University (B.A.); Harvard University (Ph.D.)

Academic work
- Discipline: Economics
- Institutions: New York University
- Website: https://nourielroubini.com/; Information at IDEAS / RePEc

Nouriel Roubini (born March 29, 1958) is a Turkish-born American economic consultant, economist, speaker, and writer. He is a professor emeritus since 2021 at the Stern School of Business of New York University. Roubini earned a BA in political economics at Bocconi University in Italy and a doctorate in international economics at Harvard University. He was an academic at Yale University in the 1990s, and a researcher/advisor researching emerging markets.

During the Bill Clinton administration in 1998-99, Roubini was for one year a senior economist in the Council of Economic Advisers. He was one of the people who predicted the 2008 subprime mortgage crisis and he predicted the ensuing Great Recession, and warned that the COVID-19 recession could be even worse. Roubini is also a frequent critic of Bitcoin and other cryptocurrencies.

== Early life ==
Roubini was born on March 29, 1958, in Istanbul, Turkey, to Iranian Orthodox Jewish parents. When he was young, Roubini was expected to go into the rug business himself, and follow in his father's footsteps. When he was one year old, his family lived briefly in Tehran, Iran. When he was three years old, the family moved to Tel Aviv, Israel. From 1963 when he was five years old to 1983, he lived in Italy, primarily in Milan, where he attended the local Jewish school. He later attended the Hebrew University of Jerusalem in Israel where he completed a one-year program of undergraduate studies, in 1976–1977. He subsequently attended Bocconi University in Italy, earning a B.A. (1982) summa cum laude in economics, and in 2009 was named Bocconian of the Year. He received a PhD in international economics in 1988 from Harvard University, where his adviser was Jeffrey Sachs.

== Career ==
For much of the 1990s, Roubini taught at Yale and then in New York, while also working for stints at the International Monetary Fund (briefly as a summer intern and visiting scholar), and World Bank (briefly as a consultant). In 1998–99, he worked for one year in the Clinton administration as a senior economist in the Council of Economic Advisers. He worked from July to October 1999 at the U.S. Treasury Department as a senior adviser to Timothy Geithner (who was then the undersecretary for international affairs), and from October 1999 to June 2000 was director of its Office of Policy Development and Review.

Roubini returned to the IMF for July through August 2001 as a visiting scholar. He co-wrote Bailouts or Bail-ins?, a book on saving bankrupt economies, wrote MegaThreats: Ten Dangerous Trends That Imperil Our Future, And How to Survive Them, and started a series of economic firms. In 2021, he became a professor emeritus at the Stern School of Business at New York University.

=== Economic forecasts ===
Roubini says that his economic analysis approach is "holistic." Rather than focus on mathematical models and formulas, he draws his ideas from a combination of history, literature, and international politics, what he calls the "entire enchilada." He also described his approach at an IMF meeting, when discussing how he arrived at the percentage likelihood that there would be a recession, by saying: "If you ask me where I got that number: Just out of my nose. I will be very honest about that... my model is like a 'smell test'." Political economist Benjamin Kunkel described his approach as "almost shamanistic." Journalist Julia Ioffe observed "Roubini-ism-- [is] sprawling, non-linear, and hypercaffeinated-- ... his talking points are ... pluralized, rushing out quickly, like a magician's scarves ...."

== Predictions ==
Roubini's predictions earned him the nicknames "Dr. Doom" and "permabear" (economist slang for someone who continually projects downturns) in the media.

In 2004 he said that an upcoming recession would lead to the crash of the dollar; when a few years later a recession did come, it actually strengthened the dollar. In 2005 after Hurricane Katrina hit the US, Roubini predicted that an economic disaster was imminent; however, the next two years instead saw an increase in financial activity.

Roubini was one of the people, along with among others economists Dean Baker, Fred Harrison, Raghuram Rajan, Stephen Roach, and William White, analyst Meredith Whitney, investment advisers Gary Shilling, Peter Schiff, and Marc Faber, and CFTC chair Brooksley Born who predicted the crash of 2007–08.

However, financial journalist Justin Fox observed in the Harvard Business Review in 2010 that "In fact, Roubini didn't exactly predict the crisis that began in mid-2007... Roubini spent several years predicting a very different sort of crisis — one in which foreign central banks diversifying their holdings out of Treasuries sparked a run on the dollar — only to turn in late 2006 to warning of a U.S. housing bust and a global 'hard landing'. He still didn't give a perfectly clear or (in retrospect) accurate vision of how exactly this would play out... I'm more than a little weirded out by the status of prophet that he has been accorded since." Others noted that: "The problem is that even though he was spectacularly right on this one, he went on to predict time and time again, as the markets and the economy recovered in the years following the collapse, that there would be a follow-up crisis and that more extreme crashes were inevitable. His calls, after his initial pronouncement, were consistently wrong. Indeed, if you had listened to him, and many investors did, you would have missed the longest bull market run in US market history." Another observed: "For a prophet, he's wrong an awful lot of the time." Tony Robbins wrote: "Roubini warned of a recession in 2004 (wrongly), 2005 (wrongly), 2006 (wrongly), and 2007 (wrongly)" ... and he "predicted (wrongly) that there'd be a 'significant' stock market correction in 2013." Speaking about Roubini, economist Anirvan Banerji told The New York Times: "Even a stopped clock is right twice a day," and said: "The average time between recessions is about five years ... So, if you forecast a recession one year and it doesn't happen, and you repeat your forecast year after year ... at some point the recession will arrive." Economist Nariman Behravesh said: "Nouriel Roubini has been singing the doom-and-gloom story for 10 years. Eventually something was going to be right."

In 2006, Roubini warned that a housing bust would trigger a global banking crisis and deep recession within a few years. U.S. subprime collapse spread through the financial system; the 2008 financial crisis ensued, and as a result he was known as Dr. Doom. In 2020, he argued the COVID-19-related recession would produce a slump "deeper than 2008" unless policy action was swift. The World Bank soon confirmed the worst global contraction since World War II (–5.2 % GDP in 2020). In 2021, he warned that post‑COVID-19 pandemic supply shocks plus loose policy could bring a stagflationary decade. Inflation in advanced economies shot to multi‑decade highs (U.S. CPI 6.8% y/y by December 2021) and growth slowed, reviving stagflation talk.

In January 2009, Roubini predicted that oil prices would stay below $40 for all of 2009. By the end of 2009, however, oil prices were at $80. In March 2009, he predicted the S&P 500 would fall below 600 that year, and possibly plummet to 200. It closed at over 1,115 however, up 24%, the largest single-year gain since 2003. CNBC's Jim Cramer wrote that Roubini was "intoxicated" with his own "prescience and vision," and should realize that things are better than he predicted; Roubini called Cramer a "buffoon," and told him to "just shut up". Although in April 2009, Roubini prophesied that the United States economy would decline in the final two quarters of 2009, and that the US economy would increase just 0.5% to 1% in 2010, in fact the U.S. economy in each of those six quarters increased at a 2.5% average annual rate. Then in June 2009 he predicted that what he called a "perfect storm" was just around the corner, but no such perfect storm ever appeared. In 2009 he also predicted that the US government would take over and nationalize a number of large banks; it did not happen. In October 2009 he predicted that the price of gold "can go above $1,000, but it can't move up 20-30%"; he was wrong, as the price of gold rose over the next 18 months, breaking through the $1,000 barrier to over $1,400.

Although in May 2010 he predicted a 20% decline in the stock market, the S&P actually rose about 20% over the course of the next year (even excluding returns from dividends). In 2012, Roubini predicted that Greece would be ejected from the Eurozone, but that did not happen. The Financial Times observed that in 2020 when the COVID-19 pandemic arrived, he said that policymakers would not mount a large fiscal response. However—they did. Also in 2020, he predicted that a US-Iran war was likely.

Journalist Alex Pareene called Roubini the "Joe Francis of Pessimism Porn," for writing multiple doomsday columns, including a 2009 column in the Washington Post declaring that unless the U.S. government seized and nationalized all US banks the system would collapse; that was simply untrue, it turned out. By highlighting that certain of his past predictions were accurate, Roubini has promoted himself as a major figure in the U.S. and international debate about the economy, and spent much of his time shuttling between meetings with central bank governors and finance ministers in Europe and Asia. Although he was ranked only 1,559th in terms of lifetime academic citations in December 2025, he was No. 4 on Foreign Policy magazine's list of the "top 100 global thinkers." In 2011 and 2012, he was named by the magazine as one of the Top 100 Global Thinkers.

== Bitcoin and cryptocurrency ==
He is a frequent critic of Bitcoin and other cryptocurrencies. Roubini has tweeted:

99% of crypto land is one shitcoin traded for another shitcoin. And the average shitcoin lost 90% or more of its value in the last year. So Crypto Land is Crap Land, a cesspool of lunatics with severe Freudian scatological obsessions that swim 24/7 in their own stinking shit.

He views blockchain as, "the byword for a libertarian ideology that treats all governments, central banks, traditional financial institutions, and real-world currencies as evil concentrations of power that must be destroyed." Roubini regards cryptocurrencies and blockchain as both utopian and at bottom "about greed" in relation to their promoters.

In 2018, he told Ethereum founder Vitalik Buterin to "just shut up." In 2019, Roubini called BitMEX CEO Arthur Hayes a "sleazy coward," and told him to "shut up."

== Consulting businesses ==
In 2005, Roubini co-founded Roubini Global Economics, a small economic consultancy for financial analysis. As of 2011, the firm was not profitable. Roubini said: "The most important thing in this kind of business is that you have to be right day in and day out. The fact that I made a right call a few years ago doesn’t matter." Roubini closed the firm in 2016.

In 2017, he founded Roubini Macro Associates, a global macroeconomic consultancy firm in New York, and co-founded Rosa & Roubini Associates. In 2021, he co-founded Atlas Capital Team LP.

== Personal life ==
Journalist Helaine Olen described Roubini as having "an accent reminiscent of a James Bond villain, and a laugh that seems to kick in on a one-second tape delay." The Financial Times wrote: "when you meet him, his unflinching, unsmiling, uncompromising negativity feels like a break with normal human coping mechanisms." New York Times journalist Stephen Mihm wrote: "With a dour manner and an aura of gloom about him, Roubini gives the impression of being permanently pained.... He rarely smiles, and when he does, his face... contorts into something more closely resembling a grimace."

Asked to describe his parties at his apartment, Roubini said: "I look for ten girls to one guy." He added that his friend Bill Clinton was a fan of this ratio.

Roubini speaks English, Persian, Italian, Hebrew, and conversational French. He is a U.S. citizen, and is identified as a Democrat in his profile on Wall Street Economists.

During an interview on Bloomberg Television, Roubini noted that he has never bought any individual security, invests for the long-term, and has a diversified portfolio.

== Writings ==
=== Book ===
In 2022, Roubini predicted ten large‑scale, mutually‑reinforcing dangers that he said could collide over the next decade, if policymakers were to stay on their track, stressing the inter‑connection, saying that addressing each in isolation would not work. First was the "Mother‑of‑All" debt crisis as public‑ and private‑sector would leverage above 350% of global GDP and sovereigns, households, and firms would all be over‑levered. As of May 2025, global public debt was rising in 80% of economies and—with no policies change—could top 100% of world GDP by 2030. Second was the "Ultra‑Easy Money & Boom‑Bust Cycles" that he said would keep inflating asset bubbles. As of April 2025, the zero‑rate era was over, but debt‑service costs soared while growth stayed sub‑par; even advanced‑economy central banks cautioned that "elevated rates amid record debt weigh on activity". Third was "Demographic Time‑Bombs" as ageing populations would shrink workforces and strain pensions. As of 2024, United Nations data indicated the working‑age share was already shrinking in a quarter of countries while global life expectancy kept climbing, straining pension systems.

Roubin fourth's prediction was a "Long Stretch of Stagflation" with weak growth and stubborn inflation after repeated supply shocks. As of March 2025, growth slowed to ~2.8 % while core services inflation proved sticky, prompting the OECD to flag a "stagflation‐style" risk. Fifth was "Currency and Monetary‑System Turmoil" as cryptocurrencies, CBDCs, and the waning U.S. dollar challenged the established order. As of July 2025, 72 countries were building or running CBDCs, BRICS talked up local‑currency trade, and Washington banned a digital‑dollar pilot—potentially ceding ground abroad. Sixth was "Deglobalization and Weaponized Trade" that would splinter supply chains. As of January 2025, the United States, Japan and the Netherlands steadily expanded export controls on advanced chip equipment, while China vowed retaliation and doubled down on self‑reliance.

Roubin's seventh prediction was "AI‑ and Automation‑Driven Job Disruption" on an unprecedented scale. As of April 2025, Goldman Sachs estimated up to 50% of jobs could be fully automated by 2045 as generative AI continued to spread, while a 2024 Pew Research Center report observed that 30 percent of media jobs could be automated by 2035. Eight was "Great‑Power and Regional (Proxy) Conflicts (U.S.–China, Russia–NATO, Middle East, cyber‑warfare)". As of July 2025, U.S.–China tensions remained high as South China Sea collisions continued and a possible summit between US President Donald Trump and CCP General Secretary Xi Jinping was framed as crisis‑management, not détente. Ninth was "Climate Catastrophe" and related resource stress. As of July 2025, Europe and China were enduring record‑breaking July heatwaves, with temperatures above 46 °C and thousands of excess deaths; grid stress and wildfire losses also soared. Tenth was "Pandemics & Other Natural Mega‑Shocks" that would amplify every other threat. As of July 2025, World Health Organization logged fresh human H5N1 bird‑flu cases, reminding policymakers that zoonotic spill‑over risks remain elevated.

=== Other writings ===
- Roubini, Nouriel; Alesina, Alberto; Cohen, Gerald D. (November 14, 1997). Political Cycles and the Macroeconomy. MIT Press. ISBN 978-0-262-51094-3.
- Roubini, Nouriel; Setzer, Brad (August 2004). Bailouts or Bail-Ins: Responding to Financial Crises in Emerging Economies. Peterson Institute. ISBN 978-0-88132-371-9.
- Roubini, Nouriel; Uzan, Marc, eds. (February 28, 2006). New International Financial Architecture. Edward Elgar Publishing. ISBN 978-1-84376-808-1. OCLC 61479639.
- Roubini, Nouriel (2010). Crisis Economics: A Crash Course in the Future of Finance. Penguin Press. ISBN 978-1-10142-742-2.
- Roubini, Nouriel (2022). MegaThreats: Ten Dangerous Trends That Imperil Our Future, And How to Survive Them. Little Brown. ISBN 978-0-31628-434-9.

== See also ==
- List of people named in the Epstein files
