= Tom Tombrello =

American physicist

Tom Tombrello (1936–2014) was Robert H. Goddard Professor of Physics at the California Institute of Technology. He earned B.A., M.A., and Ph.D. degrees in physics, all at Rice University. He studied nuclear reactions in the 1960s, which helped show how chemical elements are created.

Tombrello chaired the Division of Physics, Mathematics and Astronomy at Caltech from 1998 to 2008. He helped create Physics 11, a freshman physics course and research fellowship that required students to audition by solving a pair of challenging toy research problems called "hurdles". On May 30, 1997, Tombrello received an honorary doctorate from the Faculty of Science and Technology at Uppsala University, Sweden. In 2010, Tombrello became a founding trustee of the London Institute for Mathematical Sciences.
