= Jane Tewson =

British charity worker

Jane Tewson AO CBE (born 9 January 1958) is a British charity worker and the originator of several charitable organisations and ideas for community strengthening in the UK and Australia.

== Early life and education ==
Tewson is the daughter of Edward Tewson and Jocelyn (née Johnston), a doctor in rural South East England. With dyslexia, she left Lord Williams's Grammar School in Thame without qualifications, but later attended lectures at Oxford while working as a cleaner in the city.

== Career ==
In 1981, aged 23, Tewson founded Charity Projects in London, with funding from Lord (Tim) Bell and numerous other donations. Its initial focus was tackling homelessness in Soho.

Tewson worked in a refugee camp in Sudan in 1985, where she was pronounced clinically dead after contracting cerebral malaria. She recounts the sensation of looking down on her own body and but then returning to it and surviving – there were no drugs left in the camp. Her response to the African famine, Comic Relief was launched on Christmas Day 1985 from the refugee camp in Safawa, Sudan. By 2005 Comic Relief had raised £337 million for famine relief and community development, notably for Africa and disadvantaged areas of the UK.

In 2000, Tewson moved to Melbourne, Australia, when her husband, Charles Lane, became CEO of the Myer Foundation, a philanthropic organization and then a lead civil servant at the Dept. of Victorian Communities. At the time she was suffering from ovarian cancer but survived after operations in Melbourne.

Tewson works on some inner city Melbourne projects, and elsewhere, through Igniting Change (formerly Pilotlight Australia). The book Change the World for Ten Bucks was published and German and British editions have also been released. The Dying to Know project and book (2009) is about coming to terms with death, and negotiating grief.

=== Approach ===
Tewson is known for her approach to charitable works and giving - she believes in making charity "active, emotional, involving and fun", by building connections between people of different backgrounds, cultures, wealth, and social positions. Her approach argues for "people getting directly involved and giving themselves.....", as with the Timebank concept, rather than giving money for charitable works. This "embraces human connection as a vital part of social change".

Concepts she pioneered include:

- Comic Relief (1985). Tewson left to form Pilotlight in 1995.
- Timebank (1999). Otherwise known as ONE20, encourages people from all walks of life to give time to community projects, with beneficiaries 'passing on' a similar dedication of time and effort to others. TimeBank has featured on BBC TV several times.
- The Corporate Responsibility Index in Australia, that benchmarks companies against their corporate responsibility performance.
- Melbourne Cares – promoting corporate support to disadvantaged people.
- Charitable Projects ran the Holborn Great Investment Race – which challenged investment companies in the City of London to accrue maximum returns (within ethical guidelines) on 'seed money' donated by Prudential Holborn Trust. In two years, over £1.5 million was raised and donated to charity.
- Feet First for Homeless People saw central London commuters walking home in the evening, and donate the money saved in fares to help young homeless people living in the West End. This raised £100,000 in four weeks.
- Pilotlight undertook further unconventional activities like Real Deal, which brought together homeless and disadvantaged young people with key policy-makers to speak about drugs, health, education and so-on. A "closed doors" workshop took place between young people and Cabinet Ministers at 11 Downing Street.
- With her husband, Tewson organised Whose land?, which funded exchange visits between East African Maasai pastoralists and Australian Aborigine communities, both fighting to regain land rights.

== Awards and honours ==
- In 1999 Tewson received a CBE from HM Queen Elizabeth II for her foundational work with Charity Projects and other projects.
- In March 2000, she was named by The Times newspaper as one of the top ten innovators of the 1990s in the UK.
- In 2007 she was named Social Entrepreneur of the year for VIC and TAS, by Ernst and Young.
- Beacon Awards Winners 2010, Philanthropy Advocate Award, UK
- Among numerous other roles, she has been Trustee of The Media Trust, The Camelot Foundation, Oxfam, and she served on the Diana, Princess of Wales, Memorial Committee. She sits on the boards of the Reichstein Foundation, the St James Ethics Centre and Talent.
- In 2020, Melbourne journalist and writer Martin Flanagan published The Art of Pollination: The Irrepressible Jane Tewson. Hardie Grant Books. ISBN 9781743796689. It was discussed with Richard Branson in 2022.
- Tewson was appointed an Officer of the Order of Australia in the 2024 King's Birthday Honours.
