= BitMEX =

Cryptocurrency trading exchange

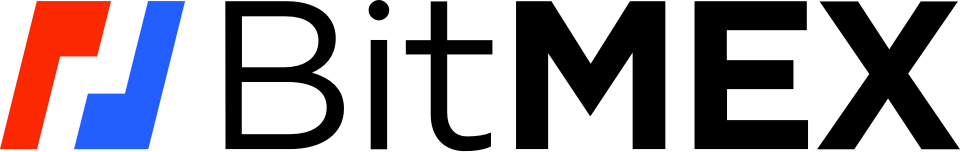
- Founded: 2014
- Founders: Arthur Hayes, Ben Delo, and Samuel Reed
- Headquarters: Seychelles
- Products: Cryptocurrency exchange
- Website: www.bitmex.com

BitMEX was a cryptocurrency exchange and derivative trading platform incorporated in the Seychelles. It was operated by HDR Global Trading Limited.

== History ==
BitMEX was founded in 2014 by Arthur Hayes, Ben Delo, and Samuel Reed, with financing from family and friends. BitMEX completed a SAFE round of investment in July 2015 then shortly after was inducted into SOSV batch 8 china accelerator program where it sold equity in exchange for labour and financing.

In 2016, the exchange introduced perpetual futures, which became its most popular derivative product. In 2018, Delo became the United Kingdom's first billionaire from bitcoin, and its youngest self-made billionaire.

In July 2019, Nouriel Roubini, a critic of cryptocurrencies, suggested that the exchange was involved in illegal activities, allowing traders to take on too much risk and by trading against clients. Two days later, it was reported by Bloomberg that the Commodity Futures Trading Commission (CFTC) was investigating BitMEX as to whether they broke rules by allowing Americans to trade on the platform.

On 1 October 2020, Hayes, Reed, Delo, and Gregory Dwyer were indicted on charges of violating the US Bank Secrecy Act and conspiracy to violate that law, arising from allegations that the four failed to implement anti-money laundering measures. The case name is "U.S. v. Hayes et al", case number of 20-cr-00500, in the US District Court for the Southern District of New York.

On 6 April 2021, former BitMEX CEO Arthur Hayes turned himself in to face US charges for violating the Bank Secrecy Act. He was released on $10 million bond pending future court proceedings in New York.

On 24 February 2022, Delo and Hayes pled guilty to violating the Bank Secrecy Act by wilfully failing to establish, implement, and maintain an anti-money laundering program at BitMEX. The pair agreed to separately pay a $10 million criminal fine representing pecuniary gain derived from the offence.

On 9 March 2022, Reed pleaded guilty to violating the Bank Secrecy Act and agreed to pay a $10 million criminal fine. Reed was sentenced by US District Court Judge John George Koeltl in New York to probation along with the other co-founders. Gregory Dwyer's trial was initially scheduled for October 2022, and subsequently pled guilty and received a 12-month probation and $150,000 fine as punishment.

On 20 May 2022, Hayes was sentenced to two years' probation, with home confinement for six months.

On 15 June 2022, Delo was sentenced to 30 months' probation and as a UK citizen returned to Hong Kong subsequently to serve his probation.

In July 2024, BitMEX pleaded guilty to violating the Bank Secrecy Act due to failing to maintain an adequate anti-money laundering program. On 15 January 2025, the company was fined $100 million.

In March 2025, President Trump issued four federal pardons to individuals associated with BitMEX, and one to the exchange itself. This was the first time a pardon was granted to a corporation rather than a natural person. Trump issued the pardon hours before the payment of $100 million was due, which according to The Guardian saved BitMEX the money to the detriment of the Crime Victims Fund.

In September 2026, Delo donated £36 million to the right-wing British party Reform UK, which became the largest donation to a political party in British history at that point; he said that the purpose of the donation was to "level [the] playing field" against the Conservatives and Labour.

In September 2026, BitMEX permanently closed its exchange.
