= List of independent research organisations in the United Kingdom =

An independent research organisation (IRO) is an independent research centre that is eligible to compete with universities for research grant funding from the seven research councils of the United Kingdom.

The Arts and Humanities Research Council was able to grant IRO status to cultural and heritage organisations from 2006/7.

== Anthony Nolan ==
Anthony Nolan is a UK charity that works in the areas of leukaemia and hematopoietic stem cell transplantation. It manages and recruits donors to the Anthony Nolan Register, which is part of an aligned registry that also includes the Welsh Bone Marrow Donor Registry, NHS Blood and Transplant's British Bone Marrow Registry and Deutsche KnochenMarkSpenderdate(DKMS) UK. This aligned register is known as the Anthony Nolan & NHS Stem Cell Registry. It also carries out research to help make bone marrow transplants more effective.

== Armagh Observatory ==
Armagh Observatory is an astronomical research institute in Armagh, Northern Ireland. Around 25 astronomers are based at the observatory, studying stellar astrophysics, the Sun, Solar System astronomy and Earth's climate.

== Beatson Institute for Cancer Research ==
The Beatson West of Scotland Cancer Centre (BWSCC; formerly called the Beatson Oncology Centre) is a specialised cancer care centre in Glasgow, Scotland. Until recently it had facilities in Gartnavel General Hospital, the Western Infirmary and Glasgow Royal Infirmary. As part of the NHS Greater Glasgow and Clyde Acute Services Review, the centre is being centralised within new facilities at the Gartnavel General Hospital site.

== BirdLife International ==
BirdLife International is a global partnership of non-governmental organizations that strives to conserve birds and their habitats. BirdLife International's priorities include preventing extinction of bird species, identifying and safeguarding important sites for birds, maintaining and restoring key bird habitats, and empowering conservationists worldwide.

== British Film Institute ==
The British Film Institute (BFI) is a film and television charitable organisation which promotes and preserves filmmaking and television in the United Kingdom. The BFI uses lottery funds to encourage film production, distribution, and education. It is sponsored by the Department for Digital, Culture, Media and Sport.

== British Library ==
The British Library is the national library of the United Kingdom and the largest library in the world by number of items catalogued. It is estimated to contain 170–200 million items from many countries. As a legal deposit library, the British Library receives copies of all books produced in the United Kingdom and Ireland, including a significant proportion of overseas titles distributed in the UK. The Library is a non-departmental public body sponsored by the Department for Digital, Culture, Media and Sport.

== British Museum ==
The British Museum, in the Bloomsbury area of London, United Kingdom, is a public institution dedicated to human history, art and culture. Its permanent collection of some eight million works is among the largest and most comprehensive in existence, having been widely sourced during the era of the British Empire. It documents the story of human culture from its beginnings to the present. (Note: Sculptures and applied art are in the Victoria and Albert Museum; the British Museum houses earlier art, non-Western art, prints and drawings. Art of a later date is at Tate Modern. The National Gallery holds the National Collection of Western European Art. Tate Britain holds British Art from 1500 onwards.) It was the first public national museum in the world.

== British Trust for Ornithology ==
The British Trust for Ornithology (BTO) is an organisation founded in 1932 for the study of birds in the British Isles.

== CAB International ==
Centre for Agriculture and Bioscience International (legal name CAB International) is a not-for-profit inter-governmental development and information organisation focusing primarily on agricultural and environmental issues in the developing world, and the creation, curation and dissemination of scientific knowledge.

== Cambridge Crystallographic Data Centre ==
The Cambridge Crystallographic Data Centre (CCDC) is a crystallographic organisation based in Cambridge, England. It is a non-profit charity whose primary role is the compilation and maintenance of the Cambridge Structural Database, a database of small molecule crystal structures. They also perform analysis on the database for the benefit of the scientific community, and write and distribute computer software to allow others to do the same.

== Chatham House (Royal Institute of International Affairs) ==
Chatham House, also known as the Royal Institute of International Affairs, is a non-profit, non-governmental organisation based in London. Its mission is to analyse and promote the understanding of major international issues and current affairs. It is the originator of the Chatham House Rule.

== CERN ==
The European Organization for Nuclear Research (French: Organisation européenne pour la recherche nucléaire), known as CERN (/sɜːrn/; French pronunciation: [sɛʁn]; derived from the name Conseil européen pour la recherche nucléaire), is a European research organization that operates the largest particle physics laboratory in the world. Established in 1954, the organization is based in a northwest suburb of Geneva on the Franco–Swiss border and has 23 member states. Israel is the only non-European country granted full membership. CERN is an official United Nations Observer.

== Earthwatch Institute ==
Earthwatch Institute is an international environmental charity founded as Educational Expeditions International in 1971 near Boston (USA) by Robert A. Citron and Clarence Truesdale, then superintendent of Vermont public schools. It is one of the largest global underwriters of scientific field research in archaeology, paleontology, marine life, biodiversity, ecosystems and wildlife. For over forty years, Earthwatch has delivered a unique citizen science model to raise funds and recruit individuals, students, teachers and corporate fellows to participate in critical field research to understand nature's response to accelerating global change. Earthwatch's work supports hundreds of Ph.D. researchers across dozens of countries, conducting over 100,000 hours of research annually.

== EMBL - European Bioinformatics Institute ==
The European Bioinformatics Institute (EMBL-EBI) is an International Governmental Organization (IGO) which, as part of the European Molecular Biology Laboratory (EMBL) family, focuses on research and services in bioinformatics. It is located on the Wellcome Genome Campus in Hinxton near Cambridge, and employs over 600 full-time equivalent (FTE) staff. Institute leaders such as Rolf Apweiler, Alex Bateman, Ewan Birney, and Guy Cochrane, an adviser on the National Genomics Data Center Scientific Advisory Board, serve as part of the international research network of the BIG Data Center at the Beijing Institute of Genomics.

== European Synchrotron Radiation Facility ==
The European Synchrotron Radiation Facility (ESRF) is a joint research facility situated in Grenoble, France, and supported by 22 countries (13 member countries: France, Germany, Italy, UK, Spain, Switzerland, Belgium, The Netherlands, Denmark, Finland, Norway, Sweden, Russia and 9 associate countries: Austria, Portugal, Israel, Poland, Czech Republic, Hungary, Slovakia, India and South Africa).

== Historic Buildings and Monuments Commission for England ==
Historic England (officially the Historic Buildings and Monuments Commission for England) is an executive non-departmental public body of the British Government sponsored by the Department for Culture, Media and Sport (DCMS). It is tasked with protecting the historic environment of England by preserving and listing historic buildings, scheduling monuments, registering historic parks and gardens and by advising central and local government.

== Historic Environment Scotland ==
Historic Environment Scotland (HES) (Scottish Gaelic: Àrainneachd Eachdraidheil Alba) is an executive non-departmental public body responsible for investigating, caring for and promoting Scotland's historic environment. HES was formed in 2015 from the merger of government agency Historic Scotland with the Royal Commission on the Ancient and Historical Monuments of Scotland (RCAHMS). Among other duties, Historic Environment Scotland maintains more than 300 properties of national importance including Edinburgh Castle, Skara Brae and Fort George.

== Historic Royal Palaces ==
Historic Royal Palaces is an independent charity that manages some of the United Kingdom's unoccupied royal palaces.

== Imperial War Museum ==
Imperial War Museums (IWM) is a British national museum organisation with branches at five locations in England, three of which are in London. Founded as the Imperial War Museum in 1917, the museum was intended to record the civil and military war effort and sacrifice of Britain and its Empire during the First World War. The museum's remit has since expanded to include all conflicts in which British or Commonwealth forces have been involved since 1914. As of 2012, the museum aims "to provide for, and to encourage, the study and understanding of the history of modern war and 'wartime experience'."

== Institute for Fiscal Studies ==
The Institute for Fiscal Studies (IFS) is an economic research institute based in London, United Kingdom, which specialises in UK taxation and public policy. It produces both academic and policy-related findings.

== Institute of Development Studies ==
The Institute of Development Studies (IDS) is an institution for development research, teaching and learning, and impact and communications, based at the University of Sussex. It is ranked first in the world for development studies in the 2020 edition of the QS World University Rankings and is consistently ranked among the world's top development research centres.

== Institute of Occupational Medicine ==
The Institute of Occupational Medicine (IOM) was founded in 1969 by the National Coal Board (NCB) as an independent charity in the UK and retains this charitable purpose and status today. The "Institute" has a subsidiary, IOM Consulting Limited, which became fully independent in 1990 and now celebrates its 25th year within the IOM Group as an independent consultancy and also the commercial part of the IOM organization. It specializes in asbestos surveys and services, occupational hygiene services, nanotechnology safety, laboratory analysis and expert witness consulting services. IOM is therefore one of the UK's major independent "not for profit" centres of scientific excellence in the fields of environmental health, occupational hygiene and occupational safety. Its mission is to benefit those at work and in the community by providing quality research, consultancy, surveys, analysis and training and by maintaining an independent, impartial position as an international centre of excellence.

== International Institute for Environment and Development ==
The International Institute for Environment and Development (IIED) is an independent policy research institute (think tank) whose stated mission is to "build a fairer, more sustainable world, using evidence, action and influence in partnership with others." Its director is Dr Andrew Norton.

== London Institute for Mathematical Sciences (LIMS) ==
The London Institute for Mathematical Sciences is a private academic institute for curiosity-driven research in physics, mathematics and the theoretical sciences.

== Marine Biological Association ==
The Marine Biological Association of the United Kingdom (MBA) is a learned society with a scientific laboratory that undertakes research in marine biology. The organisation was founded in 1884 and has been based in Plymouth since the Citadel Hill Laboratory was opened on 30 June 1888.

== Moredun Research Institute ==
Moredun employs over 200 vets, scientists and support staff, that are funded primarily by the Agriculture, Food and Rural Communities Directorate of the Scottish Government. The Institute received £7.1 million from the government in 2010–11.

== Museum of London Archaeology ==
MOLA (Museum of London Archaeology) is an archaeology and built heritage practice and independent charitable company registered with the Chartered Institute for Archaeologists (CIfA), providing a wide range of professional archaeological services to clients in London and across the country. It is one of the largest archaeological service providers in the UK, and is the only one with IRO (Independent Research Organisation) status.

== National Archives ==
National archives are the archives of a country. The concept evolved in various nations at the dawn of modernity based on the impact of nationalism upon bureaucratic processes of paperwork retention.

== National Centre for Social Research ==
The National Centre for Social Research is a registered charity trading as NatCen Social Research and is the largest independent social research institute in the UK. The research charity was founded in 1969 by Sir Roger Jowell and Gerald Hoinville with the aim of carrying out rigorous social policy research to improve society.

== National Gallery ==
The National Gallery is an art museum in Trafalgar Square in the City of Westminster, in Central London. Founded in 1824, it houses a collection of over 2,300 paintings dating from the mid-13th century to 1900.

== National Institute of Economic and Social Research ==
The National Institute of Economic and Social Research (NIESR), established in 1938, is Britain's oldest independent economic research institute. The institute is a London-based independent UK registered charity that carries out academic research of relevance to business and policy makers, both nationally and internationally.

== National Maritime Museum ==
The National Maritime Museum (NMM) is a maritime museum in Greenwich, London. It is part of Royal Museums Greenwich, a network of museums in the Maritime Greenwich World Heritage Site. Like other publicly funded national museums in the United Kingdom, it has no general admission charge; there are admission charges for most side-gallery temporary exhibitions, usually supplemented by many loaned works from other museums.

== National Museum Wales ==
Amgueddfa Cymru – National Museum Wales, formerly the National Museums and Galleries of Wales, is a Welsh Government sponsored body that comprises seven museums in Wales.

== National Museums Liverpool ==
National Museums Liverpool, formerly National Museums and Galleries on Merseyside, comprises several museums and art galleries in and around Liverpool, England. All the museums and galleries in the group have free admission. The museum is a non-departmental public body sponsored by the Department for Culture, Media and Sport and an exempt charity under English law.

== National Museums of Scotland ==
National Museums Scotland (NMS; Scottish Gaelic: Taigh-tasgaidh Nàiseanta na h-Alba) is an executive non-departmental public body of the Scottish Government. It runs the national museums of Scotland.

== National Oceanography Centre ==
The National Oceanography Centre (NOC) is a marine science research and technology institution based on two sites in Southampton and Liverpool, United Kingdom. It is the UK's largest institution for integrated sea level science, coastal and deep ocean research and technology development.

== National Portrait Gallery ==
The National Portrait Gallery (NPG) is an art gallery in London housing a collection of portraits of historically important and famous British people. It was the first portrait gallery in the world when it opened in 1856. The gallery moved in 1896 to its current site at St Martin's Place, off Trafalgar Square, and adjoining the National Gallery. It has been expanded twice since then. The National Portrait Gallery also has regional outposts at Beningbrough Hall in Yorkshire and Montacute House in Somerset. It is unconnected to the Scottish National Portrait Gallery in Edinburgh, with which its remit overlaps. The gallery is a non-departmental public body sponsored by the Department for Digital, Culture, Media and Sport.

== Natural History Museum ==
The Natural History Museum in London is a natural history museum that exhibits a vast range of specimens from various segments of natural history. It is one of three major museums on Exhibition Road in South Kensington, the others being the Science Museum and the Victoria and Albert Museum. The Natural History Museum's main frontage, however, is on Cromwell Road.

== Nesta ==
Nesta (formerly NESTA, National Endowment for Science, Technology and the Arts) is an innovation foundation based in the UK. The organisation acts through a combination of programmes, investment, policy and research, and the formation of partnerships to promote innovation across a broad range of sectors.

== Overseas Development Institute ==
The Overseas Development Institute (ODI) is an independent think tank on international development and humanitarian issues, founded in 1960. Based in London, its mission is "to inspire and inform policy and practice which lead to the reduction of poverty, the alleviation of suffering and the achievement of sustainable livelihoods in developing countries." It does this by "locking together high-quality applied research, practical policy advice, and policy-focused dissemination and debate."

== Royal Botanic Gardens - Edinburgh ==
The Royal Botanic Garden Edinburgh (RBGE) is a scientific centre for the study of plants, their diversity and conservation, as well as a popular tourist attraction. Founded in 1670 as a physic garden to grow medicinal plants, today it occupies four sites across Scotland—Edinburgh, Dawyck, Logan and Benmore—each with its own specialist collection. The RBGE's living collection consists of more than 13,302 plant species, (34,422 accessions) whilst the herbarium contains in excess of 3 million preserved specimens.

== Royal Botanic Gardens – Kew ==
Royal Botanic Gardens, Kew (brand name Kew), is a non-departmental public body in the United Kingdom sponsored by the Department for Environment, Food and Rural Affairs. An internationally important botanical research and education institution, it employs 1,100 staff. Its board of trustees is chaired by Dame Amelia Fawcett.

== Royal Society for the Protection of Birds ==
The Royal Society for the Protection of Birds (RSPB) is a charitable organisation registered in England and Wales and in Scotland. It was founded in 1889. It works to promote conservation and protection of birds and the wider environment through public awareness campaigns, petitions and through the operation of nature reserves throughout the United Kingdom.

== Royal United Services Institute for Defence and Security Studies ==
The Royal United Services Institute for Defence and Security Studies (RUSI), sometimes still referred to by its pre-2004 name, the Royal United Service Institution, is a British defence and security think tank. It was founded in 1831 by the Duke of Wellington, Sir Arthur Wellesley.

== Science Museum Group ==
The Science Museum Group (SMG)

- The Science Museum in South Kensington, London
- The Science and Industry Museum in Manchester
- The National Railway Museum in York
- Locomotion in County Durham
- The National Science and Media Museum (formerly the National Media Museum and the National Museum of Photography, Film and Television) in Bradford, and
- The National Collections Centre Museum in Swindon, Wiltshire.

== Sightsavers ==
Sightsavers is an international non-governmental organisation that works with partners in developing countries to treat and prevent avoidable blindness, and promote equality for people with visual impairments and other disabilities. It is based in Haywards Heath in the United Kingdom, with branches in Sweden, Norway, India, Italy, Republic of Ireland, the United Arab Emirates, and the USA.

== Tate ==
Tate is an institution that houses, in a network of four art museums, the United Kingdom's national collection of British art, and international modern and contemporary art. It is not a government institution, but its main sponsor is the UK Department for Digital, Culture, Media and Sport.

== Tavistock Institute of Human Relations ==
The Tavistock Institute of Human Relations or TIHR is a British not-for-profit organisation which applies social science to contemporary issues and problems. It was initiated in 1946, when it developed from the Tavistock Clinic, and was formally established as a separate entity in September 1947. The journal Human Relations is published on behalf of the Tavistock Institute by Sage Publications. The institute is located in Tabernacle Street in Islington, London.

== The National Trust ==
The National Trust for Places of Historic Interest or Natural Beauty, commonly known as the National Trust, is a charity and membership organisation for heritage conservation in England, Wales and Northern Ireland. In Scotland, there is a separate and independent National Trust for Scotland.

== The Office of the Health Economics ==
The Office of Health Economics (OHE) is a research and consultancy company and registered charity based in London.

== The Welding Institute ==
The Welding Institute (TWI) is a research and technology organisation, with a specialty in welding. With headquarters six miles south of Cambridge, Cambridgeshire, England, since 1946, and with facilities across the UK and around the world. TWI works across all industry sectors and in all aspects of manufacturing, fabrication and whole-life integrity management technologies.

== The James Hutton Institute ==
The James Hutton Institute is an interdisciplinary scientific research institute in Scotland established in 2011, through the merger of Scottish Crop Research Institute (SCRI) and the Macaulay Land Use Research Institute. The institute, named after Scottish geologist James Hutton, one of the leading figures of the Scottish Enlightenment, combines existing Scottish expertise in agricultural research, soils and land use, and works in fields including food and energy security, biodiversity, and climate change. With more than 600 employees, the institute is among the largest research centres in the UK. It is a registered charity under Scottish law.

== Transport Research Laboratory Limited ==
TRL Limited, trading as TRL (formerly Transport Research Laboratory) is an independent private company offering a transport consultancy and research service to the public and private sector. Originally established in 1933 by the UK Government as the Road Research Laboratory (RRL), it was privatised in 1996. Its motto or tagline is 'The Future of Transport'.

== UK Centre for Ecology and Hydrology ==
The UK Centre for Ecology & Hydrology (UKCEH) is a centre for excellence in environmental science across water, land and air. The organisation has a long history of investigating, monitoring and modelling environmental change, and its science makes a difference in the world. The issues that its science addresses include: air pollution, biodiversity, chemical risks in the environment, extreme weather events, droughts, floods, greenhouse gas emissions, soil health, sustainable agriculture, sustainable ecosystems, water quality, and water resources management.

== Unlimit Health ==
Unlimit Health is an international organisation working to end parasitic disease, including schistosomiasis and soil-transmitted helminthiasis. It was founded in 2002 with a £20m grant from the Bill & Melinda Gates Foundation, and started life as a research group within Imperial College.

== Victoria and Albert Museum ==
The Victoria and Albert Museum (often abbreviated as the V&A) in London is the world's largest museum of applied and decorative arts and design, as well as sculpture, housing a permanent collection of over 2.27 million objects. It was founded in 1852 and named after Queen Victoria and Prince Albert.

== Wellcome Trust Sanger institute ==
The Wellcome Sanger Institute, previously known as The Sanger Centre and Wellcome Trust Sanger Institute, is a non-profit British genomics and genetics research institute, primarily funded by the Wellcome Trust.

== World Conservation Monitoring Centre WCMC ==
The UN Environment Programme World Conservation Monitoring Centre (UNEP-WCMC) is an executive agency of UN Environment Programme, based in Cambridge in the United Kingdom. UNEP-WCMC has been part of UN Environment Programme since 2000, and has responsibility for biodiversity assessment and support to policy development and implementation. The World Conservation Monitoring Centre was previously an independent organisation jointly managed by IUCN, UN Environment Programme and WWF established in 1988, and prior to that the centre was a part of the IUCN Secretariat.

== Young Foundation ==
The Young Foundation is a non-profit, non-governmental think tank based in London that specialises in social innovation to tackle structural inequality.

== Zoological Society of London, Institute of Zoology ==
The Zoological Society of London (ZSL) is a charity devoted to the worldwide conservation of animals and their habitats. It was founded in 1826.
