= Yang-Hui He =

Mathematical physicist

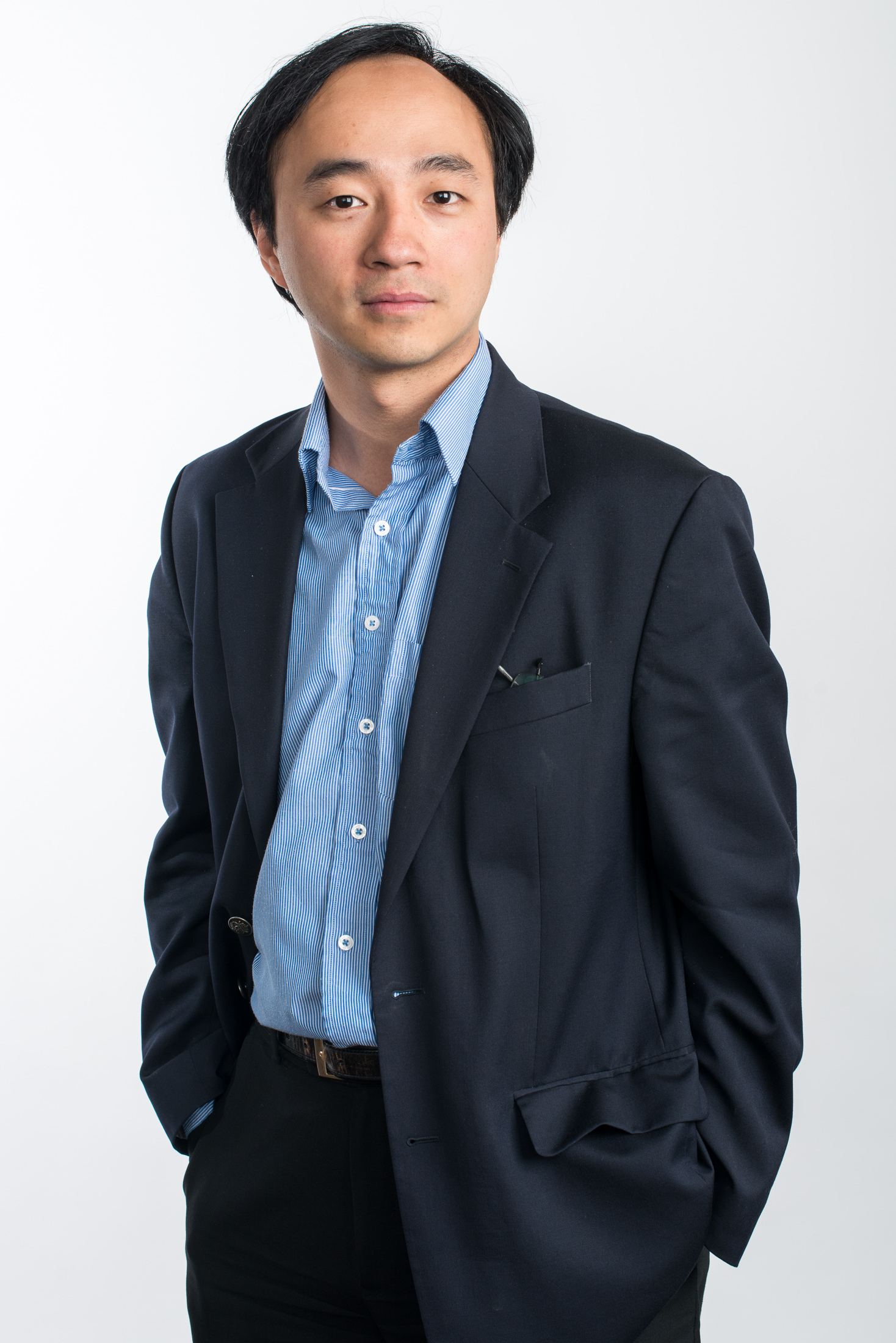
- Education: Princeton University; Cambridge University; Massachusetts Institute of Technology
- Scientific career
- Fields: Mathematical Physics
- Workplaces: London Institute for Mathematical Sciences; University of Oxford; University of London; Nankai University; University of Pennsylvania
- Doctoral advisor: Amihay Hanany

Yang-Hui He (simplified Chinese: 何杨辉; traditional Chinese: 何楊輝; pinyin: Hé Yáng Huī; born 29 September 1975) is a mathematical physicist, who is a Fellow at the London Institute, which is based at the Royal Institution of Great Britain, as well as lecturer and former Fellow at Merton College, Oxford. He holds honorary positions as visiting professor of mathematics at City, University of London, Chang-Jiang Chair professor at Nankai University, and President of STEMM Global scientific society.

Yang works on the interface between quantum field theory, string theory, algebraic geometry and number theory, as well as how AI and machine-learning help with these problems. He is one of the pioneers of the field of using AI for pure mathematics.

Yang is author of over 200 scientific publications and is also a keen communicator of science, giving regular public lectures including the Royal Institution Friday Evening Discourse, as well as podcasts. His other outreach activities include acting as an advisor to BMUCO and being a fellow of the One Garden.

== Education and career ==
Yang received his A.B. in Physics from Princeton University in 1996, with Highest Honours (summa cum laude, Allen Shenstone Prize and Kusaka Memorial Prize), joint with certificates in applied mathematics and in engineering physics. He received his Masters from University of Cambridge in 1997 with Distinction and then obtained his PhD from MIT in 2002 in the Center for Theoretical Physics (NSF Scholarship and MIT Presidential Award) under the supervision of Amihay Hanany.

After postdoctoral work at the University of Pennsylvania, in the group of Burt Ovrut, Yang joined the University of Oxford as FitzJames Fellow and Advanced Fellow of the STFC, UK, working closely with Philip Candelas. He remains a tutor at Merton College, Oxford when taking up his professorships at the University of London and Nankai University, and more recently, when he joined the London Institute.

== Works ==
Yang has authored over 200 journal papers, as well as several books, notably:

- Topology and Physics, co-edited with C. N. Yang and Mo-Lin Ge, with contributions from Sir Michael Atiyah, Edward Witten, Sir Roger Penrose, Robbert Dijkgraaf et al., recommended by Book Authority as one of the 20 most influential books in quantum field theory of all time.
- The Calabi-Yau Landscape: from geometry, to physics, to machine-learning, textbook aimed at early PhD students, introducing mathematics to physicists, physics to mathematicians and machine-learning to both, the first textbook on the AI mathematician.
- Dialogues Between Physics and Mathematics: C. N. Yang at 100, co-edited with Mo-Lin Ge, with contributions from Edward Witten, Sir Roger Penrose, Sir Anthony James Leggett, Alexander Polyakov, Vladimir Drinfeld et al., celebrating the 100th birthday of C. N. Yang.
- Machine Learning in Pure Mathematics and Theoretical Physics, the first of its kind, as a collection of essays on the interactions between AI and pure mathematics/fundamental physics.
