= Thomas Fink =

Anglo-American physicist

- Born: 1972 (age 53–54); New York City, U.S.
- Education: Caltech; Cambridge
- Awards: Fisher Prize (Physics)
- Scientific career
- Fields: Physics
- Workplaces: University of Cambridge; École normale supérieure Curie Institute; London Institute for Mathematical Sciences; University of Cambridge
- Doctoral advisor: Robin Ball
- Other academic advisors: Bernard Derrida
- Website: www.tcm.phy.cam.ac.uk/~tmf20/

Thomas Fink (born 1972) is an Anglo-American physicist, author and entrepreneur. He has published papers in statistical physics and its applications, written two books and designed an iPhone app. He set up the London Institute for Mathematical Sciences and is a manager of research at the French National Centre for Scientific Research (French: Centre national de la recherche scientifique).

== Education and positions ==
Fink did his BS at Caltech, where he won the annual Fisher Prize for top physicist and Green prize for best research. He then moved to England for his PhD at St John's College, Cambridge, where he was supervised by Robin Ball in the TCM group of the Cavendish Laboratory. He was a Research Fellow at Caius College, Cambridge and did a postdoc at École Normale Supérieure with Bernard Derrida. He now occupies his current positions at the London Institute and the CNRS.

== Research ==
Fink is a researcher in theoretical physics. He published his first paper in the journal Science at the age of 20 while at Caltech and received his PhD at the Cavendish Laboratory in Cambridge. Fink uses statistical mechanics to study complex systems in physics and interdisciplinary fields. He has recently studied role of strategy and serendipity in innovation. Other interests include evolvability, cellular automata, non-random expression, competition between agents, dynamics on networks, small boolean networks, self-assembly and non-coding DNA, according to his website.

=== Selected Papers ===
- S. Ahnert, T. Fink and A. Zinovyev, 'How much non-coding DNA do eukaryotes require?', J. Theor. Bio. 252, 587.
- F. Brown, T. Fink and K. Willbrand, ‘On arithmetic and asymptotic properties of up-down numbers’, Discrete Math. 307 1722.
- B. Derrida and T. Fink, 'Sequence determination from overlapping fragments', Phys. Rev. Lett. 88, 068106.
- T. Fink and R. Ball, 'How many conformations can a protein remember?', Phys. Rev. Lett. 87, 198103.
- T. Fink and Y. Mao, 'Designing Tie knots by random walks', Nature 398, 31.
- B. Werner and T. Fink, 'Beach cusps as self-organized patterns', Science 260, 968.

== Books ==
According to his homepage, Fink's books have sold 1/3 million copies.

The 85 Ways to Tie a Tie, (with Yong Mao, Fourth Estate, London) is a cultural, historical and mathematical examination of ties and tie knots. It explains how the authors proved mathematically that there are a total of 85 distinct tie knots, most of which had not been previously known. The book includes a layman's account of the authors' mathematical papers which derived all possible knots capable of being tied with a standard necktie. It has been published in 10 languages, including French, German, Hungarian, Portuguese and Italian.

The Man's Book (Weidenfeld & Nicolson, Orion, Little, Brown) is a handbook of men's customs, habits and pursuits. It is organized by subject, with chapters on health, dress, sports, outdoors, drinking, eating and others. The author dedicates only a few pages to each section, and within that space tries to summarize the essentials as completely and densely as possible. The book was designed and typeset by the author. The Man's Book has been reviewed in The Times (UK), the Literary Review, the New Statesman, and has been translated into German, Italian, Russian and other languages. In May 2009 IntuApps and Little, Brown released an iPhone application inspired by The Man's Book. The app hit the no. 1 spot in the Apple App Store, with over 1 million downloads, on 23 May 2009, according to the IntuApps website and Little, Brown.

== London Institute for Mathematical Sciences ==
Fink founded the London Institute for Mathematical Sciences, a non-profit institute for physics and mathematics research. In 2011 the London Institute became a registered charity in England and Wales. Located in Mayfair, London, LIMS is like a university research department, but with no teaching or administrative duties. It is private in the sense that it covers its own costs through research grants and donations. According to its website, "the London Institute gives scientists the freedom and support to do what they do best: make fundamental discoveries". As of 2014, it has six Fellows in addition to postdocs and visiting scientists.
