= Perpetual futures =

Agreements to buy or sell an asset at an unspecified point in the future

In finance, perpetual futures, also known as perpetual swaps or colloquially as perps, are contract agreements to non-optionally buy or sell an asset at an unspecified point in the future. Perpetual futures are cash-settled, and they differ from regular futures in that they lack a pre-specified delivery date and can thus be held indefinitely without the need to roll over contracts as they approach expiration. Payments are periodically exchanged between holders of the two sides of the contracts, long and short, with the direction and magnitude of the settlement based on the difference between the contract price and that of the underlying asset, as well as, if applicable, the difference in leverage between the two sides.

Perpetual futures were first proposed by economist Robert Shiller in 1992, to enable derivatives markets for illiquid assets.

Perpetuals serve the same function as contracts for difference (CFDs), allowing indefinite, leveraged tracking of an underlying asset or flow, but differ in that a single, uniform contract is traded on an exchange for all time-horizons, quantities of leverage, and positions, as opposed to separate contracts for separate quantities of leverage typically traded directly with a broker.

== Market ==
The first perpetual futures markets were developed for cryptocurrencies, with specific "inverse perpetual" type being invented by Alexey Bragin in 2011 for ICBIT exchange first, followed by their wider adoption in 2016 by other derivatives exchanges like BitMEX. Cryptocurrency perpetuals are characterised by the availability of high leverage, sometimes over 100 times the margin, and by the use of auto-deleveraging, which compels high-leverage, profitable traders to forfeit a portion of their profits to cover the losses of the other side during periods of high market volatility, as well as insurance funds, pools of assets intended to prevent the need for auto-deleveraging. Prior to the spread of stablecoins in cryptomarkets all perpetual futures traded on unlicensed crypto exchanges were inverse (non-linear) futures contract, with asset being US dollar, and the price being quoted in US dollars for 1 Bitcoin. The contract is called non-linear inverse bitcoin futures because of the added non-linearity in the calculation. This makes the contract useful as a financial instrument and enables to do all accounting in Bitcoin at the same time, unlike quanto futures, while also not requiring exchange to have financial license due to accounting not being done in any fiduciary currency.

== History ==
Holding a futures contract indefinitely requires periodically rolling over the contract into a new one before the contract's expiry. However, given that futures prices typically differ from spot prices, repeatedly rolling over contracts creates significant basis risk, leading to inefficiencies when used for hedging or speculation. In an attempt to remedy these ills, the Chinese Gold and Silver Exchange of Hong Kong developed an "undated futures" market, wherein one-day futures would be rolled over automatically, with the difference between future and spot prices settled between the counterparties.

In 1992, Robert Shiller proposed perpetual futures, alongside a method for generating asset-price indices using hedonic regression, accounting for unmeasured qualities by adding dummy variables that represent elements of the index, indicating the unique quality of each element, a form of repeated measures design. This was intended to permit the creation of derivatives markets for illiquid, infrequently-priced assets, such as single-family homes, as well as untraded indices and flows of income, such as labour costs or the consumer price index.

In 2011, Alexey Bragin developed a solution to simplify leverage trading of cryptocurrencies for unlicensed exchanges. The product provided several improvements specific to the crypto-sphere: inverse nature (asset itself used as a margin for trading) and funding mechanism (to keep perpetual futures price close to asset price, funding is paid, on a regular basis, to incentivize price move closer to asset price). These innovations enabled the setting of lots to convenient size in USD, keep price contango or backwardation under control, and settle all operations in cryptocurrency, which simplified the legal side of crypto trading. The drawback of this solution was non-linear PnL, generating specific convexity (the second derivative of a contract’s value with respect to price), so that long positions will be liquidated faster on price fall than short positions will be on price rise During the 2020s, cryptocurrency perpetual futures also began to appear on decentralized exchanges as blockchain-based derivatives markets expanded. By the mid-2020s, some self-custodial wallet providers started integrating perpetual trading interfaces directly into their applications. In 2026, MetaMask added support for perpetuals trading through the Hyperliquid platform.

In May 2026, the United States Commodity Futures Trading Commission (CFTC) approved the first perpetual futures in the US, in the form of a Kalshi market for Bitcoin perpetual futures contracts. CME Group subsequently sued the CFTC over the approval, arguing such contracts should actually be classified and regulated as swaps. In September, Kalshi launched gold and silver perpetual futures with CFTC approval. In October, Kalshi launched a "US 500" perpetual futures contract for a US large-cap stock index provided by MerQube.

== Mechanism ==
Perpetual futures for the value of a cash flow, dividend or index, as envisioned by Shiller, require the payment of a daily settlement, intended to mirror the value of the flow, from one side of the contract to the other. At any day t, the dividend $s_{t+1}$, paid from shorts to longs, is defined as:

$$s_{t+1}=(f_{t+1}-f_t)+(d_{t+1}-r_tf_t)$$

where $f_t$ is the price of the perpetual at day t, $d_t$ is the dividend paid to owners of the underlying asset on day t, and $r_t$ is the return on an alternative asset (expected to be a short-term, low-risk rate) between time t and time t + 1.

== See also ==
- Futures contract
- Contract for difference
