= Arthur Bell Hays =

American sports coach (1882–1944)

Biographical details
- Born: September 14, 1882; Gonzales County, Texas, U.S.
- Died: October 16, 1944 (aged 62); Amarillo, Texas, U.S.

Playing career

Football
- 1910: Baylor

Coaching career (HC unless noted)

Football
- 1915–1919: John Tarleton
- 1921–1923: Simmons (TX)

Basketball
- 1921–1924: Simmons (TX)

Baseball
- 1922–1924: Simmons (TX)

Head coaching record
- Overall: 14–12–3 (college football); 38–18 (college basketball); 18–30 (college baseball)

Arthur Bell Hays (September 14, 1882 – October 16, 1944) was an American football, basketball, and baseball coach. He served as the head football coach at Tarleton State University–then known at Tarleton Junior College–from 1915 to 1917 and again in 1919. He later served as the head football coach (1921–1923) and head men's basketball coach (1921–1924) at Simmons College–later known as Hardin–Simmons University.

Hays was a student at Baylor University, where he played on the football team for one season.

== Head coaching record ==
=== College football ===
Year	Team	Overall	Conference	Standing	Bowl/playoffs
John Tarleton Plowboys (Independent) (1915–1919)
1915	John Tarleton	3–4–1			
1916	John Tarleton	2–3–2			
1917	John Tarleton	5–4			
1918	No team—World War I				
1919	John Tarleton	6–1			
John Tarleton:		16–12–3			
Simmons Cowboys (Texas Intercollegiate Athletic Association) (1921–1923)
1921	Simmons	6–4	3–2	T–4th	
1922	Simmons	5–3–1	4–1–1	4th	
1923	Simmons	3–5–2	2–1–2	T–3rd	
Simmons:		14–12–3	9–4–3		
Total:		30–24–6			
