= London Institute for Mathematical Sciences =

Research organization in London, United Kingdom

Coordinates: 51.5098°N 0.1425°W

- Motto: Truth, Beauty
- Type: Independent research institute
- Established: 2011
- Director: Thomas Fink
- Location: The Royal Institution, London, UK
- Website: lims.ac.uk
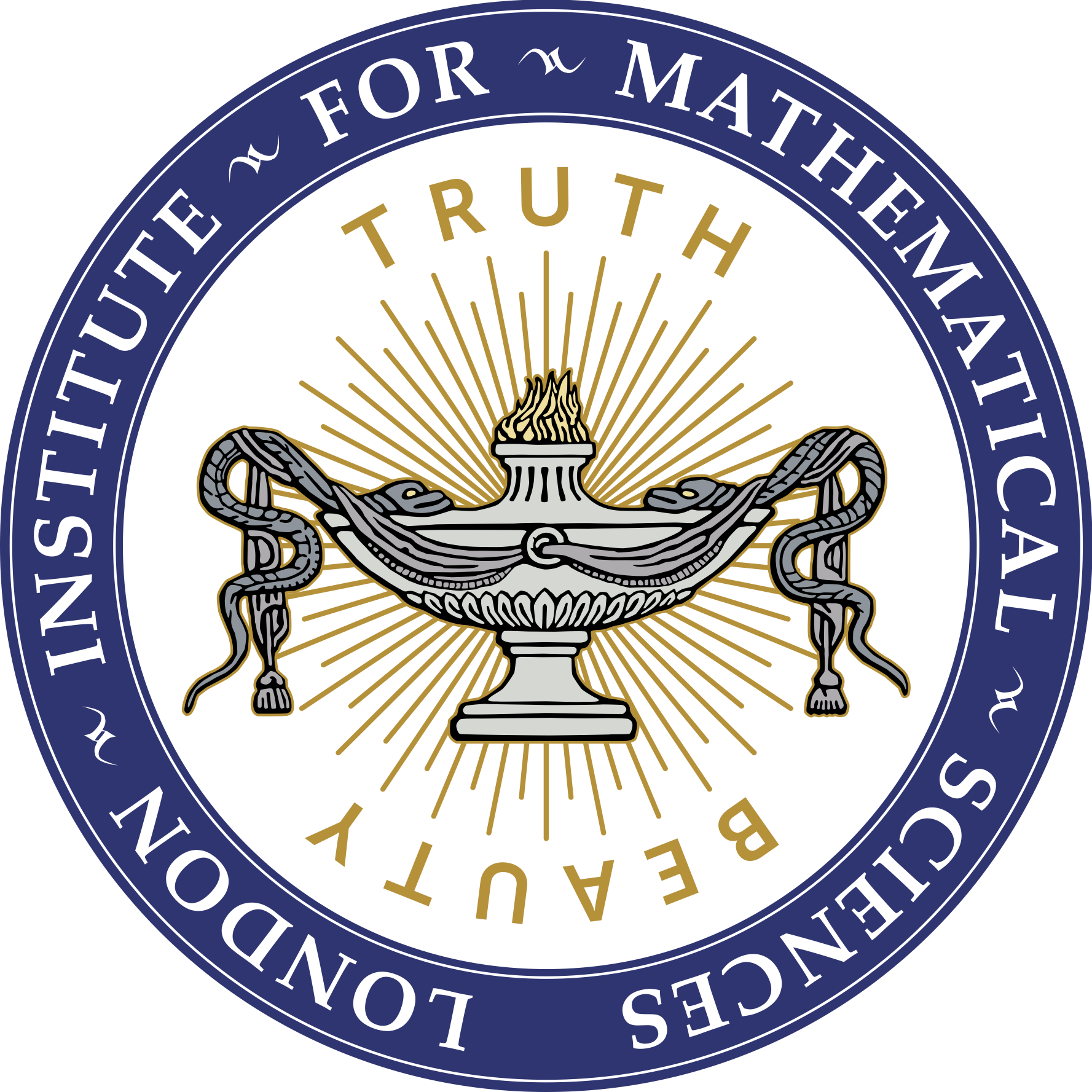

The London Institute for Mathematical Sciences (LIMS, also known as the London Institute) is Britain's only independent research centre in theoretical physics and mathematics. The institute was established as a research-only environment, distinct from the teaching-and-research model of universities, with the aim of allowing scientists to spend their time on research rather than teaching and administration.

In 2026, it was reported the entrepreneur and philanthropist Ben Delo had pledged £20 million to LIMS as part of a campaign to build a £60 million endowment.

== History ==
The London Institute was founded in 2011 by the American physicist Thomas Fink with the encouragement of Caltech's Head of Physics, Tom Tombrello. It received early grants from DARPA and the EU’s research framework programme.

In 2019, it was awarded Independent Research Organisation status by UK Research and Innovation, becoming the first independent research centre in the physical sciences to be allowed to compete with universities for funding from the seven research councils. In an article in Times Higher Education, Thomas Fink described the decision as part of a wider discussion about whether more research should be conducted outside universities.

In 2021, its researchers moved into the Royal Institution at 21 Albemarle Street in Mayfair. They now occupy rooms that were once the private living quarters of Sir Humphry Davy, Michael Faraday and Sir William Bragg, among others.

After Russia invaded Ukraine in February 2022, LIMS created the Arnold and Landau Fellowships, named after the Ukrainian mathematician Vladimir Arnold and the Russian physicist Lev Landau, consisting of ten three-year full-time positions.

Theoretical physicist Chris Hull joined the institute in 2026.

== Research ==
The London Institute conducts research in mathematics, theoretical physics and related mathematical sciences. Its research pages group the institute's work into four broad themes: "Mathematics that unifies", "The elegant universe", "Life, learning and emergence" and "AI-assisted discovery".

Its researchers have published papers on statistical physics in Nature Reviews Physics; algebraic geometry in the Journal of High Energy Physics; graph theory in the European Journal of Combinatorics; and network theory in Physical Review Letters. In 2024, researcher Oleksandr Gamayun’s paper on topological solitons became LIMS's first to be published in Nature.

In 2021, the UK government announced the launch of Advanced Research and Invention Agency (ARIA), a new science agency designed to support projects that may create "a paradigm shift in science". Following the agency's creation, LIMS compiled a list of the 23 Mathematical Challenges of our time, inspired by David Hilbert's list of 23 challenges published in 1900, 17 of which have been solved or partially resolved; the LIMS list was published in full in The Times.

A prominent part of the institute’s programme concerns AI-assisted mathematical discovery. Yang-Hui He and collaborators have worked on the use of machine learning to detect mathematical structures in fields such as algebraic geometry, string theory and number theory, where they have reported work on “murmurations” of elliptic curves: oscillating patterns observed in averages of Frobenius traces over elliptic curves grouped by conductor and rank. The work appeared in Experimental Mathematics and was covered by Quanta Magazine.

More broadly, its AI-related research includes both the use of machine learning as a tool for mathematics and theoretical physics, and foundational work on machine learning itself, including reasoning in neural networks, attention mechanisms and memory-augmented models.

== Leadership and governance ==
The director of LIMS is the physicist Thomas Fink. Its trustees include Martin Reeves, chairman of the BCG Henderson Institute; the actress and author Talulah Riley; the investor Florian Schuster; and the entrepreneur and philanthropist Ben Delo. In addition to its trustees, it has a group of governors, who include Amit Jain and Pinar Emirdağ.

== Funding ==
LIMS has funded its physics research almost entirely though philanthropy, corporate sponsorship and EU and US grants, rather than through access to a dedicated stream of domestic core public funding.

As a non-university institute, the LIMS does not receive student fees or the annual core funding the British government gives to universities. Instead it has been funded by research grants from the EU's Horizon 2020, the European Innovation Council, DARPA, the US Department of Defense, the Ministry of Defence, the Medical Research Council and Cancer Research UK. Industry collaborations include investments from firms in strategy, biotech and AI.

The Khodorkovsky Foundation became a significant supporter of the institute after the Russian invasion of Ukraine, helping to fund the Arnold and Landau Fellowships. Civil Society reported that the Khodorkovsky Foundation had donated £450,000 to LIMS in 2024, matching its donation in the previous year.

In 2025, Delo funded the Ben Delo Fellowship at the London Institute, whose first incumbent is the physicist Juven Wang. In 2026, Delo pledged an additional £20 million to LIMS. The pledge was one of the largest private gifts to a non-Oxbridge research institution in the United Kingdom, according to Times Higher Education. The same report stated that the gift would support a campaign to raise a £60 million endowment, and that Delo was attracted by the institute’s research-only model. Civil Society reported that LIMS’ recorded expenditure of £2.26 million and income of £907,000 in 2024.

== Public engagement and events ==
LIMS is based inside the Royal Institution, whose lecture theatre has a long history of public scientific communication, including the Royal Institution Christmas Lectures and Friday Evening Discourses. The institute has used the Royal Institution setting for public and semi-public events, interviews, lectures and discussions.

Events associated with the institute have included conversations with scientists and writers, research talks and public lectures. In 2021, Thomas Fink and Yang-Hui He interviewed the physicist Roger Penrose in the Royal Institution theatre. In 2023, He delivered a Royal Institution Friday Evening Discourse on non-Euclidean geometry and modern physics. LIMS has also listed events involving figures such as Edward Frenkel, Stephen Wolfram and Neil Turok, with some interviews and colloquia posted on the London Institute YouTube channel.

== See also ==
- Perimeter Institute for Theoretical Physics
- Institute for Advanced Study
- Simons Laufer Mathematical Sciences Institute
- Royal Institution
