= Roubini Global Economics =

UK finance firm

- Company type: Private
- Founded: 2004
- Dissolved: 2016
- Headquarters: London, {{{location_country}}}
- No. of locations: 3
- Area served: Global
- Founders: Nouriel Roubini and Camille LeBlanc
- Industry: Finance, economics
- Products: Macroeconomic analysis, research

Roubini Global Economics (RGE), formerly RGE Monitor, was a small economic consultancy for financial analysis.

== History ==
Roubini Global Economics was founded in 2004 by Nouriel Roubini, former senior adviser for one year in the U.S. Treasury and briefly to the International Monetary Fund and a professor at New York University's Stern School of Business, and Camille LeBlanc, a serial entrepreneur in the digital media sector. The company re-branded itself as Roubini Global Economics in 2010.

As of 2011, the firm was not profitable. Roubini said: "The most important thing in this kind of business is that you have to be right day in and day out. The fact that I made a right call a few years ago doesn’t matter." In July 2012, RGE announced that it had acquired Country Insights.

Roubini closed the firm in 2016.
