= Arthur Hayes (banker) =

American banker and entrepreneur

- Born: 1985 (age 40–41); Detroit, Michigan, U.S.
- Education: University of Pennsylvania (BS)
- Known for: Co-founding BitMEX

Arthur Hayes (born 1985) is an American businessman and derivatives trader who co-founded cryptocurrency exchange BitMEX. In 2022, he pleaded guilty to a violation of the Bank Secrecy Act and was sentenced to six months of home detention, two years of probation, and a $10 million fine; in 2025, he was pardoned by President Donald Trump.

== Early life and education ==
Hayes was born in 1985 in Detroit, Michigan, to middle-class parents employed by General Motors, and the family later moved to Buffalo, New York. He attended the Nichols School, a private preparatory school in Buffalo, where he played varsity tennis and cross-country and graduated in 2004. Hayes then studied at the Wharton School of the University of Pennsylvania, graduating in 2008 with a Bachelor of Science in economics. He later lived in Singapore.

== Career ==
=== Deutsche Bank and Citigroup ===
Hayes moved to Hong Kong in 2008, to start his investment banking career. He worked for Deutsche Bank, from 2008-11 as an equity derivatives trader, and for Citigroup for two years. He worked as the head ETF market maker for both firms. In 2011, Hayes left Deutsche Bank, and began working as a Delta one trader for Citibank in Hong Kong. In 2013, he was laid off.

=== BitMEX ===
Hayes co-founded cryptocurrency exchange BitMEX in 2014 at 28 years of age with Ben Delo and Samuel Reed. It became one of the world's largest virtual currency derivatives exchanges. In 2021, its average daily trading volume was over $2 billion.

In March 2019, Hayes made a $2.24 million charitable contribution to the Jackie Robinson Foundation (JRF) Scholars program, the largest-ever gift donated by an alumnus of its college scholars program. In April 2020 he announced that BitMex's operator was donating $2.5 million to four organizations working to fight the coronavirus pandemic.

==== Bank Secrecy Act violation ====
In October 2020, Hayes and his partners were each indicted by the U.S. Department of Justice. The charges by the DOJ in the case (United States vs Hayes et al) claimed that Hayes and partners did not register the company in the United States, and that they had 'thousands of US based customers'. The CFTC charged that the illegal operations enabled money laundering activity under the Bank Secrecy Act. BitMEX was the first crypto exchange to be charged under the Bank Secrecy Act. The laws require that transactions that are over $10,000 be reported. It is known as Know Your Customer (KYC) information.

Hayes stepped down from BitMex in October 2020. Alexander Hoptner replaced Hayes as CEO of BitMEX.

In April 2021, Hayes surrendered to United States authorities in Hawaii, and was released on bail. According to an article published in the Financial Insight Zambia Limited, on February 9, 2021, in their opinion Hayes' crime was that he refused to allow the CFTC to obtain the account information on Bitmex's customers. United States citizens used Virtual Private Network (VPN accounts) to set up BitMex accounts. Because the BitMEX platform was not registered in the U.S. or the Canadian province of Quebec their citizens were prohibited from using the platform. Citizens were able to mask their locations by using VPN networks. An article published in the Wall Street Journal on August 10, 2021, said that a settlement had been reached between BitMEX and the CFTC. BitMEX agreed to pay a $100 million fine to resolve the issue, without admitting or denying the charges.

On February 24, 2022, Hayes, along with co-founders Benjamin Delo and Samuel Reed, and Gregory Dwyer pleaded guilty to "willfully failing to establish, implement, and maintain an anti–money laundering (“AML”) program at BitMEX." Because Hayes was a first-time offender with a lengthy track record of charitable work, the Probation Department recommended a sentence of two years probation without any incarceration. Hayes was sentenced to six months of home confinement with two years probation; he also agreed to pay a $10 million dollar fine representing his pecuniary gain from the offense.

On 29 March 2025, Hayes and his co-founders received a pardon from President Donald Trump.

== See also ==
- List of people granted executive clemency in the second Trump presidency
