= Level playing field =

Ensuring fairness

A level playing field is a concept about fairness, not that each person has an equal chance to succeed, but that they all play by the same set of rules resulting in formal equality of opportunity.

In a game played on a playing field, such as rugby, one team would have an unfair advantage if the field had a slope. Since some real-life playing fields do in fact have slopes, it is customary for teams to swap ends of the playing field at half time.

A metaphorical playing field is said to be level if no external interference affects the ability of the players to compete fairly.

Some government regulations are intended to provide such fairness, since all participants must abide by the same rules. However, they can have the opposite effect, for example if larger firms find it easier to pay for fixed costs of regulation. It may be added that if the rules affect different participants differently, then they are not actually the same.

Handicapping might be thought of as the opposite concept, of unequal rules designed to make the outcome of play more equal.

== Examples ==
Governments, regulators and sports associations may try to create a 'level playing field'.

Examples of such regulation: building codes, material specifications and zoning restrictions, which create a starting point / a minimum standard --- a "level playing field".

=== Education ===
- Students from low-income families can be considered for a scholarship so they are able to study at a university. (opposite of a handicap; see below)

=== Web 2.0 ===
- In the past, being a published author was easier for select few, due to barriers to entry. With the advent of worldwide internet connectivity, it is now easier for many people to publish their writing, through websites, wikis such as Wikipedia, and self-publishing platforms.

=== Automobile Industry ===
- Manufacturers must prove that each car being offered is "safe" to drive.

=== Sports ===
- Each team is allowed to field the same number of players as the opposing team.
- Formula 1 cars and their drivers all have been submitted to the same set of rules before participating in a race. Even the combination of the weight of the car and driver has been corrected and made equal in relationship to their opponents.

== Subjectivity ==
What is meant to "level the playing field" can be subjective, for example when a regulation does not change the probability distribution of outcomes. For example, the fact that all companies are required to pay the same rate of corporate income tax could be described as "creating a level playing field", while some may say that this does not level the playing field, because while the requirements are equal for all companies, larger companies may have more resources from which to pay the tax.

=== Examples ===
- Describing different rules for different people as a "level playing field":
  - "Sainsbury's chief executive Justin King has attacked the government for creating an unfair burden on high-street retailers by not doing more to tax online-only rivals such as Amazon. He called for a level playing field and said politicians should take action or risk seeing the high street shrink further. King said: 'The burden of taxation in the UK falls very heavily on bricks-and-mortar retailers versus internet only retailers.'"

== See also ==
- Free trade
- Fair trade
- Equal opportunity
- Referee
