= Ike Behar =

American clothing brand

- Industry: clothing
- Founded: New York City, USA 1960
- Headquarters: New York
- Area served: United States; Mexico; Peru; Canada; Italy
- Website: www.ikebehar.com

Ike Behar is a clothing brand of American heritage launched in New York in the 1960s by Cuban-American Isaac Behar. Still family-owned, the company is known for making dress shirts, neckties, and jackets in the USA as well as in Mexico, Peru, Canada and Italy. From 1970 until 1982, Ike Behar made shirts in the USA for Ralph Lauren's budding business. Presently, Behar's three sons run the company.

== Philanthropy ==
Ike Behar is a long-time supporter of the Latin Auxiliary of Douglas Gardens. The Latin Auxiliary of Douglas Gardens is a group of community members who support programs at Miami Jewish Health Systems, a non-profit Miami healthcare organization which Behar finds dear to him, as his MJHS support started when his mother-in-law became sick and benefited from the organization. His active participation in the Latin Auxiliary includes helping to fund programs at Miami Jewish Health systems such as the music therapy Program. The program helps promote the health and well-being of the organization's nursing home residents, through using donations to help afford a full-time board certified music therapist, musical instruments, a wide range of music media and recordings, support equipment and resources.

Ike Behar was awarded the Latin Auxiliary's Lifetime Achievement Award as a result of his humanitarian efforts with the organization on June 17, 2010.
