= Clip-on =

Clip-on may refer to:

- Clip-on tie, a bow tie or necktie that is fixed to the front of the shirt collar by a metal clip
- Clip-on lens, a dark sunglasses lens that can be clipped onto corrective eyewear
- Clip-on, a type of motorcycle handlebar
