= Tie press =

Device used to flatten neckties

A tie press is a device, based solely on pressure, to flatten neckties. Its use is necessitated by ties usually being of silk or some other textile ill-suited to the heat of ironing.

Tie presses usually operate based on two separate wooden boards which are clamped together with spring-loaded levers. A cardboard cut-out is usually included to retain the shape of the tie during pressing.

Tie presses are particularly useful for bow ties, due to the creasing and thus deformative nature of the bow tie knot, which involves crushing the ends to produce the 'bow' effect. In time, this crushing affects the appearance of the finished knot. This is particularly the case with bow ties with rectangular ends, rather than the 'bow' shaped ends in some bow ties, though both suffer from crushing to some degree or another. Four-in-hand ties, naturally, are also creased, but rarely to the same extent and, as such, usually require less regular pressing.
