= Tie clip =

Clothing accessory

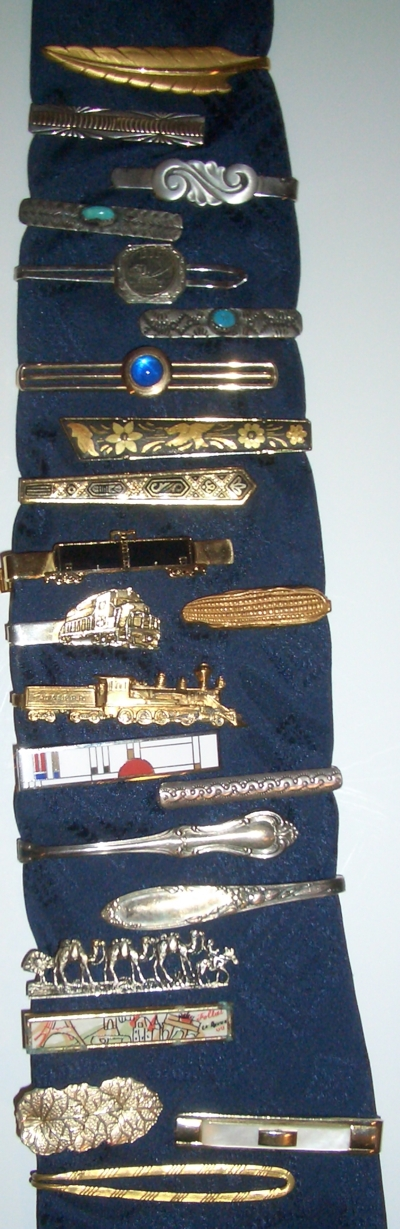
A selection of tie clips, mostly from the early to mid 20th century

A tie clip (also tie slide, tie bar, or tie clasp) is a clothing accessory that is used to clip a tie to the underlying shirt front, preventing it from swinging and ensuring that the tie hangs straight, resulting in a neat, uniform appearance.

The use of tie clips gained prominence during the 1920s, during which period the use of straight ties made of delicate materials such as silk became more fashionable, and they largely came to replace the more traditional tie pin.

Tie clips are commonly made of metal and often have decorative patterns or embellishments. Some clips have a small badge indicating membership to a club or some other affiliation, or some other commemorative token, in a similar manner to the way in which ties themselves may be used as signs of membership.

In the United States, a tie clip is one of the few items of jewelry allowed to be worn by servicemen and women.

== See also ==
- Clip-on tie
- Collar pin
- Tie chain
- Tie pin
