= Tie chain =

Item for securing neckwear

A silver tie chain

A tie chain is a neckwear-controlling device.

Similar to tie clips and tie bars, it is used to hold in place a tie to the underlying shirt front, ensuring that the tie hangs straight. This accessory is composed of two parts, a durable clip and a chain (typically of gold or silver). The clip attaches to a button or attaches to the placket on the shirt and when properly worn is covered entirely by the tie. The chain is then left to rest across the necktie, keeping the tie secure.
