= Jesse Langsdorf =

Creator of modern necktie (1879-1943)

- Born: Jesse Emil Langsdorf; May 1, 1879
- Died: March 22, 1943 (aged 63); Manhattan, New York
- Occupation: Tailor
- Known for: Creating modern necktie

Jesse Langsdorf (May 1, 1879 – March 22, 1943) was an American tailor, best known for creating the modern necktie.

== Career ==
On April 12, 1922, Langsdorf filed for a patent on his new approach to cutting neckties that would support the already dominant four-in-hand knot. By introducing cuts on the bias, as opposed to the grain, and a ladder stitch connecting the fabric ends, Langsdorf's design prevented bunching. On February 27, 1923, the US Patent and Trademark Office granted the application as Patent No. 1,447,090. While ties were first introduced to formal men's attire through Croatian mercenaries' cravats in the 1660s, Langsdorf's design remains the dominant approach to manufacturing neckties.

== Litigation ==
Langsdorf assigned the patent to Franc-Strohmenger & Cowan Inc., which vigorously litigated patent infringement claims in American and British courts between 1927 and 1931. In July 1927, the Sixth Circuit reasoned that because bias cuts and ladder stitches were already known among American tailors, Langsdorf was only spurred into this invention by recent improvements in fabric resiliency. Accordingly, it denied patent infringement claims on the basis that Langsdorf was not exhibiting creativity in making the obvious response to these developments.

The following year, the Second Circuit rejected an attempt to invalidate the patent on the basis that it relied on using a sufficiently resilient material without disclosing Langsdorf's trademarked "Resilio" fabric. The court held that tailors were not forced to independently invent such fabrics because such materials were widely available in the market. At the trial level, District Court Judge Thomas D. Thacher highlighted that Langsdorf's necktie sales rose from $400,000 in 1921 to $2,500,000 in 1926, which he ascribed to the novelty and usefulness of Langsdorf's invention.

In Amgen Inc v. Sanofi (2023), the pharmaceutical company Amgen unsuccessfully cited this Second Circuit decision to argue against the Federal Circuit's test for sufficiency of disclosure. Amgen's patents described two techniques for developing antibodies that bind the protein PCSK9 to prevent it from binding LDL receptors, which the company had used to identify 26 antibodies capable of this task. In a unanimous Supreme Court verdict, Amgen's patents were invalidated because they only described their trial-and-error technique in terms of the function of successful outputs, rather than the physical characteristics of such antibodies.

In April 1930, the Sixth Circuit held that despite Langsdorf's proof that the material of Resilio fabric was already known, the patent should still be invalidated because the invention heavily relied on tailors switching to this resilient material, rather than to a new technique. In this decision, the Sixth Circuit noted that the circuit split had been appealed to the Supreme Court, but that certiorari petition for review was ultimately denied.

In July 1930, Justice Frederic Maugham of the British High Court of Justice's Chancery Division dismissed a patent infringement claim against the British hosiery company Peter Robinson. Maugham invalidated Langsdorf's patent based on a prior art analysis that bias cuts, ladder stitches, and stretch-resistant fabrics were already well known among tailors.

== Personal life ==
On March 18, 1913, Langsdorf married Martha Clare Khan. Together, they had three daughters, Frances, Margaret, and Katherine. On September 23, 1937, one of Langsdorf's daughters, Frances, married Henry Greenebaum.
