= Clip-on tie =

Pre-tied necktie with a clip to hold it in place

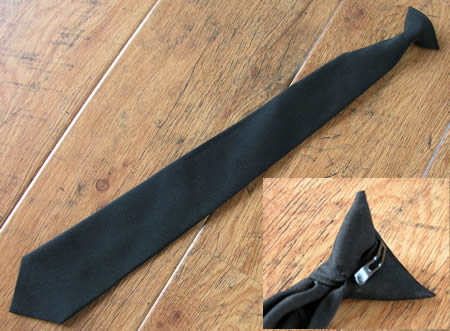
Clip-on tie. Inset: Metal clip used to fasten it onto the front of a shirt

A clip-on tie is a bow tie or necktie which is permanently tied, and worn by attaching it to the front of the shirt collar by a clip. Alternately, especially in the case of bow ties, the tie may have a band around the neck fastened with a hook and eye.

== Reasons for use ==
The following are some reasons that this style of tie may be used:

- Tightly tied standard neckties may be a source of irritation and discomfort.
- Some people, particularly children, do not know how to tie a standard necktie, or do not feel comfortable tying one.
- Some persons with disabilities may be physically incapable of tying a tie, or only capable of it with extreme difficulty.
- Police officers, prison officers, PCOs and security guards often wear clip-ons as a precaution against being strangled by a pulled necktie. (With uniform, a tie clip may be used to keep the tie from "flying" in the wind.)
- Schools may require clip-on ties instead of regular ties to increase uniformity and reduce staff time spent managing the dress code.
- A clip-on tie can be put on more quickly than a conventional necktie.
- A clip-on tie is used as a safety precaution in a manufacturing setting to avoid neck injury due to machine entanglement.

The clip-on tie was invented in Iowa in 1928 by Joseph W. Less to create safer neckties that people could wear at work.
