= Merovingian knot =

Necktie knot

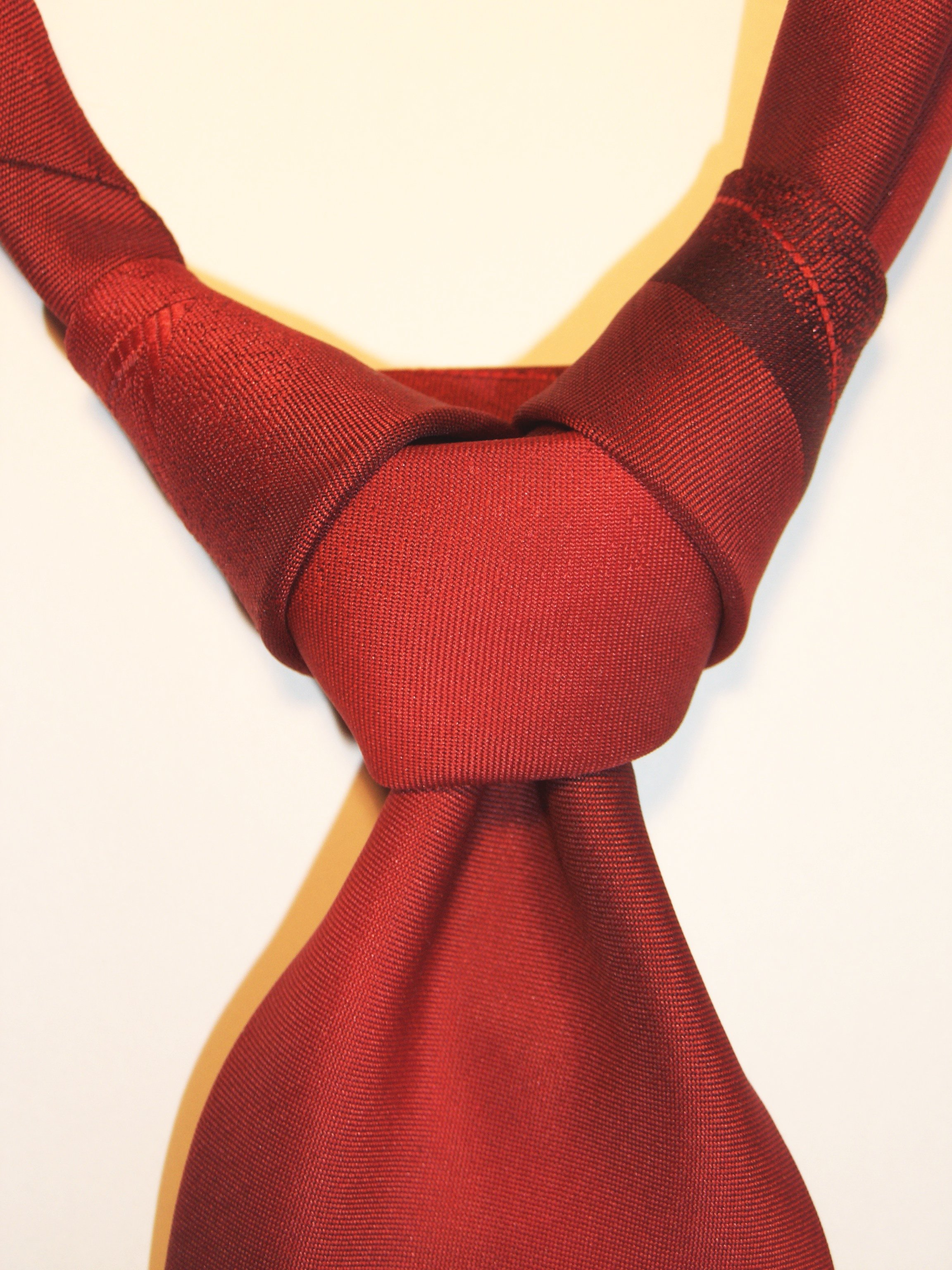
The Merovingian knot on a solid red necktie.

The Merovingian knot, or the Ediety knot, is a necktie knot characterized by its inverted structure and layered appearance. It gained popular recognition after being worn by the character known as the Merovingian in the film The Matrix Reloaded, part of The Matrix franchise. The knot is notable for its unconventional tying method, in which the narrow end of the tie is used to construct the knot rather than the wide end.

== History ==
The knot became more known following the 2003 release of The Matrix Reloaded, where it was worn by the character the Merovingian. Although sometimes described as a modern variation of the Windsor knot, the Merovingian knot is structurally distinct due to its reversed tying technique and its use of the narrow blade as the active end.

== Characteristics ==
The Merovingian knot is distinguished by:

1. An inside-out construction method
2. A narrow end that remains visible and wraps around the front
3. A layered, slightly asymmetrical appearance
4. A relatively small, compact knot size

== Tying method ==
To tie the Merovingian knot:

Drape the tie around the neck with the wide end shorter than the narrow end.

1. Cross the narrow end over the wide end.
2. Wrap the narrow end behind and through the neck loop.
3. Pass the narrow end across the front and up through the loop again.
4. Tuck the narrow end downward through the front horizontal band.
5. Adjust and tighten carefully to shape the knot.

Because the knot is tied with the narrow end, additional adjustment may be required to ensure the wide blade reaches the proper length.
