= Necktie =

Clothing item worn around the neck

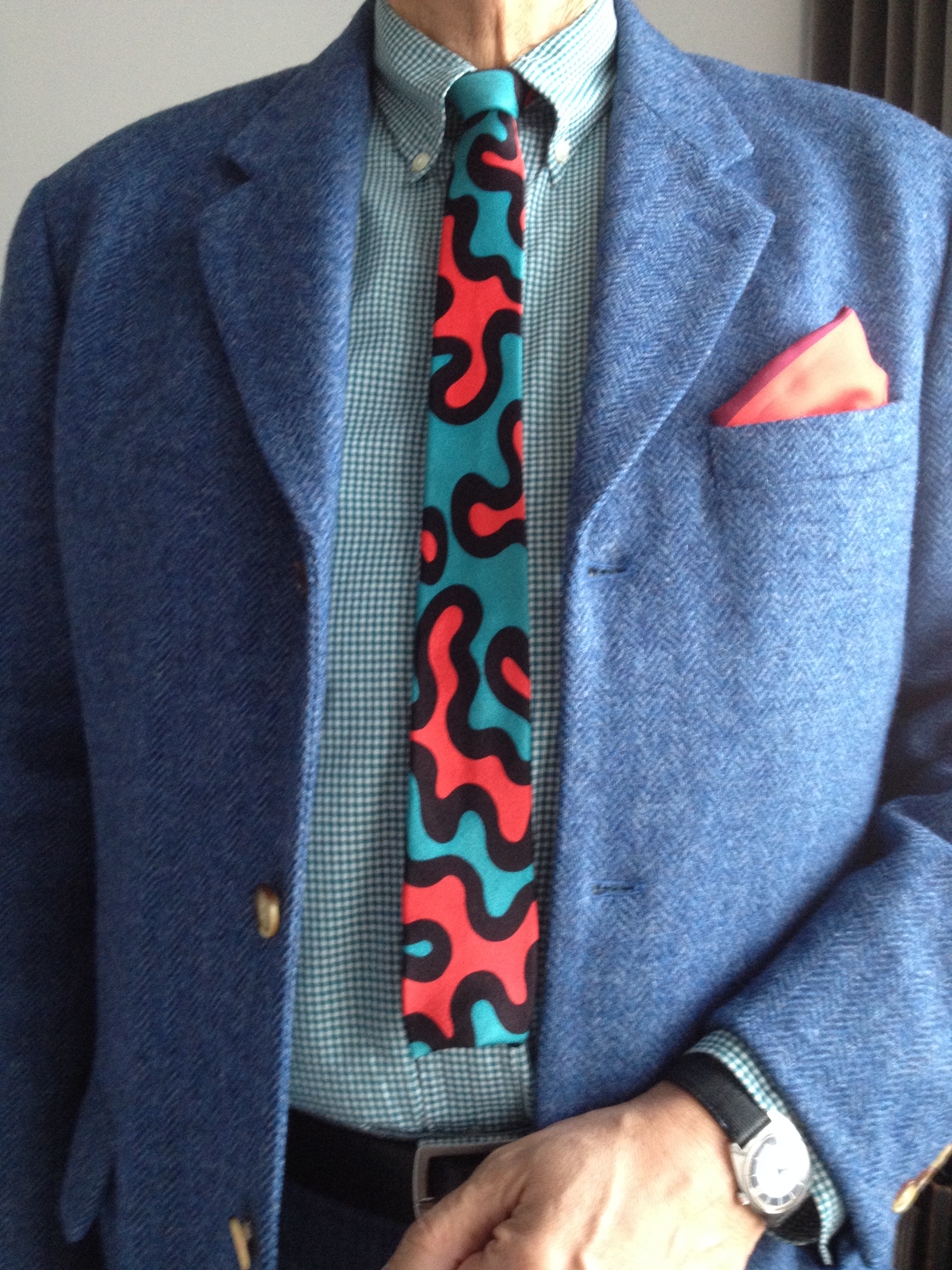
A man wearing a colorful necktie

A necktie (American English) – also called a long tie or, more usually, simply a tie (Commonwealth English) – is a cloth article of formal neckwear or office attire worn for decorative or symbolic purposes, knotted at the throat, resting under a folded shirt collar, and usually draped down the chest. On rare occasions, neckties are worn above a winged shirt collar. Neckties are usually paired with collared dress shirts under suit jackets or blazers, but have often been seen with other articles, such as sport coats and v-neck sweaters. Neckties can also be part of a uniform; however, in occupations where manual labor is involved, the end of the necktie is often tucked into the button line front placket of a dress shirt, such as the dress uniform of the United States Marine Corps.

Neckties are reported by fashion historians to be descended from the Regency era double-ended cravat. Adult neckties are generally unsized and tapered along the length, but may be available in longer sizes for taller people, designed to show just the wide end. Widths are usually matched to the width of a suit jacket lapel. Neckties are traditionally worn with the top shirt button fastened, and the tie knot resting between the collar points. Importance is given to the styling of the knot. In the late 1990s, Thomas Fink and Yong Mao of University of Cambridge mathematically determined 13 knots as "aesthetically" viable out of a possible total of 85, of which the commonest known are the four-in-hand, the Pratt, and the Windsor knots. The cut of the folded collar of the dress shirt is typically paired with the style of knot used. Neckties were originally considered menswear, but are now considered unisex items in most Western cultures.

Necktie is also US slang term for a hangman's noose.

== History ==
=== Origins ===
Jabot — a pleated, ruffled, or lace-trimmed frill worn over and down the front of a shirt

The necktie that spread from Europe traces back to Croatian mercenaries serving in France during the Thirty Years' War (1618–1648). These mercenaries from the Military Frontier, wearing their traditional small, knotted neckerchiefs, aroused the interest of the Parisians. Because of the difference between the Croatian word for Croats, Hrvati, and the French word, Croates, the garment gained the name cravat (cravate in French). Louis XIV began wearing a lace cravat around 1646 when he was seven and set the fashion for French nobility. From its introduction by the French king, men wore lace cravats and jabots — pleated, ruched, or frilled — which took a large amount of time and effort to arrange. This new article of clothing started a fashion craze in Europe; both men and women wore pieces of fabric around their necks. Jabots remain today as part of the dress code for legal practitioners in court and for formal academic wear. Cravats were often tied in place by cravat strings, arranged neatly and tied in a bow.

International Necktie Day is celebrated on October 18 in Croatia and in various cities around the world, including in Dublin, Tübingen, Como, Tokyo, Sydney, and other towns.

=== 1710–1800: stocks, solitaires, neckcloths, cravats ===
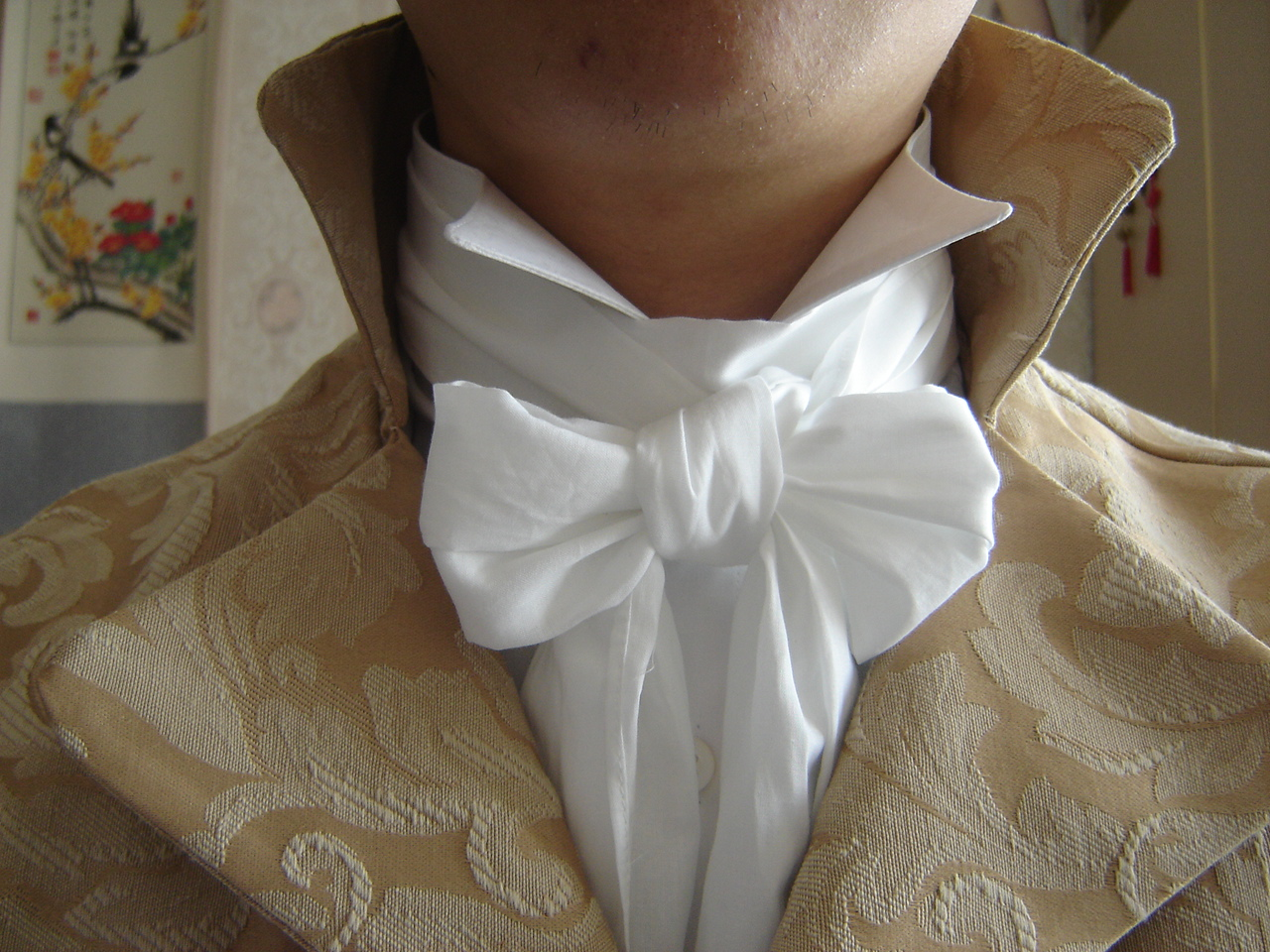
A Regency-style neckcloth tied in a bow on a Grafton collar

In 1715, another kind of neckwear, called "stocks" made its appearance. The term originally referred to a leather collar, laced at the back, worn by soldiers to encourage a military bearing and to keep the head high. The leather stock also afforded some protection to the major blood vessels of the neck from saber or bayonet attacks. General Sherman is seen wearing a leather stock in several American Civil War-era photographs.

Stock ties were initially just a small piece of muslin folded into a narrow band wound a few times around the shirt collar and secured from behind with a pin. At the time, it was fashionable for men to wear their hair long, past shoulder length, with the ends tucked into a black silk bag worn at the nape of the neck. This was known as the bag-wig hairstyle, and the neckwear worn with it was the stock. The solitaire was a variation of the bag wig, which had matching ribbons stitched around the bag. After the stock was in place, the ribbons would be brought forward and tied in a large bow in front of the wearer.

In the late 18th century, a resurgence in fashion for cravats began attributed to foppish young Englishmen who returned from the Grand Tour of Europe bringing with them new ideas about fashion from Italy, who were pejoratively called macaronis from their taste for pasta, then little known in Britain — as mentioned in the song "Yankee Doodle". The French contemporaries of these macaronis were termed the 'petits-maîtres' and incroyables.

=== 1800–1850: cravat, stocks, scarves, bandanas ===
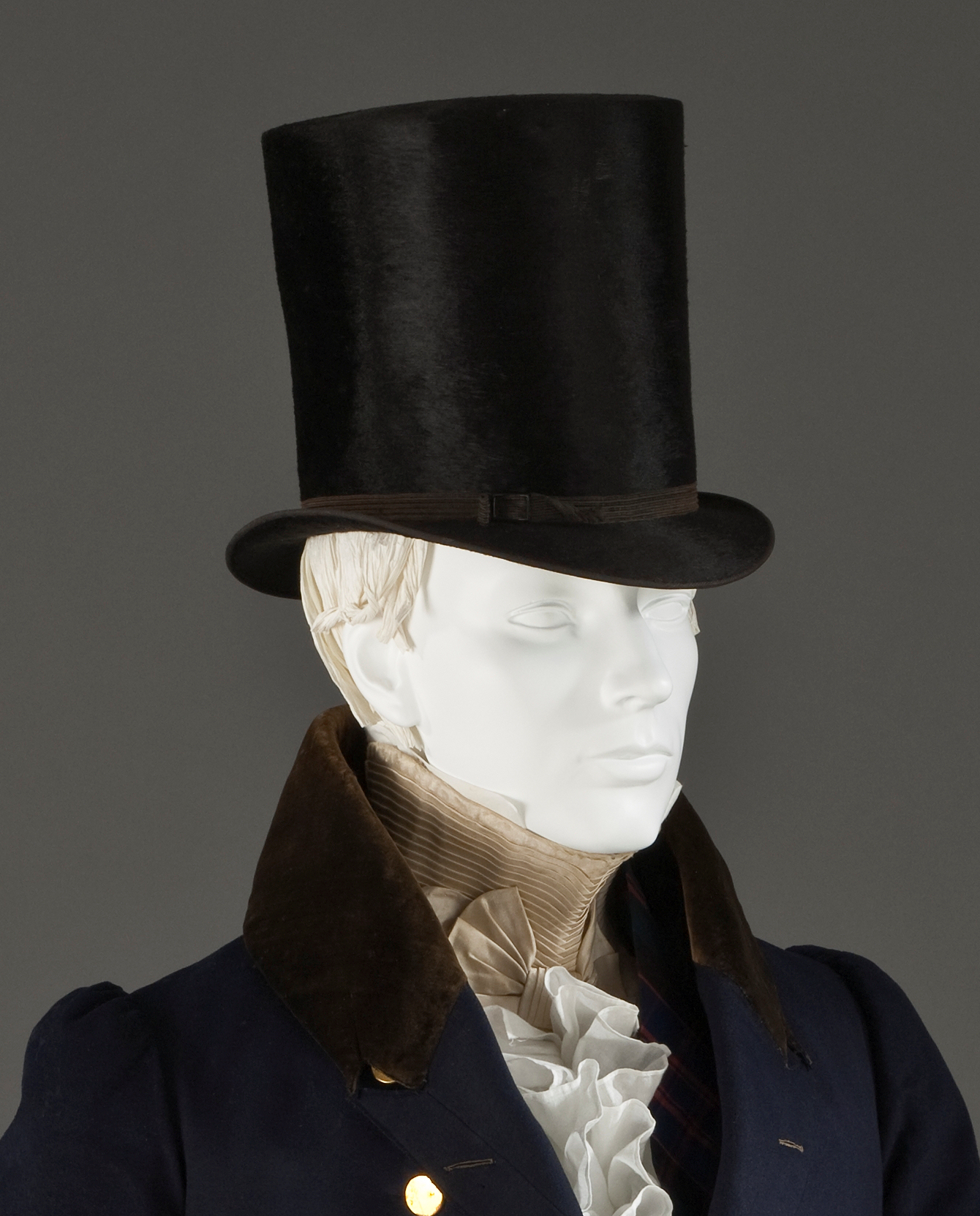
Pleated silk satin stock, Boston, c. 1830. Los Angeles County Museum of Art, AC1998.78.1

At this time, there was also much interest in how to tie a proper cravat, which led to a series of publications. This began in 1818 with the publication of Neckclothitania, a style manual that included illustrated instructions for tying 14 different cravats. Soon after, the immense skill required to tie the cravat in certain styles quickly became a mark of a man's elegance and wealth. It was also the first book to use the word tie in association with neckwear.

It was about this time that black stocks made their appearance. Their popularity eclipsed that of the white cravat, except in formal and evening wear. These remained popular through the 1850s. At this time, another form of neckwear worn was the scarf. This was where a neckerchief or bandana was held in place by slipping the ends through a finger or a scarf ring at the neck, rather than using a knot. This is the classic sailor neckwear and may have been adopted from them.

=== 1860s–1920s: bow ties, scarf/neckerchief, the ascot, the long tie ===
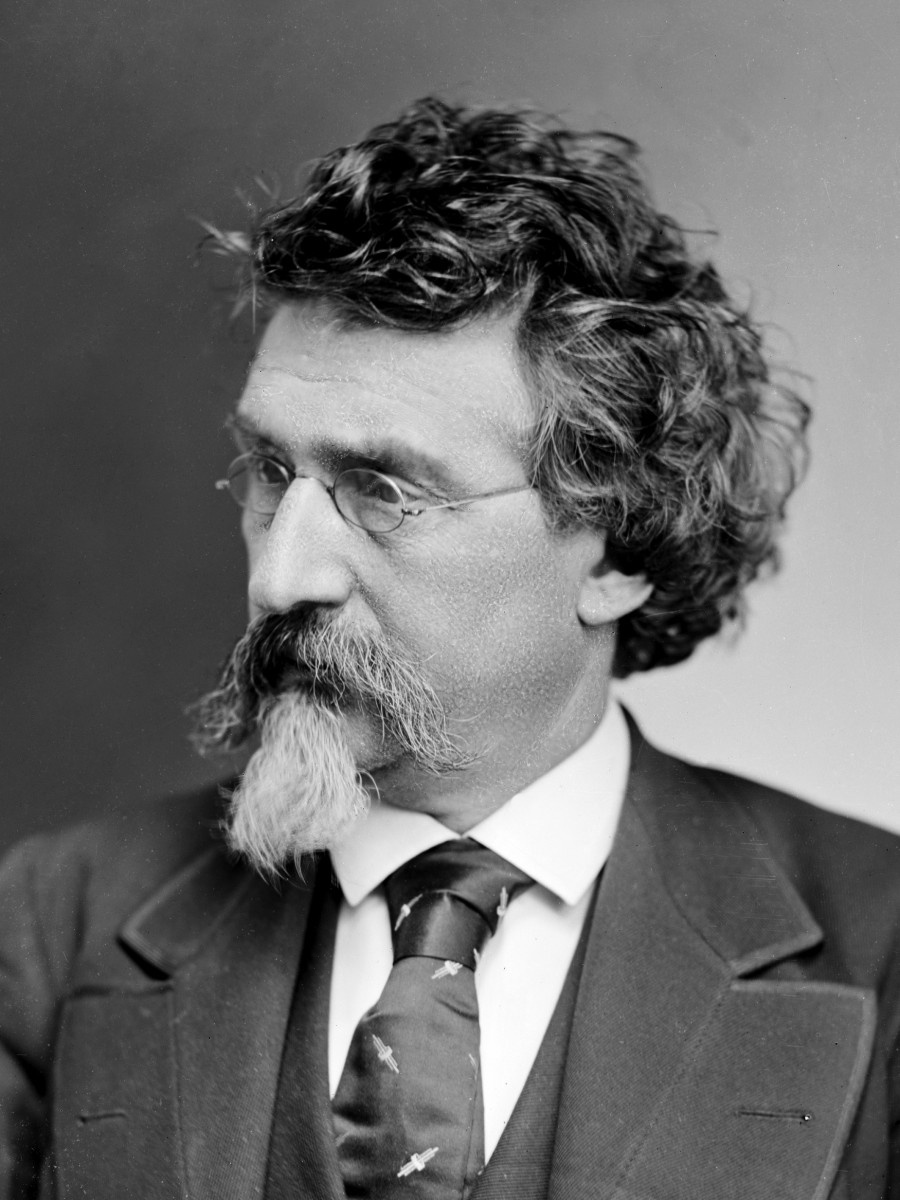
Mathew Brady wearing a tie in 1875

With the Industrial Revolution, more people wanted neckwear that was easy to put on, comfortable, and would last an entire workday. Long ties were designed to be long, thin, and easy to knot, without accidentally coming undone. Academic tailors Castell & Son (Oxford) Limited, which opened in 1846 in Oxford, takes credit for creating the first modern style necktie in 1870 — the original form of design still worn by millions.

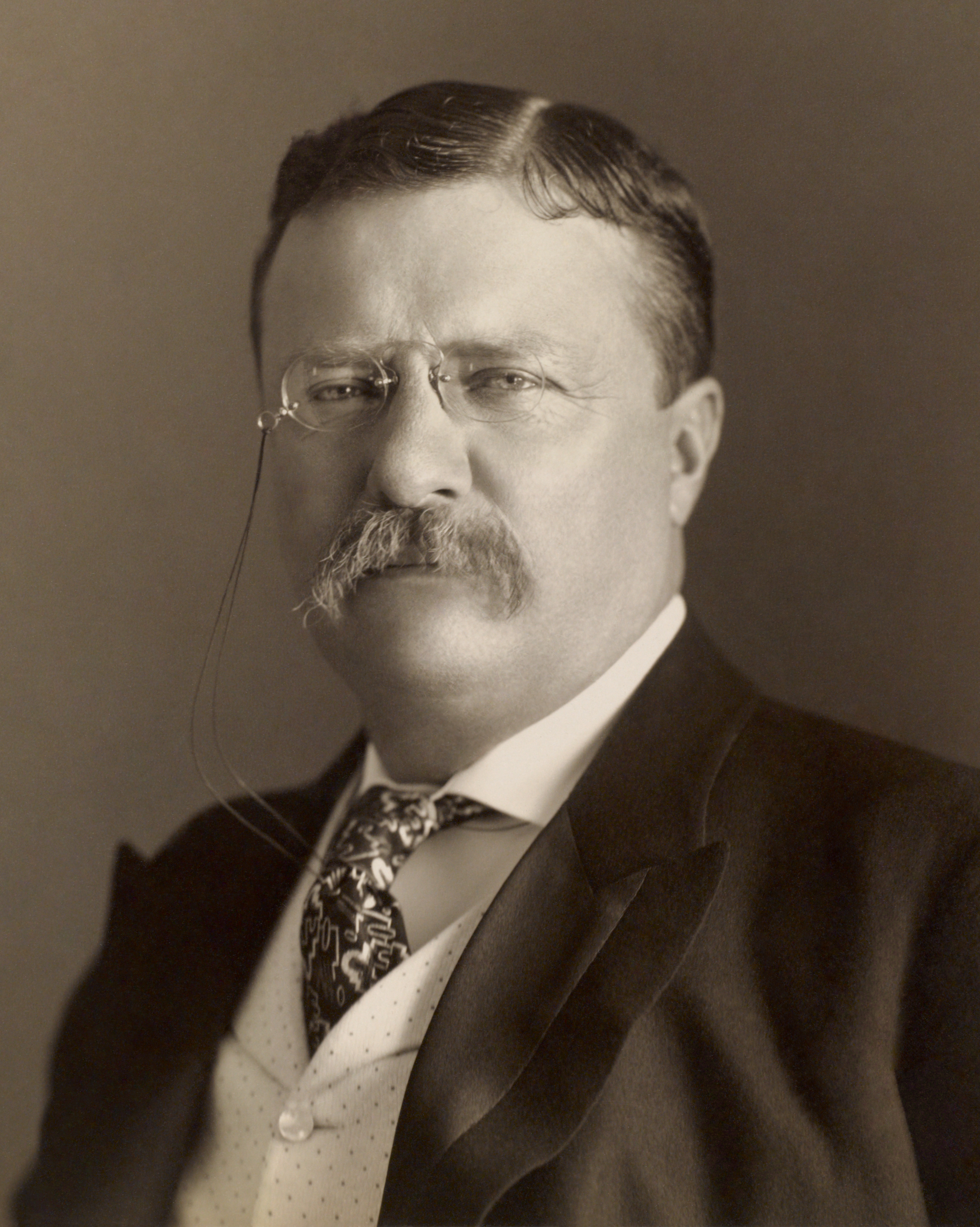
Theodore Roosevelt, the first US president to wear a long tie while in office.

In 1895, two years after his presidency ended, Benjamin Harrison became the first former US president portrayed wearing the modern long tie, and in 1903, Theodore Roosevelt became the first US president to wear the modern long tie in a presidential portrait while in office.

By this time, the sometimes complicated array of knots and styles of neckwear gave way to neckties and bow ties, the latter a much smaller, more convenient version of the cravat. Another type of neckwear, the ascot tie, was considered de rigueur for male guests at formal dinners and male spectators at races. These ascots had wide flaps that were crossed and pinned together on the chest.

=== 1920s–1945 ===
During the Interwar period, ties were typically worn shorter than they are today. This was due, in part, to men at that time more commonly wearing trousers with a higher rise (at the natural waist, just above the belly button) and waistcoats; i.e., ties could be shorter because trousers sat higher up and, at any rate, the tip of the tie was almost always concealed.

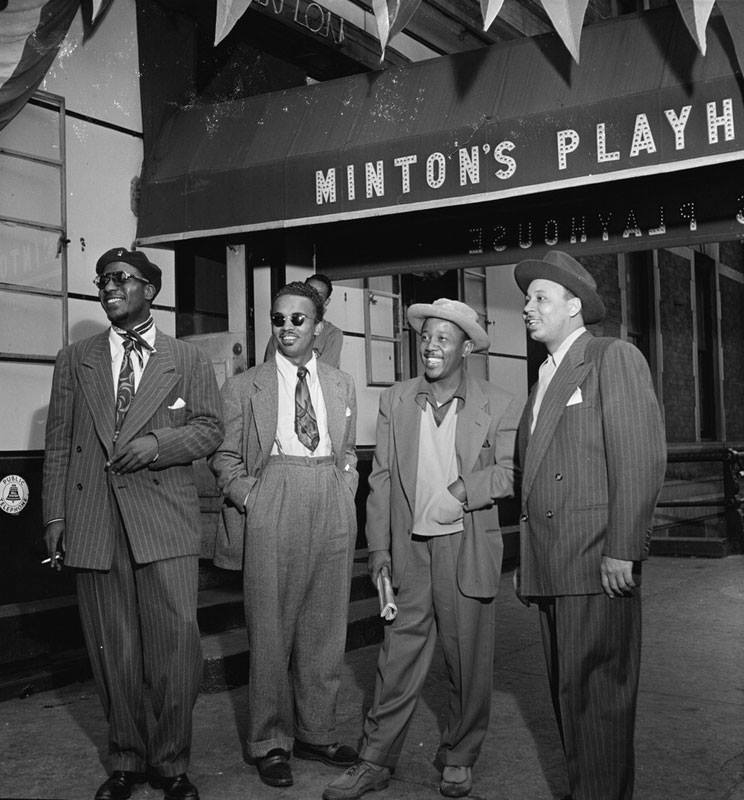
Jazz musicians Thelonious Monk, Howard McGhee, Roy Eldridge, and Teddy Hill, in front of Minton's Playhouse in New York City, wearing zoot suits with wide extravagant neckties in 1947

After the First World War, hand-painted ties became an accepted form of decoration in the US. The widths of some of these ties went up to 4 1/2 inches (11 cm). These loud, flamboyant ties – popularly paired with counter-culture over-sized zoot suits of hipsters in the jazz and bebop periods – and these sold very well through to the 1950s.

In 1922, a New York tie maker, Jesse Langsdorf, came up with a revolutionary method of cutting the fabric on the bias and sewing it in three segments. This technique greatly improved elasticity and facilitated the fabric's return to its original shape. It allowed the tie to evenly fall from the knot without twisting. Since then, the "Langsdorf" tie has been the standard due to its much easier care and neat tying. Yet another development during that time was the method used to secure the lining and interlining once the tie had been folded into shape.

=== 1945–1995 ===
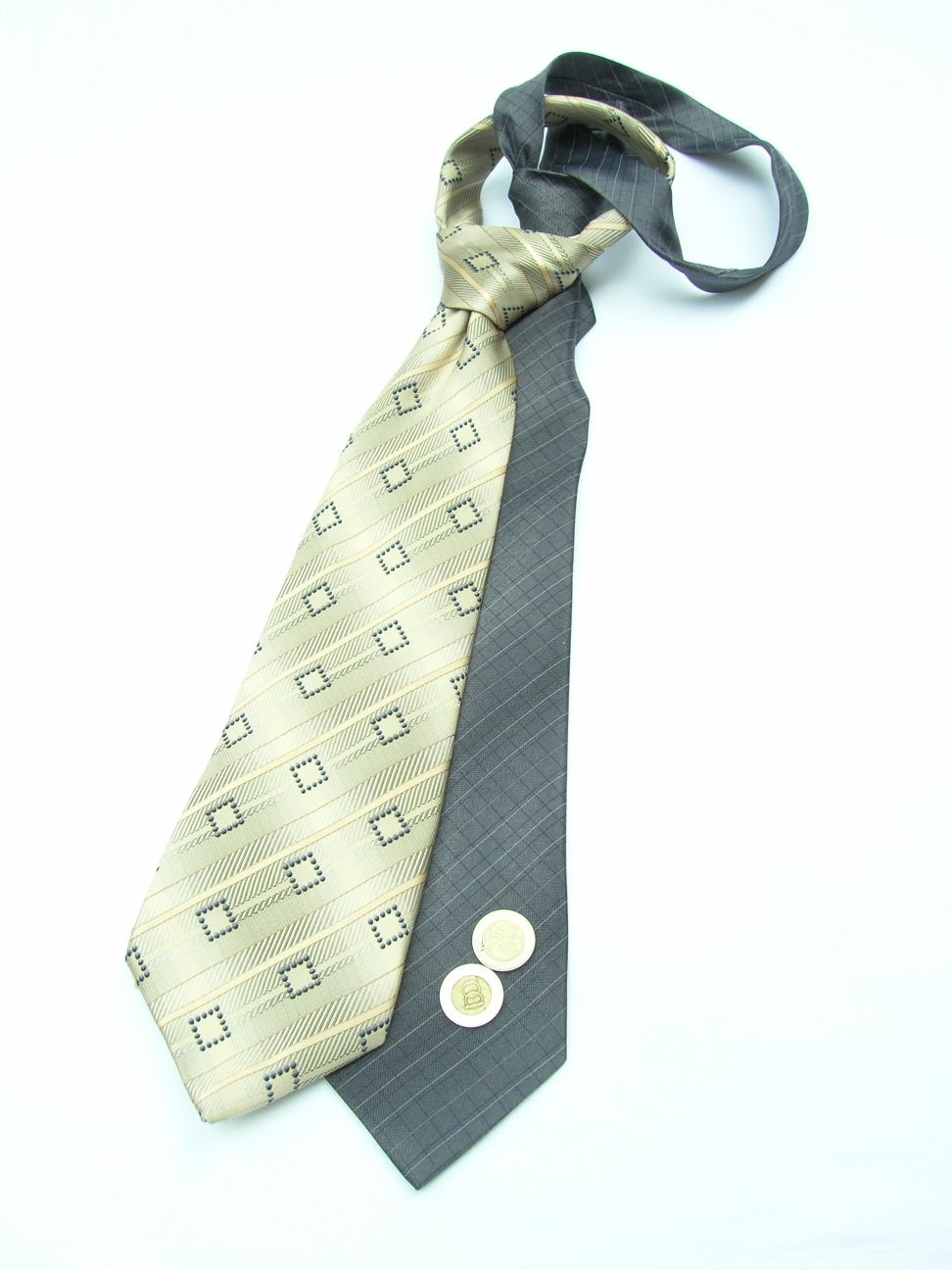
Two patterned neckties

Around 1944, ties started to become not only wider but even wilder. This was the beginning of what was later labeled the Bold Look: ties that reflected the returning GIs' desire to break with wartime uniformity. Widths reached 5 inches (13 cm), and designs included Art Deco, hunting scenes, scenic "photographs", tropical themes, and even girlie prints, though more traditional designs were also available. The typical length was 48 inches (120 cm).

The Bold Look lasted until about 1951 when the "Mister T" look (so termed by Esquire magazine) was introduced. The new style, characterized by tapered suits, slimmer lapels, and smaller hat brims, featured thinner ties that were not as wild. Tie widths were slimmed to 3 inches (7.6 cm) by 1953 and continued to get thinner until the mid-1960s; length increased to about 52 inches (130 cm) as men started wearing their trousers lower, closer to the hips. Through the 1950s, neckties remained somewhat colorful, yet more restrained than in the previous decade. Small geometric shapes were often employed against a solid background (i.e., foulards); diagonal stripes were also popular. By the early 1960s, dark, solid ties became very common, with widths slimming down to as little as 1 inch (2.5 cm).

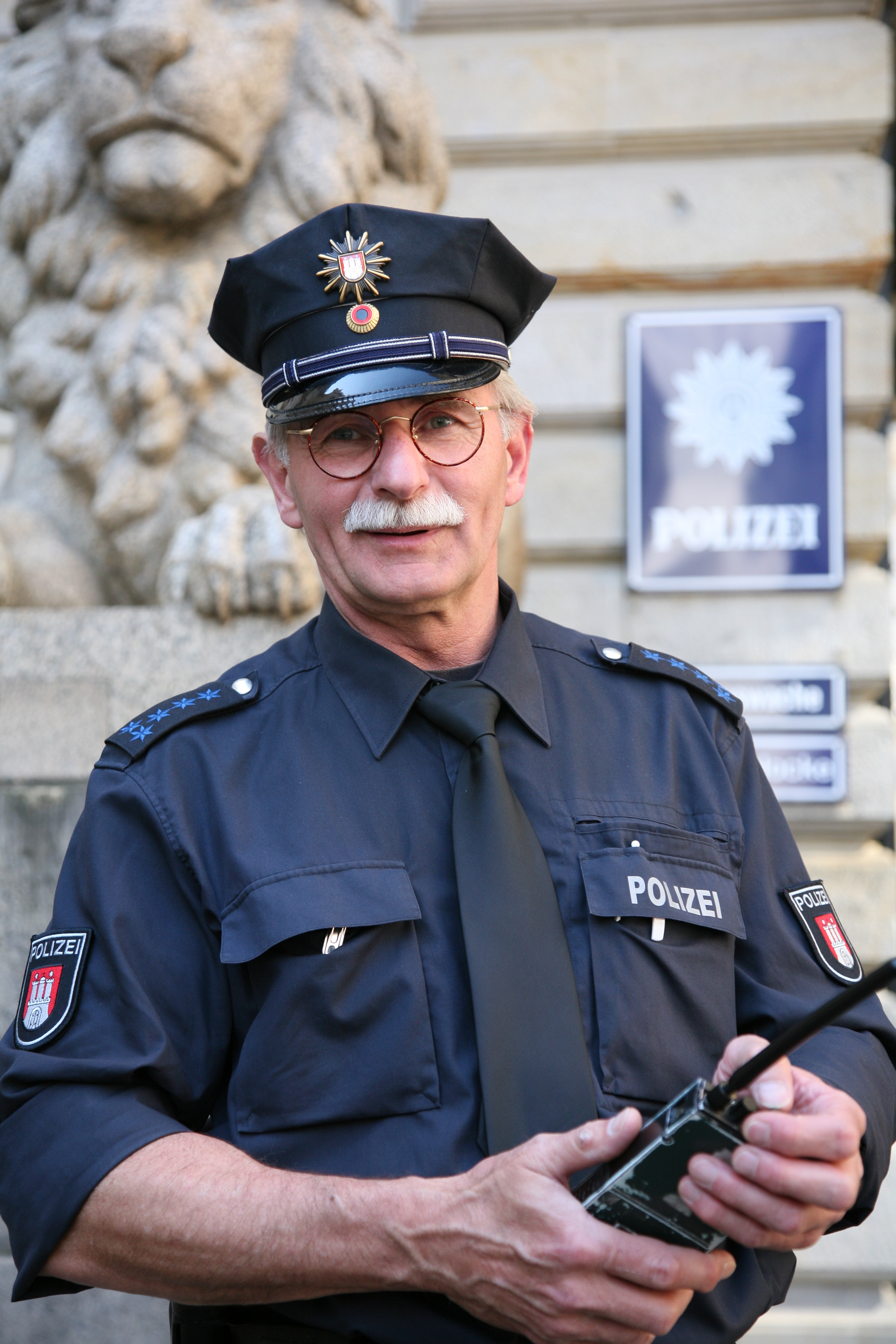
A policeman in Hamburg, Germany, wearing a necktie

The 1960s brought about an influx of pop art influenced designs. The first was designed by Michael Fish when he worked at Turnbull & Asser, and was introduced in Britain in 1965 — the term kipper tie was a pun on his name, as well as a reference to the triangular shape of the front of the tie. Ties became wider, returning to their 4 1/2-inch (11 cm) width, sometimes with garish colors and designs. The exuberance of the late 1960s and early 1970s gradually gave way to more restrained designs. The traditional designs of the 1930s and 1950s, such as those produced by Tootal, reappeared, particularly Paisley patterns. Ties began to be sold alongside shirts, and designers slowly began experimenting with bolder colors.

In the 1980s, narrower ties — some as narrow as 1 1/2 inches (3.8 cm), but more typically 3 to 3 1/4 inches (7.6 to 8.3 cm) wide — became popular again. Novelty (or joke) ties or deliberately kitschy ties designed to make a statement gained a certain popularity in the 1980s and 1990s. These included ties featuring cartoon characters, commercial products, or pop culture icons, as well as those made of unusual materials, such as leather, plastic, or even wood. Into the 1990s, as ties got wider again, increasingly unusual designs became common. During this period, with men wearing their trousers at their hips, ties lengthened to 57 inches (140 cm). The number of ties sold in the United States reached a peak of 110 million in the early 1990s.

=== 1995–present ===
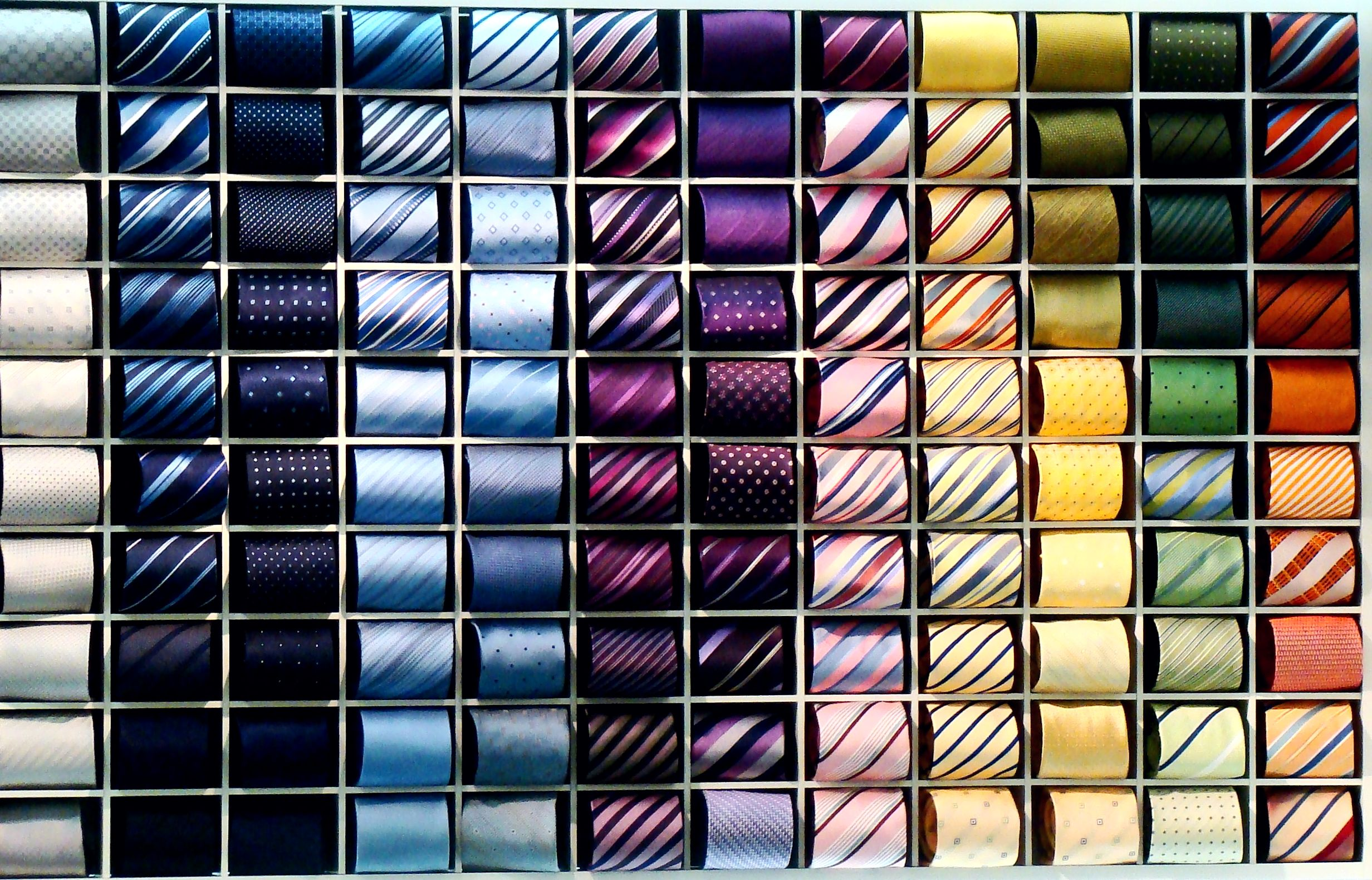
A collection of different colors of ties

During this period, the use of neckties in the workplace has declined gradually but significantly. By 2001 in the US, tie sales per year had almost halved to 60 million, from the early 1990s peak. Since then, the massive decline of being worn by men has continued, especially with most clubs, entertainment venues, and restaurants no longer requiring them to be worn for entry. It is no longer seen as a fashion staple in menswear and it is declining in formal wear as well. Conversely, the fashion for women wearing them has expanded, but this is still much lower than men's levels of wear. This fashion volte-face is seen as challenging the status quo and undermining the ideas of 'masculinity' and 'femininity' – drawing inspiration from Marlene Dietrich of the 1930s, via 70s Diane Keaton in Annie Hall, to kd lang of the 1990s – by the use of power dressing to give a different style of "armor".

At the start of the 21st century, the fashion for ties has widened to 3 1/2 to 3 3/4 inches (8.9 to 9.5 cm) wide, with a broad range of patterns available, from traditional stripes, foulards, and club ties (ties with a crest or design signifying a club, organization, or order) to abstract, themed, and humorous ones. The standard length remains 57 inches (140 cm), though other lengths vary from 46 to 60 inches (117 to 152 cm). While ties as wide as 3 3/4 inches (9.5 cm) are still available, ties under 3 inches (7.6 cm) wide also became popular, particularly with younger men and the fashion-conscious.

== Neckties as womenswear ==
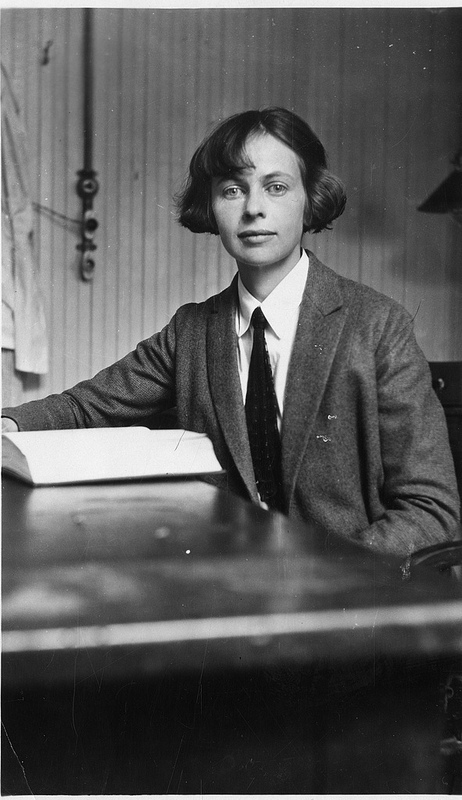
Biologist Gertrude Van Wagenen wearing a suit and tie

During the women's suffrage movement and women's liberation movement in the late 1800s, neckties were heavily adopted into women's fashion. Coco Chanel is often credited with advancing the acceptability of women wearing neckties in the 1930s. Still, a larger movement occurred during World War II, when women began working in factories and offices in large numbers.

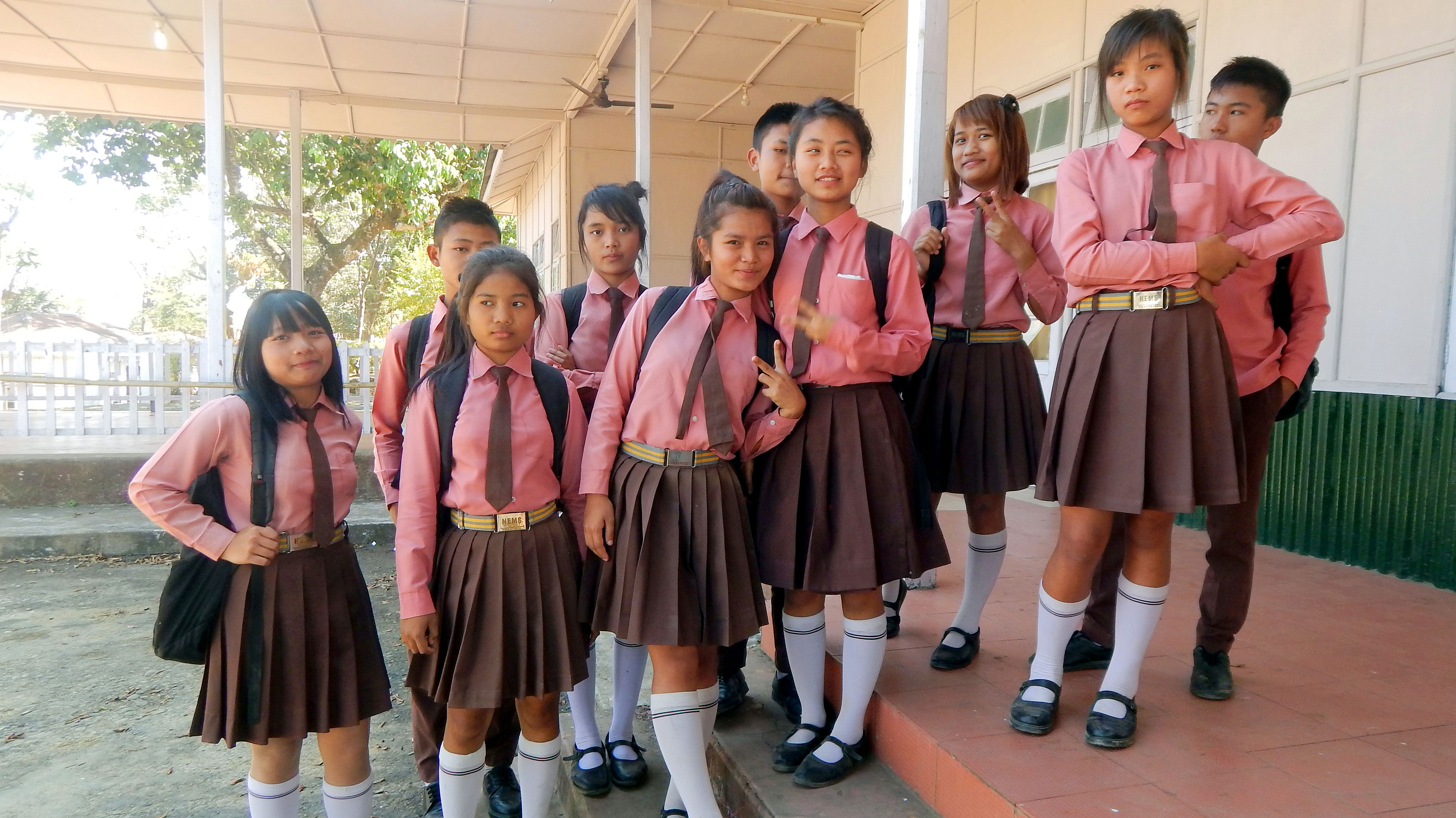
Ethnic Mizo schoolgirls in Mizoram, India wearing neckties as part of the school uniform

Neckties are sometimes part of uniforms worn by women, which nowadays may be required in professions such as the restaurant industry or police forces. In many countries, girls are now required to wear ties as part of primary and secondary school uniforms.

Women may also use ties as a fashion statement. During the late 1970s and 1980s, it was not uncommon for young women in the United States to wear ties as part of a casual outfit. This trend was popularized by Diane Keaton, who wore a tie as the titular character in the 1977 film Annie Hall.

In 1993, neckties reappeared as prominent fashion accessories for women in both Europe and the U.S. Canadian recording artist Avril Lavigne wore neckties with tank tops early in her career.

== Types ==
=== Modern cravat and Ascot tie ===
The modern cravat is slightly different from the popular cravats during the Regency era.

=== Four-in-hand ===
The four-in-hand necktie (as distinct from the four-in-hand knot) was fashionable in Great Britain in the 1850s. Early neckties were simple, rectangular cloth strips cut on the square, with square ends. The term four-in-hand originally described a carriage with four horses and a driver; later, it also became the name of a London gentlemen's club, the Four-in-Hand Driving Company, founded in 1856. Some etymological reports are that carriage drivers knotted their reins with a four-in-hand knot (see below), whilst others claim the carriage drivers wore their scarves knotted 'four-in-hand', but, most likely, members of the club began wearing their neckties so knotted, thus making it fashionable. In the latter half of the 19th century, the four-in-hand knot and the four-in-hand necktie were synonymous. As fashion changed from stiff shirt collars to soft, turned-down collars, the four-in-hand necktie knot gained popularity; its sartorial dominance rendered the term four-in-hand redundant usage, shortened long tie and tie.

In 1922, Jesse Langsdorf of New York City introduced ties cut on the bias (US) or cross-grain (UK), allowing the tie to evenly fall from the knot without twisting; this also caused any woven pattern, such as stripes, to appear diagonally across the tie.

Today, four-in-hand ties are part of men's dress clothing in both Western and non-Western societies, particularly for business.

Four-in-hand ties are generally made from silk or polyester. Occasionally, cotton and wool are used, the latter typically knitted; these were common before World War II but are not as popular nowadays. From the advent of manufactured fabrics, microfiber ties have also appeared. In the 1950s and 1960s, microfibers such as Dacron and rayon were used but have since fallen out of favor. Modern ties appear in a wide variety of colors and patterns, notably striped (usually diagonally); club ties (with a small motif repeated regularly all over the tie); foulards (with small geometric shapes on a solid background); paisleys; and solids. Novelty ties featuring icons from popular culture (such as cartoons, actors, or holiday images), sometimes with flashing lights, have enjoyed some popularity since the 1980s.

=== Six- and seven-fold ties ===
A seven-fold tie is an unlined construction variant of the four-in-hand necktie, which pre-existed the use of interlining. Its creation at the end of the 19th century is attributed to the Parisian shirtmaker Washington Tremlett for an American customer. A seven-fold tie is constructed completely out of silk. A six-fold tie is a modern alteration of the seven-fold tie. This construction method is more symmetrical than the true seven-fold. It has an interlining which gives it a little more weight and is self-tipped.

=== Skinny tie ===
A skinny tie is a necktie narrower than a standard tie and often all-black. Skinny ties have widths of around 2 1/2 inches (6.4 cm) at their widest, compared to usually 3–4 inches (8–10 cm) for regular ties. Skinny ties were first popularized in the late 1950s and early 1960s by British bands such as the Beatles and the Kinks, alongside the subculture that embraced such bands, the mods. This is because the clothes of the time evolved into more form-fitting, tailored styles. They were later repopularized in the late 1970s and early 1980s by new wave and power pop bands such as the Knack, Blondie and Duran Duran.

=== "Pre-tied" ties and development of clip-ons ===
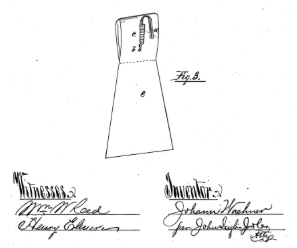
Early illustration of a pre-tied clip-on tie.

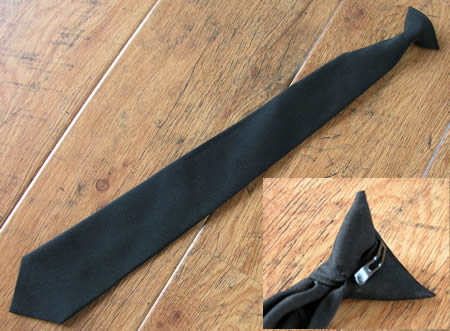
A solid black clip-on tie

The "pre-tied" necktie, or more commonly, the clip-on necktie, is a permanently knotted four-in-hand or bow tie affixed by a clip or hook. The clip-on tie sees use with children, and in occupations where a traditional necktie might pose a safety hazard to mechanical equipment operators, etc. (see § Health and safety hazards below).

The perceived utility of this development in the history of the style is evidenced by the series of patents issued for various forms of these ties, beginning in the late 19th century, and by the businesses filing these applications and fulfilling a market need for them. For instance, a patent filed by Joseph W. Less of the One-In-Hand Tie Company of Clinton, Iowa, for "Pre-tied neckties and methods for making the same" noted that:

[M]any efforts [...] in the past to provide a satisfactory four-in-hand tie so [...] that the wearer [...] need not tie the knot [...] had numerous disadvantages and [...] limited commercial success. Usually, such ties have not accurately simulated the Windsor knot, and have often had a[n] [...] unconventional made-up appearance. Frequently, [...] [they were] difficult to attach and uncomfortable when worn [...] [and] unduly expensive [...] [offering] little advantage over the conventional.

The inventor proceeded to claim for the invention—the latest version of the 1930s–1950s product line from former concert violinist Joseph Less, Iowan brothers Walter and Louis, and son-in-law W. Emmett Thiessen evolved to be identifiable as the modern clip-on—"a novel method for making up the tie [...] [eliminating] the neckband of the tie, which is useless and uncomfortable in warm weather [...] [and providing] means of attachment which is effective and provides no discomfort to the wearer", and in doing so achieves "accurate simulation of the Windsor knot, and extremely low material and labor costs". Notably, the company made use of ordinary ties purchased from the New York garment industry and was a significant employer of women in the pre-war and World War II years.

== Knots ==
A demonstration of tying a tie

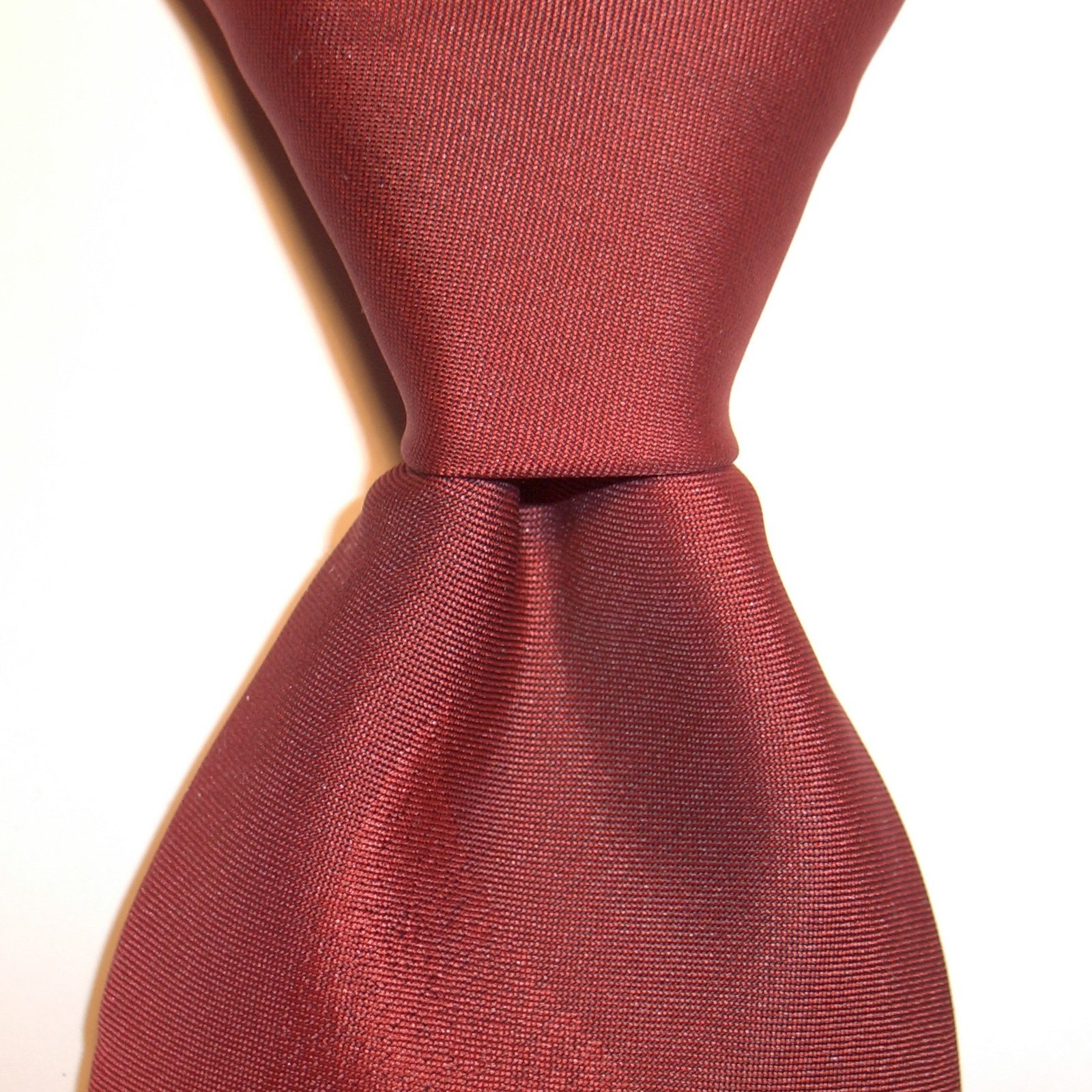
A half Windsor knot with a dimple

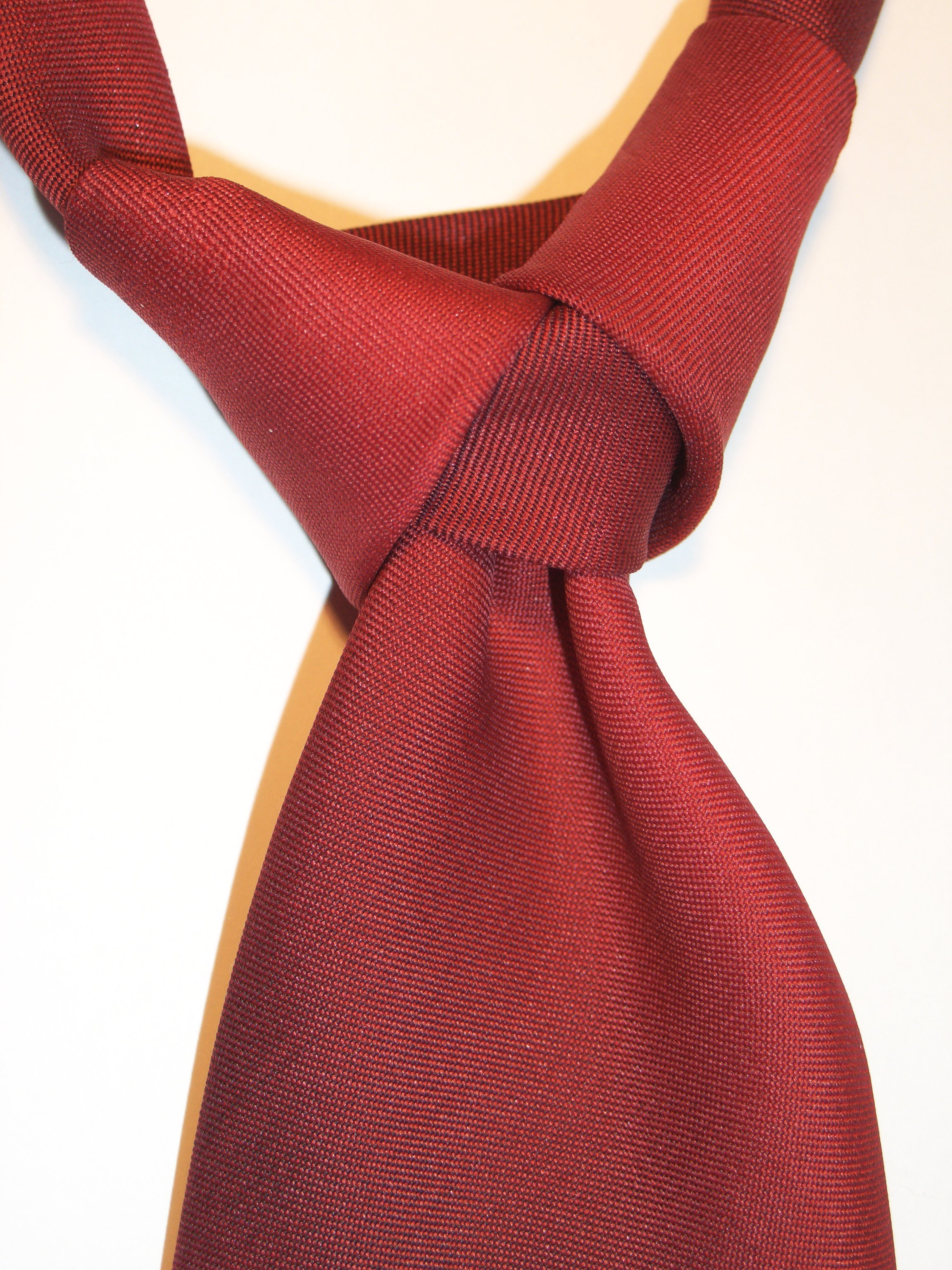
An Atlantic knot, which is notable for being tied backwards

There are four main knots used to knot neckties. In rising order of difficulty, they are:

- the four-in-hand knot — this may be the most common
- the Pratt knot (the Shelby knot)
- the half-Windsor knot
- the Windsor knot (also redundantly called the "full Windsor" and the "Double Windsor")

Although he did not invent it, the Windsor knot is named after the Edward, Duke of Windsor. The Duke favored a voluminous knot; however, he achieved it by having neckties specially made from thicker cloth.

In the late 1990s, two researchers, Thomas Fink and Yong Mao of Cambridge's Cavendish Laboratory, used mathematical modeling to discover that 85 knots are possible with a conventional tie (limiting the number "moves" used to tie the knot to nine; longer sequences of moves result in too large a knot or leave the hanging ends of the tie too short). The models were published in academic journals, while the results and the 85 knots were published in layman's terms in a book entitled The 85 Ways to Tie a Tie.

Of the 85 knots, Fink and Mao selected 13 knots as "aesthetic" knots, using the qualities of symmetry and balance with an additional three "variant" knots. Based on these mathematical principles, the researchers identified not only the four necktie knots in common use but also nine others, some of which had been used only sparingly and others believed to have been codified for the first time.

Other types of knots include:

- Small knot (also "oriental knot", "Kent knot"): the smallest possible necktie knot. It forms an equilateral triangle, like the half-Windsor, but much more compact (Fink–Mao notation: Lo Ri Co T, Knot 1). It is also the smallest knot to begin inside-out.
- Nicky knot: an alternative version of the Pratt knot, but better-balanced and self-releasing (Lo Ci Ro Li Co T, Knot 4). Supposedly named for Nikita Khrushchev, it tends to be equally referred to as the Pratt knot in men's style literature. This is the Pratt knot favored by Fink and Mao.
- Atlantic knot: a reversed Pratt knot, highlighting the structure of the knot normally hidden on the back. For the wide blade to remain in front and right-side-out, the knot must begin right-side-out, and the thin end must be wrapped around the wide end. (Ri Co Ri Lo Ci T; not cataloged by Fink and Mao, but would be numbered 5^{r} according to their classification.)
- Prince Albert knot (also "double knot", "cross Victoria knot"): A variant of the four-in-hand with an extra pass of the wide blade around the front, before passing the wide blade through both of the resultant loops (Li Ro Li Ro Li Co T T, Knot 6_{2}). A version knotted through only the outermost loop is known as the Victoria knot (Li Ro Li Ro Li Co T, Knot 6).
- Christensen knot (also "cross knot"): An elongated, symmetrical knot, whose main feature is the cruciform structure made by knotting the necktie through the double loop made in the front (Li Ro Ci Lo Ri Lo Ri Co T T, Knot 25_{2}). While it can be made with modern neckties, it is most effective with thinner ties of consistent width, which fell out of common use after the 19th century.
- Ediety knot (also "Merovingian knot"): a doubled Atlantic knot, best known as the tie knot worn by the character "the Merovingian" in the 2003 film The Matrix Reloaded. This tie can be knotted with the thin end over the wide end, as with the Atlantic knot, or with the wide end over the thin end to mimic the look seen in the film, with the narrow blade in front. (Ri Co Ri Lo Ci Ri Co Ri Lo Ci T – not cataloged by Fink and Mao, as its 10 moves exceed their parameters.)
- Trinity knot: This knot was first created by Christopher Johnson in Watertown, WI, in 2004. The 2003 film The Matrix Reloaded inspired him. It is relatively easy to tie, despite its complex look. It is best with a tie that is without taper or flare on the narrow blade. (Tying the thin end over the larger end, it can be described as Li Co Li Ro Ci Lo Ri Co T Li Ro T, with the final through move being like a Ci move. Due to having 11 moves and two through moves, it was not listed by Fink and Mao.)
- Herringbone knot (also "Eldredge knot"): This knot is tied in almost the same process as the Trinity knot, but tends to create more volume to the sides, and is thus most suited to spread or cutaway collars.
- Grantchester knot: A self-releasing, asymmetric knot.

== Ties as a sign of membership and other patterns ==
=== Club ties ===
Club ties are patterned ties, often featuring heraldic patterns, representing institutions that are most often academic, such as universities and colleges. Club ties rarely feature striped patterns and always feature a repeating shield, logo, or another pattern.

=== Regimental ties ===
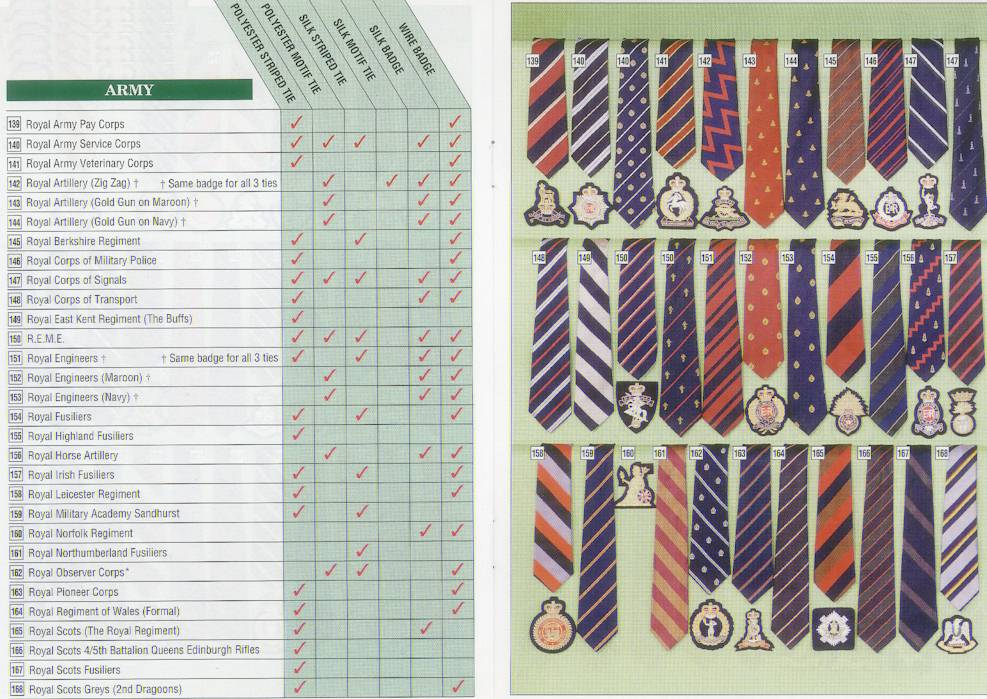
A chart of British Army "Regimental Ties," issued by the Ministry of Defence

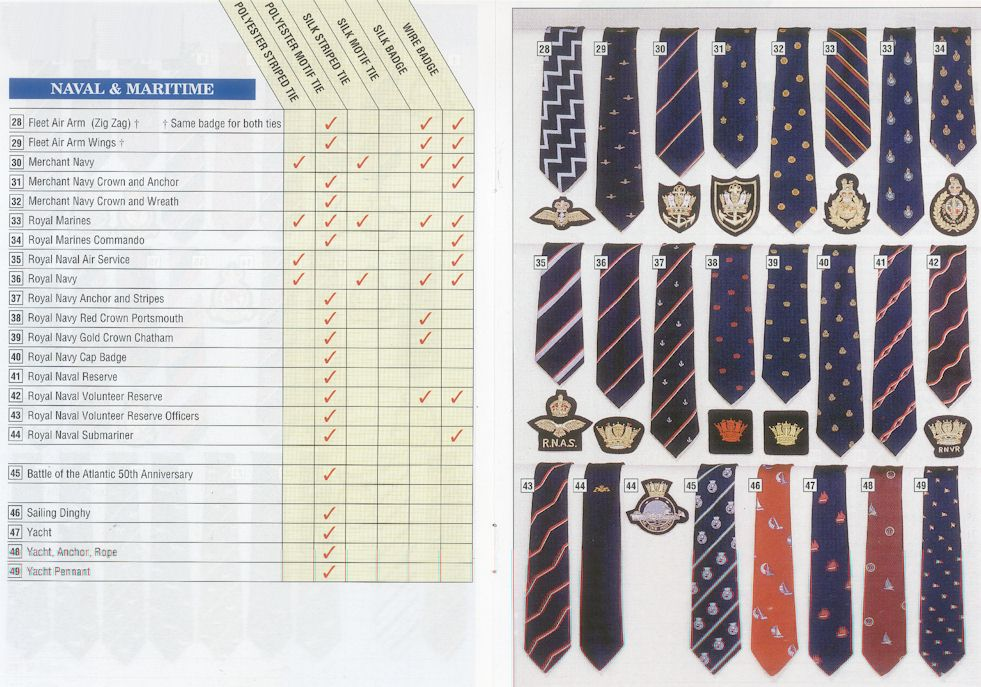
A chart of British Navy "Regimental Ties," issued by the Ministry of Defence

In Britain and other Commonwealth countries, Regimental ties denote association with a particular military regiment, corps, or service. It is considered inappropriate for persons who are unaffiliated with a regiment, university, school, or other organization to wear a necktie affiliated with that organization. In Commonwealth countries, necktie stripes commonly run from the left shoulder down to the right side, following the expression, "From heart to sword." In the James Bond franchise, the titular character wears the regimental tie of the Royal Navy, and other characters are seen wearing ties from other regiments and military organizations. Members of the British royal family are frequently seen wearing regimental striped ties corresponding to the military unit in which they have served, or to an honorary position such as colonel-in-chief.

The traditional method of styling regimental ties remains; however, not all British regiments use the Regimental pattern in the modern era. Some regiments use the Club tie pattern, and some use the Repp tie pattern.

=== Repp ties ===
Prince Albert Edward was the first sitting member of the British Royal Family to ever visit the Americas, including trips to Canada and the United States. His visit to the United States began a phenomenon of replication in the Western Hemisphere, but either out of deference to the British regiments, or because the method of replication meant that the ties had to be produced in a mirror image, the American stripe tie was produced in the reverse of the Regimental tie: from the right shoulder to the left hip.

When Brooks Brothers introduced similar striped ties in the United States, around the beginning of the 20th century, they had their stripes run from the right shoulder to the left side, in part to distinguish them from British striped regimental ties.

In the United States, diagonally striped ties are commonly worn with no connotation of a group membership. Typically, American striped ties have the stripes running downward from the wearer's right (the opposite of the European style). (However, when Americans wear striped ties as a sign of membership, the European stripe style may be used.) In some cases, American "repp stripe" ties may be reverse images of British regimental ties. Striped ties are strongly associated with the Ivy League and preppy style of dress.

=== School ties ===
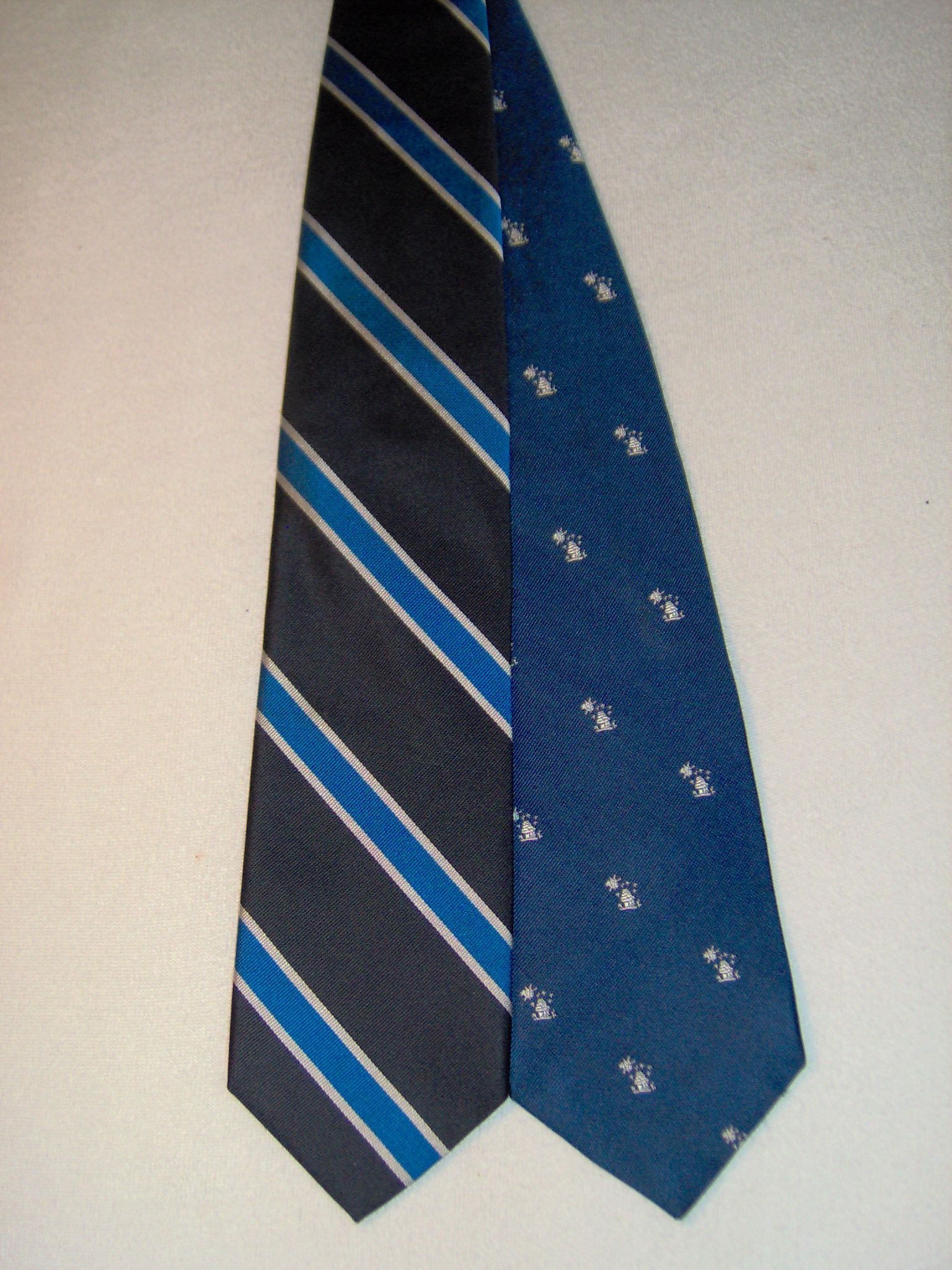
The two variants of the school tie for Phillips Academy

School ties are most often found in Club patterns or Regimental patterns. The academic variant of a striped necktie is known as the Collegiate stripe. The use of colored and patterned neckties indicating the wearer's membership in a club, military regiment, school, professional association (Royal Colleges, Inns of Court), or other institution dates only from the late-19th century England. The immediate forerunners of today's college neckties were, in 1880, the rowers of Exeter College, Oxford, who tied the bands of their straw hats around their necks.

In the United Kingdom and many Commonwealth countries, neckties are commonly an essential component of a school uniform and are either worn daily, seasonally, or on special occasions with the school blazer. In Hong Kong, Australia, and New Zealand, neckties are worn as the everyday uniform, usually as part of the winter uniform. In countries with no winter, such as Sri Lanka, Singapore, Malaysia, and many African countries, the necktie is usually worn as part of the formal uniform on special occasions or functions. Neckties may also denote membership in a house or a leadership role (i.e, school prefect, house captain, etc.).

The most common pattern for such ties in the UK and most of Europe consists of diagonal stripes of alternating colors running down the tie from the wearer's left. Since neckties are cut on the bias (diagonally), the stripes on the cloth are parallel or perpendicular to the selvage, not diagonal to it. The colors themselves may be particularly significant. The dark blue and red regimental tie of the Household Division is said to represent the blue blood (i.e. nobility) of the Royal Family, and the red blood of the Guards.

An alternative membership tie pattern to diagonal stripes is either a single emblem or a crest centered and placed where a tie pin normally would be, or a repeated pattern of such motifs. Sometimes both types are used by an organization, either to offer a choice or to distinguish among membership levels. Occasionally, a hybrid design is used, in which alternating color stripes are overlaid with repeated motif patterns.

=== Tartan ===
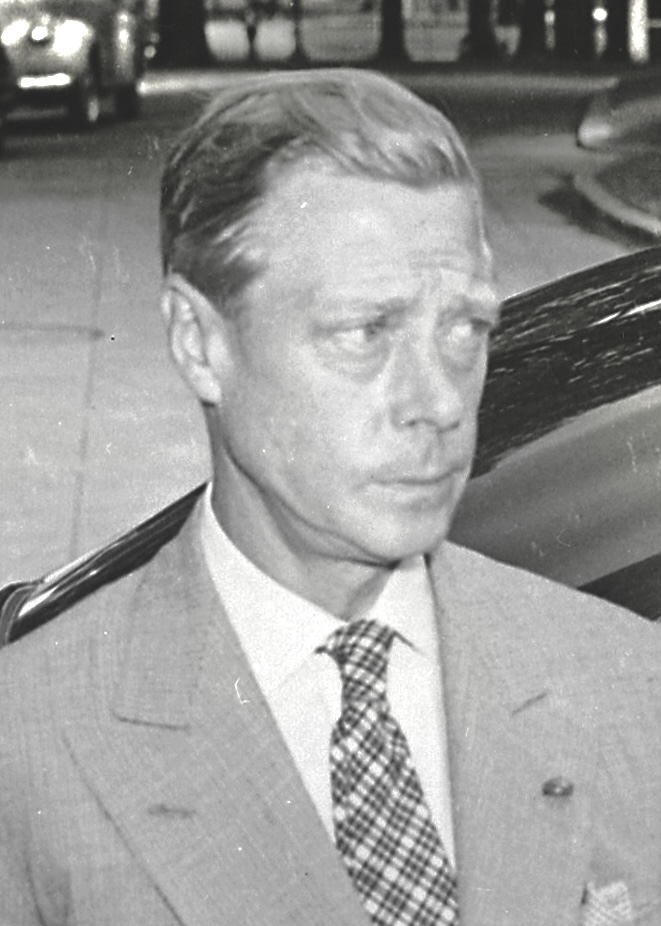
Edward, Duke of Windsor, in a tartan necktie, 1945

Tartan neckties are often found as variations on the theme of clan tartans in the Scottish Register of Tartans. Tartan (Scottish Gaelic: breacan [ˈpɾʲɛxkən]) is a patterned cloth consisting of crossing horizontal and vertical bands in multiple colours, forming repeating symmetrical patterns known as setts. Originating in woven wool, tartan is most strongly associated with Scotland, where it has been used for centuries in traditional clothing such as the kilt. Historically, specific tartans were linked to Scottish clans, families, or regions, with patterns and colours derived from local dyes.

Tartan became a symbol of Scottish identity, especially from the 16th century onward, despite bans following the Jacobite rising of 1745 under the Dress Act 1746. The 19th-century Highland Revival popularized tartan globally, associating it with Highland dress and the Scottish diaspora. Today, tartan is used worldwide in clothing, accessories, and design, transcending its traditional roots. Modern tartans are registered for organisations, individuals, and commemorative purposes, with thousands of designs in the Scottish Register of Tartans.

While often associated with Scottish heritage, tartans are found in other cultures, including Africa, East and South Asia, and Eastern Europe. They also serve institutional roles, like military uniforms and corporate branding. Tartan patterns vary in complexity, from simple two-colour designs to intricate motifs with over twenty hues. Colours historically derived from natural dyes, such as lichens and alder bark, are now produced synthetically.

=== Paisley ===
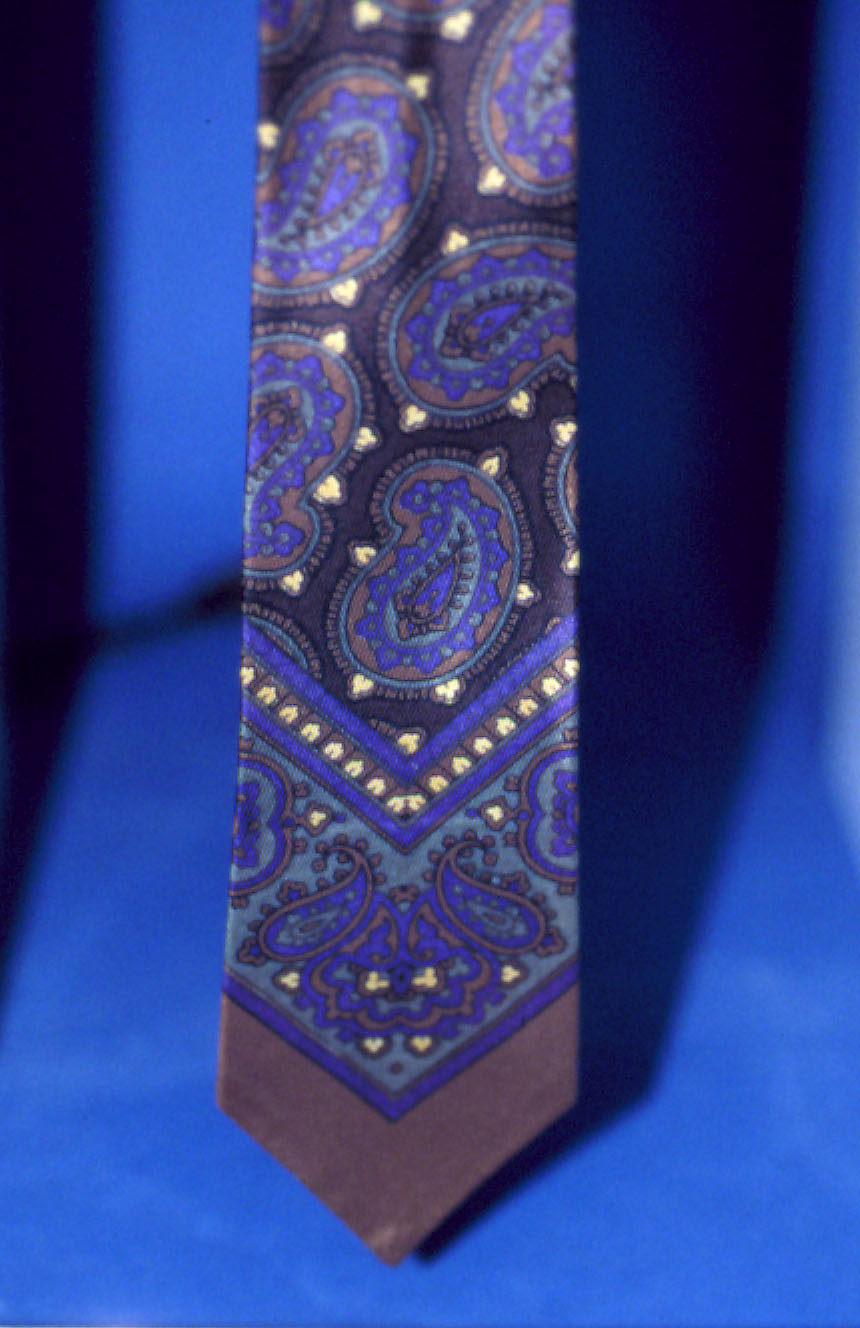
Modern paisley tie

Paisley is an ornamental textile design using the boteh (Persian: بته) or buta, a teardrop-shaped motif with a curved upper end. Of Persian origin, paisley designs became popular in the West in the 18th and 19th centuries, following imports of post-Mughal Empire versions of the design from India, especially in the form of Kashmir shawls, and were then replicated locally. The English-language name for the patterns comes from the town of Paisley, in the west of Scotland, a center for textiles where paisley designs were reproduced on jacquard looms. The pattern is still commonly seen in Britain and other English-speaking countries on neckties, waistcoats, and scarves, and remains popular in other items of clothing and textiles in Iran and South and Central Asian countries.

Some design scholars believe the buta is the convergence of a stylized floral spray and a cypress tree: a Zoroastrian symbol of life and eternity. The "bent" cedar is also a sign of strength and resistance, but modesty. The floral motif originated in the Sassanid dynasty, was used later in the Safavid dynasty of Persia (1501–1736), and was a major textile pattern in Iran during the Qajar and Pahlavi dynasties. In these periods, the pattern was used to decorate royal regalia, crowns, and court garments, as well as textiles used by the general population. Persian and Central Asian designs usually arrange the motifs in orderly rows, with a plain background.

== Occasions for neckties ==
Traditionally, ties are a staple of office attire, especially for professionals. Proponents of the tie's place in the office assert that ties neatly demarcate work and leisure time.

The theory is that the physical presence of something around your neck serves as a reminder to knuckle down and focus on the job at hand. Conversely, loosening the tie after work signals that one can relax.

Outside of these environments, ties are usually worn, especially at traditionally formal or professional events, such as weddings, important religious ceremonies, funerals, job interviews, court appearances, and fine dining.

== Opposition to neckties ==
=== Health and safety hazards ===
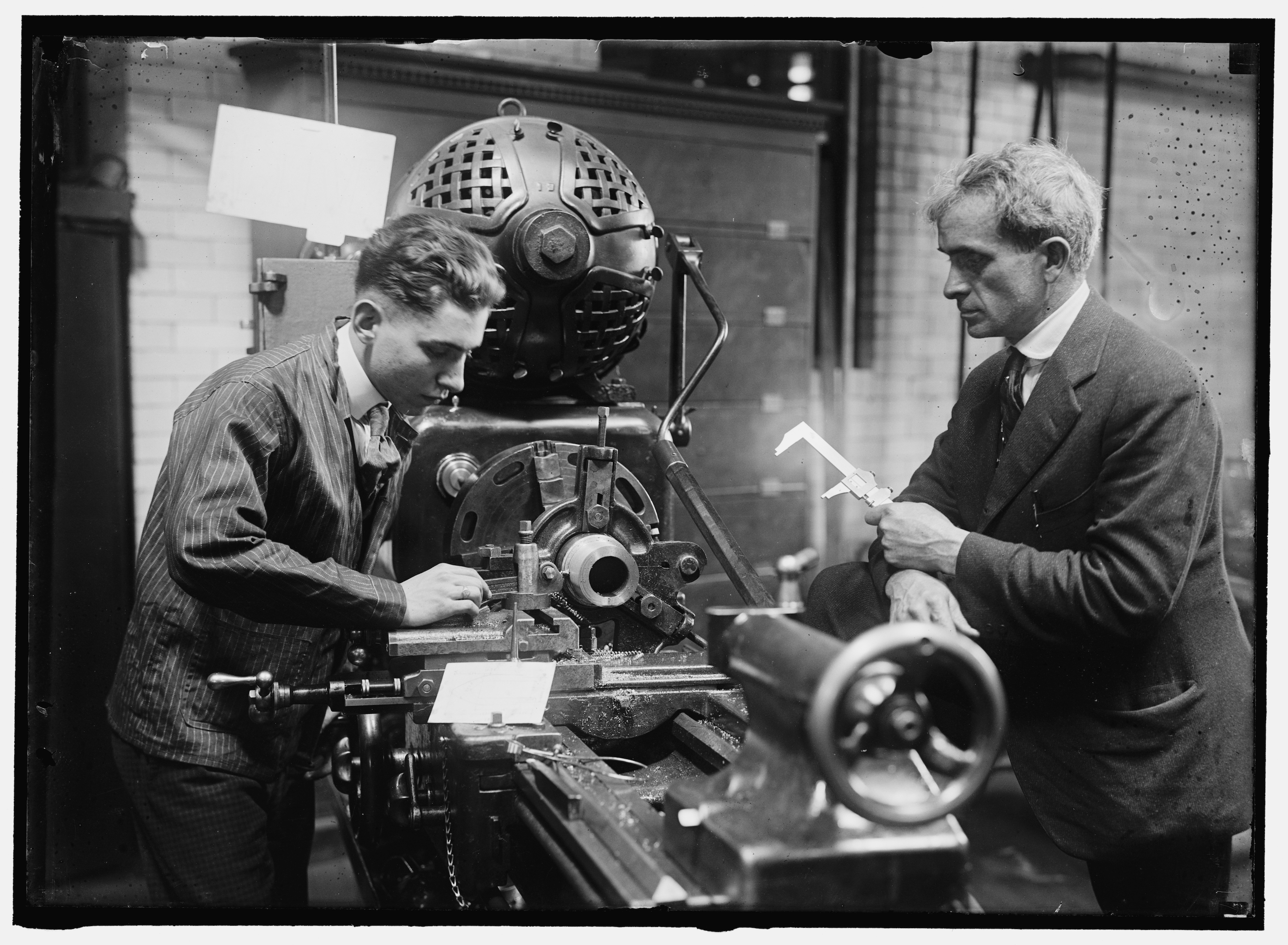
A trainee machinist and his supervisor wear neckties while at work in a machine shop in 1917

Necktie wearing presents some risks for entanglement, vasoconstriction, electrocution, and infection. Entanglement is a risk when working with industrial and heavy plant machinery, machine tools, and laboratory equipment, as well as in dangerous, possibly violent jobs such as those of police officers and correctional officers.

Police officers, traffic wardens, and security guards in the UK wear clip-on ties that instantly unclip when pulled to prevent any risk of strangulation during a confrontation. They are part of the National Framework Contract for the police uniform.

Paramedics performing life support remove the casualty's necktie as a first step to ensure it does not obstruct the airway or constrict blood flow. A 2018 study published in the medical journal Neuroradiology found that a Windsor knot tightened to the point of "slight discomfort" could interrupt as much as 7.5% of cerebral blood flow. A 2013 study published in the British Journal of Ophthalmology found increased intraocular pressure in such cases, which can aggravate the condition of people with weakened retinas. There may be additional risks for people with glaucoma.

Neckties may also pose a health risk to others, particularly in certain medical fields. In hospitals, they are believed to be vectors of disease transmission. Hospitals take seriously the cross-infection of patients by doctors wearing infected neckties, because neckties are less frequently cleaned than most other clothes. On September 17, 2007, British hospitals published rules banning neckties. Notwithstanding such fears, many general practitioners and dentists continue to wear neckties for a professional image. However, some prefer bow ties instead due to their short length and relative lack of hindrance.

=== Religious opposition ===
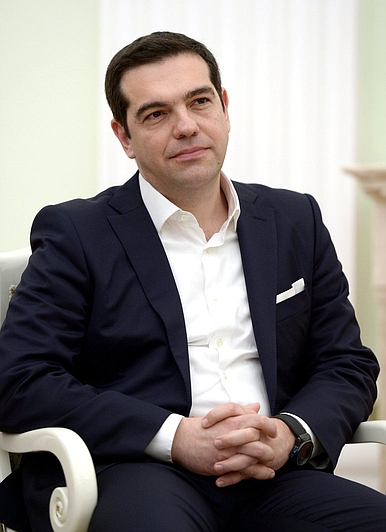
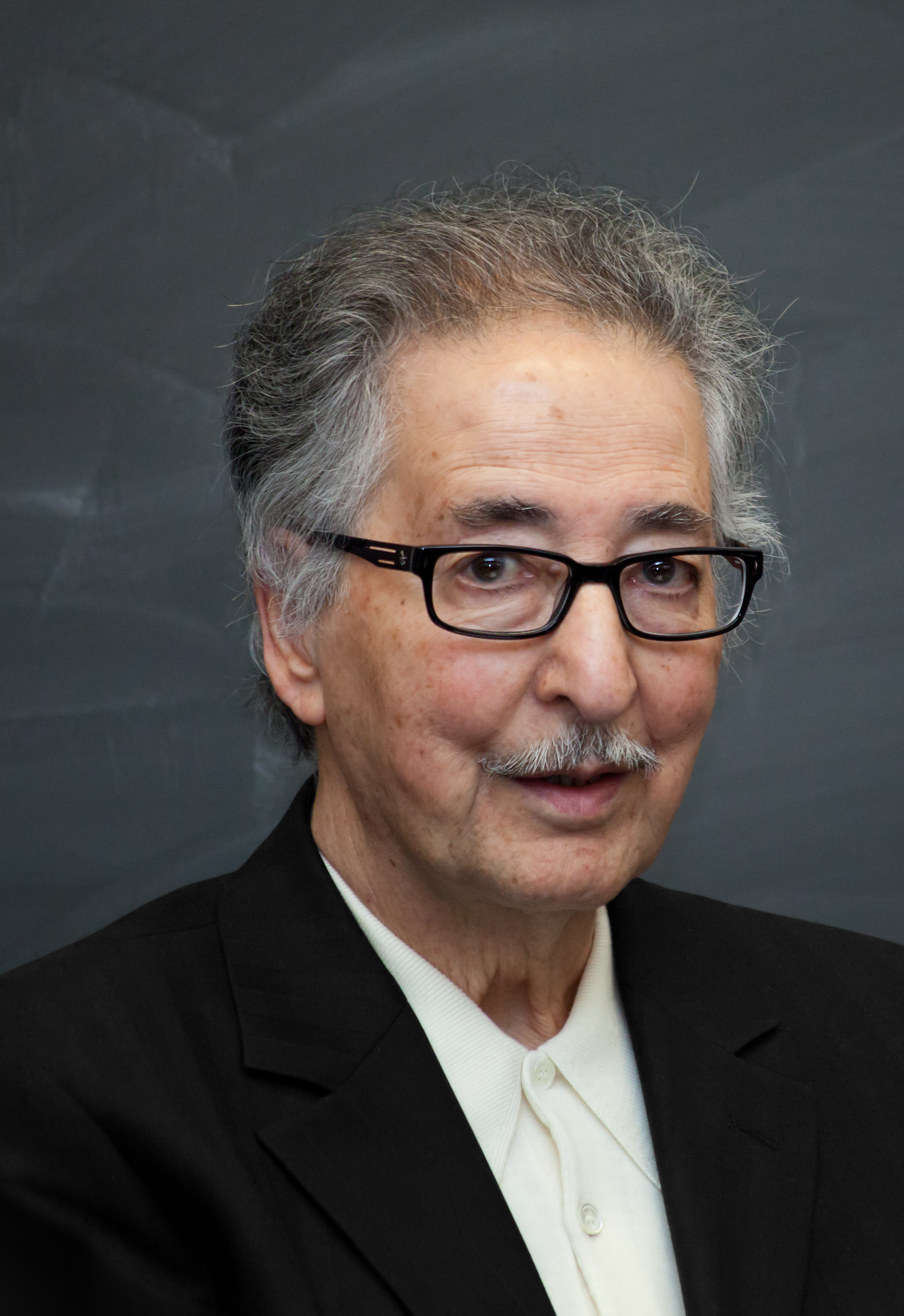
Alexis Tsipras and Abolhassan Banisadr, two male politicians who typically do not wear ties.

==== Christian denominations teaching plain dress ====
Among many Christian denominations teaching the doctrine of plain dress, long neckties are not worn by men; this includes many Anabaptist communities (such as the Conservative Mennonite churches), traditional Quakers (who view neckties as contravening their testimony of simplicity), and some holiness denominations. While Reformed Mennonites, among some other Anabaptist communities, reject the long necktie, the wearing of the bow tie is customary.

==== Islamic anti-Western sentiment ====
An example of anti-necktie sentiment is found in Iran, where the government of the Islamic Republic considers neckties to be "decadent, un-Islamic and viewed as 'symbols of the Cross' and the oppressive West". Most Iranian men in Iran have retained the Western-style long-sleeved collared shirt and three-piece suit, while excluding the necktie. While ties are viewed as "highly politicised clothing" in Iran, some Iranian men continue to wear them, as do many Westerners who visit the country.

=== Other anti-necktie sentiment ===
In the early 20th century, the number of office workers began increasing. Many such men and women were required to wear neckties because it was perceived as improving work attitudes, morale, and sales. Removing the necktie as a social and sartorial business requirement (and sometimes forbidding it) is a modern trend often attributed to the rise of popular culture. Although it was common as everyday wear as late as 1966, over the years 1967–69, the necktie fell out of fashion almost everywhere, except where required. There was a resurgence in the 1980s, but ties again fell out of favor in the 1990s, with many high-technology companies having casual dress requirements, including Apple, Amazon, eBay, Genentech, Microsoft, Monsanto and Google. At the furniture company IKEA, neckties are not allowed.

Neckties are viewed by various sub- and counter-culture movements as being a symbol of conformity, submission, and slavery (i.e., having a symbolic chain around one's neck) to the corrupt elite of society, as a "wage slave". In Western business culture, a phenomenon known as casual Friday has arisen, in which employees are not required to wear ties on Fridays and, increasingly, on other announced special days. Some businesses have extended casual dress days to Thursday, and even Wednesday; others require neckties only on Monday (to start the workweek).

In 1998, Dutch royal consort Prince Claus removed his tie at a public event, calling on the "tie-wearers of all countries" to unite and cast off the oppression of the tie. The incident gained a lot of press attention.

In 2008, the Men's Dress Furnishings Association — a trade group whose members were designers and manufacturers of neckties in the United States — shut down after 60 years' existence due to declining membership and the declining number of men wearing neckties.

In 2012, Richard Branson, founder of the Virgin Group, said ties are a symbol of British colonialism, explaining his long opposition to wearing them.

Tie Rack — a retailer devoted to just selling neckties and related accessories — that had 450 stores globally at its height, but falling sales of ties and competition from online shopping meant the firm was forced to close in 2013.

Politics has remained a bastion for formal dress and the necessity for tie-wearing.

In the United States in 2019, US presidential candidate Andrew Yang drew attention when he appeared on televised presidential debates without a tie. Yang dismissed questions about it from the press, saying that voters should be focused on more important issues.

New Zealand Member of Parliament Rawiri Waititi has long been vocal in his opposition to neckties, calling them a "colonial noose". In February 2021, he was ejected from Parliament for refusing to wear a tie, drawing attention and parliamentary debate, which ultimately resulted in the requirement being dropped from N.Z. parliament's appropriate business attire requirements for males.

== See also ==
- History of Western fashion
- Collar (clothing)
- Tie chain
- Tie clip
- Tie press
- Neckerchief
- Bolo tie
