= De Woude =

- Village
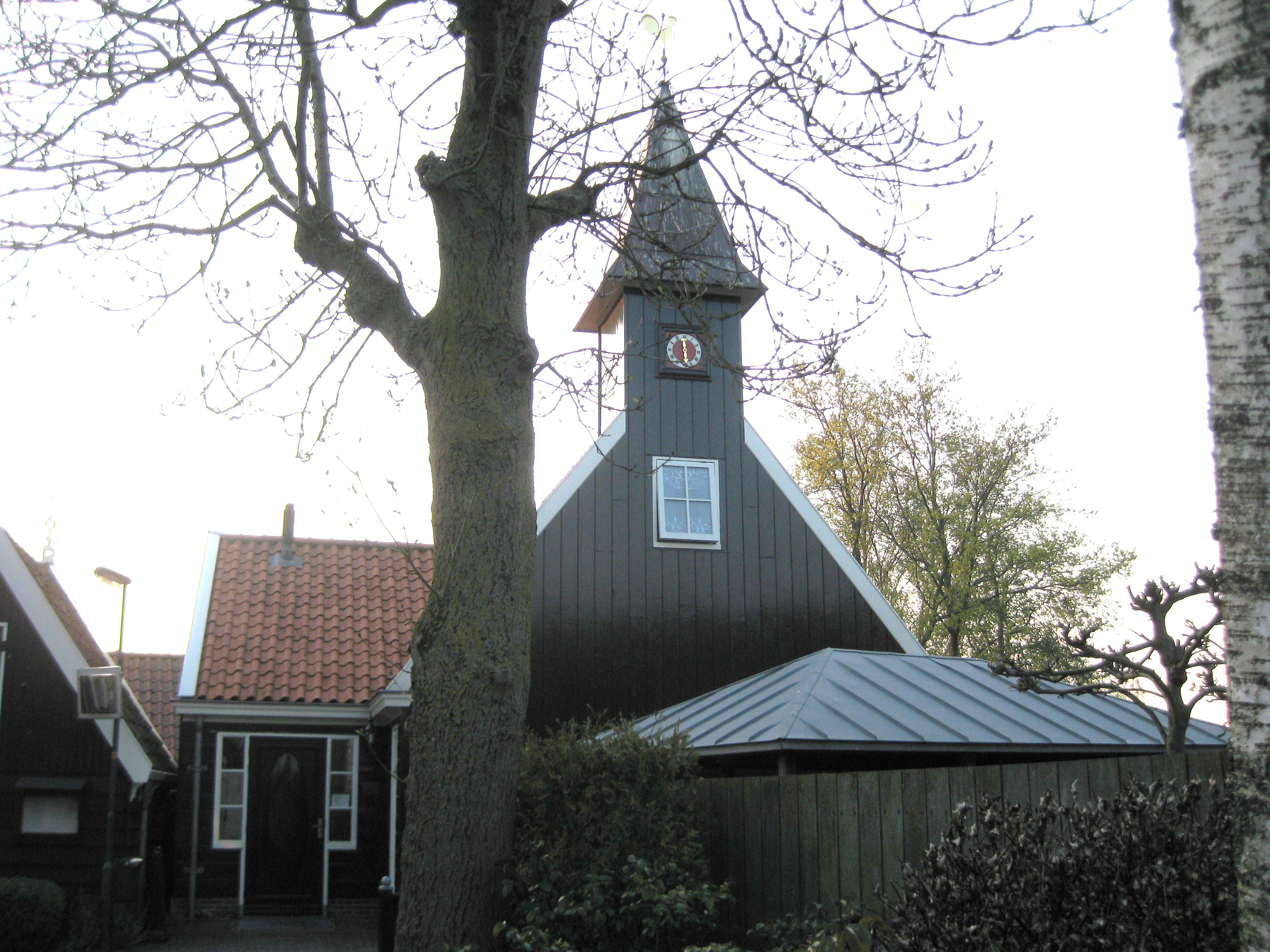
- Dutch Reformed church

- Location in the Netherlands Location in the province of North Holland in the Netherlands
- Coordinates: 52.5461°N 4.7743°E
- Country: Netherlands
- Province: North Holland
- Municipality: Castricum

Area
  - Total: 4.76 km^{2} (1.84 sq mi)
- Elevation: −0.7 m (−2.3 ft)

Population (2021)
  - Total: 160
  - Density: 34/km^{2} (87/sq mi)
- Time zone: UTC+1 (CET)
  - Summer (DST): UTC+2 (CEST)
- Postal code: 1489
- Dialing code: 075

De Woude is a village in the Dutch province of North Holland. It is a part of the municipality of Castricum, and lies about 9 km south of Alkmaar. Until 1 January 2002, De Woude belonged to the municipality of Akersloot. The village is located on an island in the Alkmaardermeer and can only be reached by ferry.

The Dutch Reformed church "De Kemphaan" is a little wooden church which was rebuilt by the villagers in 2002. The old church from the 16th century had become derelict and beyond repair, and a village house was desired by the inhabitants of De Woude. The church is in use for meetings, cultural activities and can be rented for weddings and parties.
