= Hortus Bulborum =

Dutch foundation that conserves bulb and tuber crops

Coordinates: 52°33′55″N 4°41′35″E

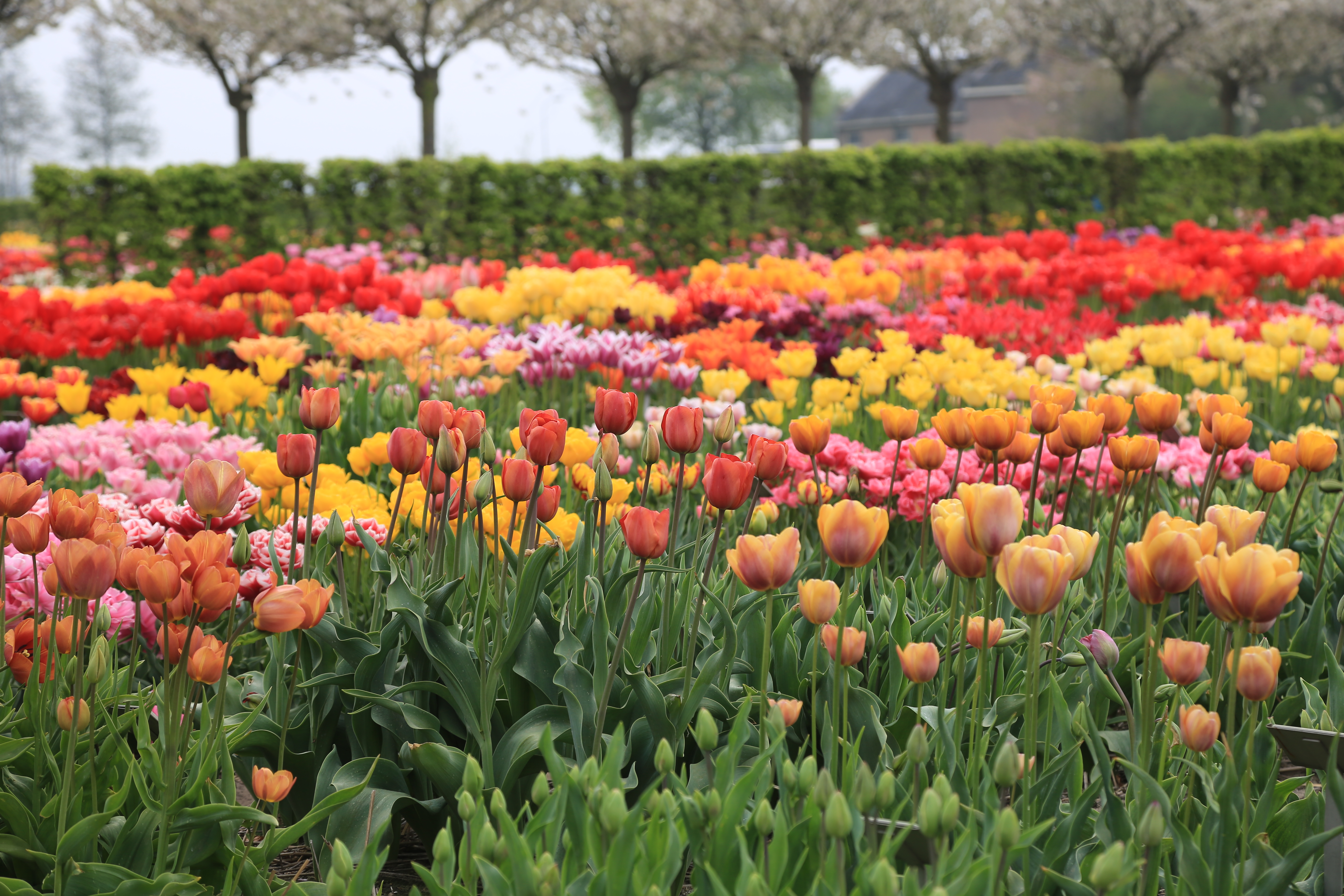
The Hortus Bulborum (April 2014)

Hortus Bulborum is a Dutch foundation that conserves historic cultivars of spring flowering bulb- and tuber crops. The collection garden of the foundation is located at the Zuidkerkenlaan in Limmen, North Holland, Netherlands, near the historic city of Alkmaar.

The collection comprises some 2500 different cultivars, of which 2000 are tulips, 115 hyacinths, circa 800 narcissus, more than 20 irises, 50 crocuses as well as some 20 different Fritillarias. The oldest tulip in the collection is the single early tulip ‘Duc van Tol Red and Yellow’, dating from 1595. The oldest narcissus, the 'Dubbele Kampernelle', also known as Narcissus ‘Alba Odorus Plenus’, has been known since 1602. The oldest Fritillaria: F. imperialis ‘Prolifera‘ should have been mentioned in 1577.
