= Cees Koppelaar =

Dutch trainer (1939–2021)

- Born: Cornelis Maarten Koppelaar; 28 August 1939; Sliedrecht, Netherlands
- Died: 26 April 2021 (aged 81); Akersloot, Netherlands
- Occupations: Athlete trainer coach

Cornelis Maarten "Cees" Koppelaar (28 August 1939 – 26 April 2021) was a Dutch athlete, trainer and coach.

Koppelaar was a Dutch athlete who made it to the national team in the 800 metres and 4 × 400 metres relay. However, he had his best successes as trainer and coach. He was trainer of the athletics national team, several field hockey teams (SCHC and HC Bloemendaal) and football teams (Ajax, RKC Waalwijk). He trained main Dutch sportsmen including footballers Johan Cruijff, Marco van Basten and field hockey players Teun de Nooijer and Floris Jan Bovelander. He became also coach of HC Bloemendaal and the Ireland men's national field hockey team.

Before joining the Ajax training and coaching team, he acted as a trainer for the national team in the 800 and 4x400 meter sports. He eventually became head coach for the Bloemendaal hockey club after being a long time running trainer there. Koppelaar was married to Willeke, who he first met while conducting coaching on the Jan Blankers athletic track.

Koppelaar died on 26 April 2021, aged 81.
