= Brouwershofje =

Coordinates: 52°22′46″N 4°37′52″E

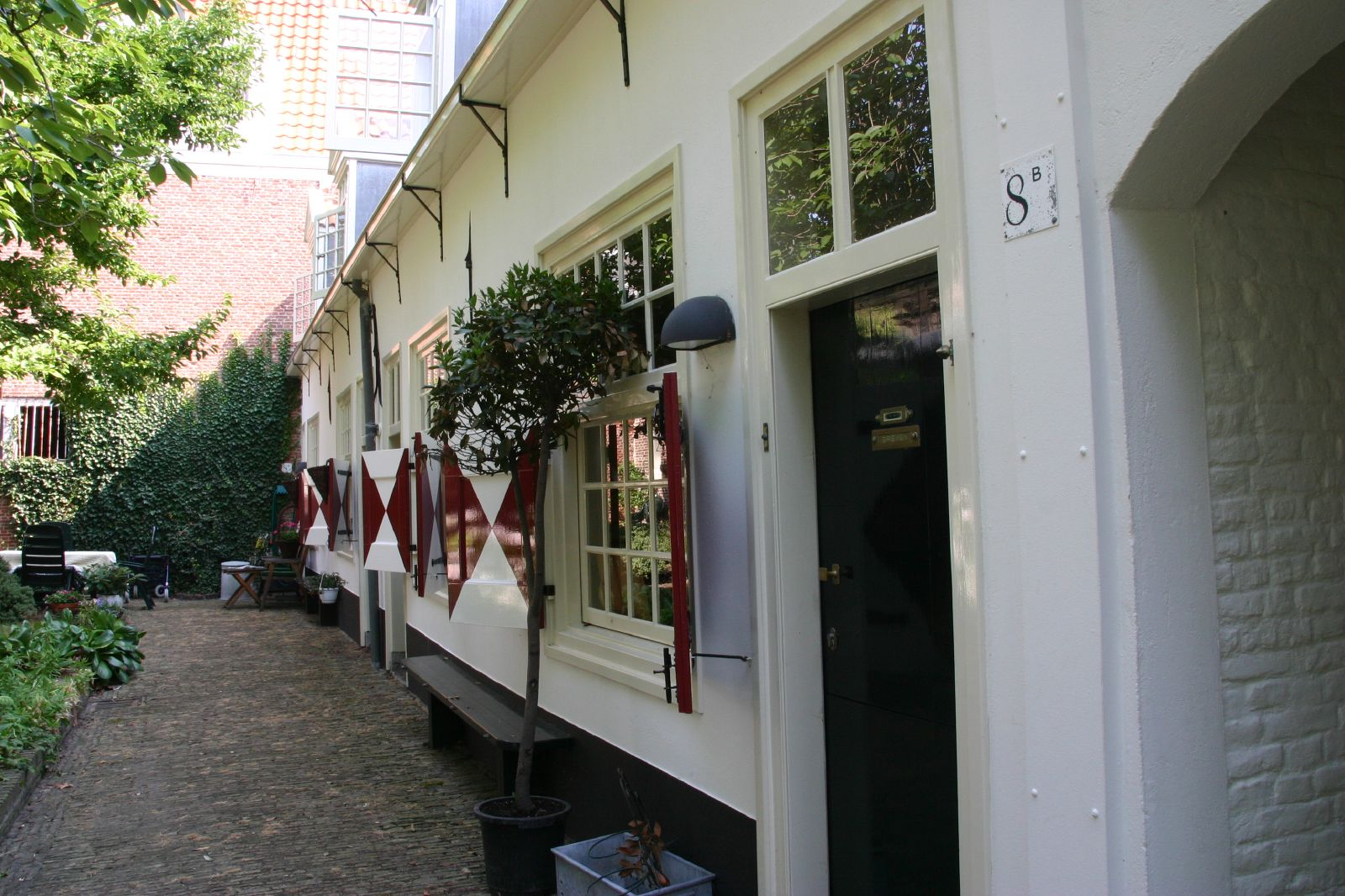
Inside the door of the Brouwershofje, the little houses (4 on each side of the doorway) are plastered white.

The Brouwershofje is a hofje on the Tuchthuisstraat in Haarlem, Netherlands.

== History ==
The Hofje was founded by the Haarlem Guild of Beer brewers, one of the most powerful guilds in Haarlem. It was initially named the St. Maartenshofje after the patron saint of the brewers. It was intended as a charitable home for 22 poor people ("rechte arme huyszitten") who worked in the brewing industry. The Brewer's guild used the money for the hofje from a donation it received in 1472 by Jacob Huyge Roepersz and his sister Katharina, who donated a series of small houses (kameren) in the Gasthuisstraat (the Tuchthuisstraat used to be a northern extension of the Gasthuisstraat) for housing, and some land in Akersloot for rents. The donation made the requirement that the houses needed to be rebuilt if they were damaged by fire or any other reason.

The Roeper family was a brewers family, so the hofje was run by the 4 Brewer's guild vinders or aldermen, and the deacon, who became the 5 hofje regents. Though the foundation did not stipulate "women only", the hofje was used for brewer's maids too old or sick to work. In 1553 it was again enriched with a donation by Mr. Dierick Diericsen Bram, who stipulated in his will that the money from his annuity would go to the St. Elisabeth Gasthuis if money was paid out from his annuity for any other reason than for repairs and renovations on the hofje houses. The finances of this hofje were never very great, and in 1562 when the malt-makers (moutmakers) guild was merged with the brewers guild, the malt-makers were required to make a yearly donation to the St. Maartenshofje.

The hofje burnt down in the great fire of 1576, but there was only enough money from the rents to rebuild it years later in 1586, with a reduction in the number of houses to 8. The names of the brewers who attended to the rebuilding were listed in Samuel Ampzing's History of Haarlem and these were Jan Aelbertsz Ban, Matthijs Florisz, Matthijs Aelbertsz Ban, Barent Wiggertsz Kousebant, Klaes Aelbertsz Vooght, Frans Adriaensz, Kies & Gerbrant Kornelisz Burst. The original rules of the hofje had burned also, so a new set of rules was made up in 1597. Their dead were buried in two graves located the chapel of the H. Geesthuis (where now the Hofje van Oorschot is) until the 18th century, when they bought three graves in the St. Bavochurch.

=== "Rechts houden" ===
The renovation in 1586 included building a blind wall on the street side with a doorway leading to the garden and the houses. The iron anchors on the brick wall are numbered 1586 on the north side of the door. This blind wall was to protect the hofje inhabitants from the strangers on the other side of the street; the inhabitants of the Tuchthuis. This was the Haarlem house of corrections. At the North end of the street a house still has a plaque which says Rechts houden, or keep to the right, which also means stay straight in the sense of conducting oneself with the proper behavior. Coming from the North, the hofje is on the right and the Tuchthuis was on the left. The old Tuchthuis is now a modern apartment building. The old gate to the Tuchthuis, which also had a blind wall on the street side, is now part of the Frans Hals Museum. In 1930 the hofje was renovated again in order to install modern plumbing and electricity, and at that time eight windows were cut in the blind wall to allow more light.

== Hofje today ==
When the Brewers guild was disbanded (along with the other Haarlem guilds) at the start of the French occupation in 1795, the hofje was run by a city-appointed committee, and since 1811 after the departure of the French, the hofje has been run by the Haarlem city council. Monumentenzorg takes care of the houses, and the Plantsoenendienst takes care of the garden.

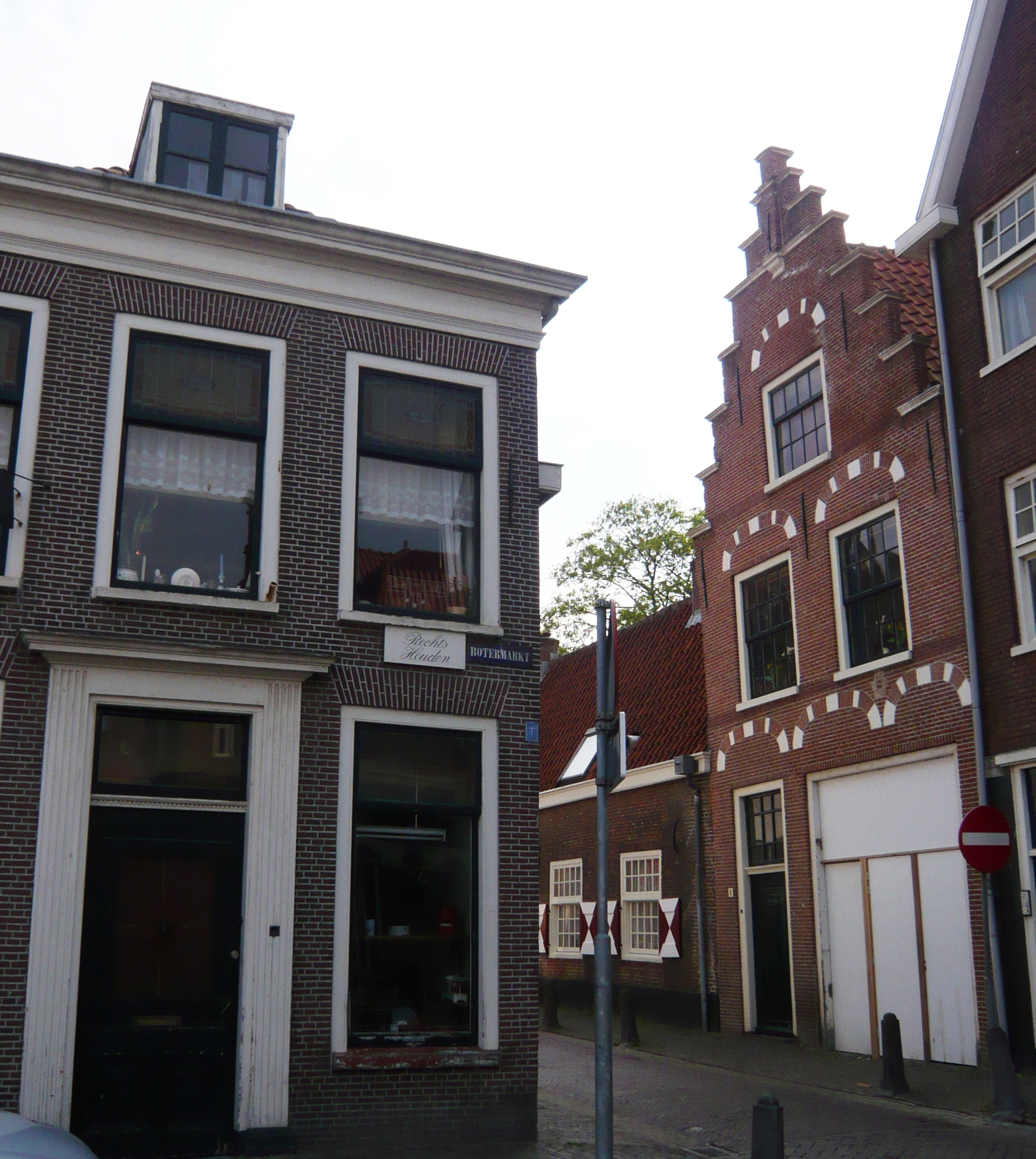
North side of the Tuchthuissttraat with the northernmost corner of the hofje visible in the middle.

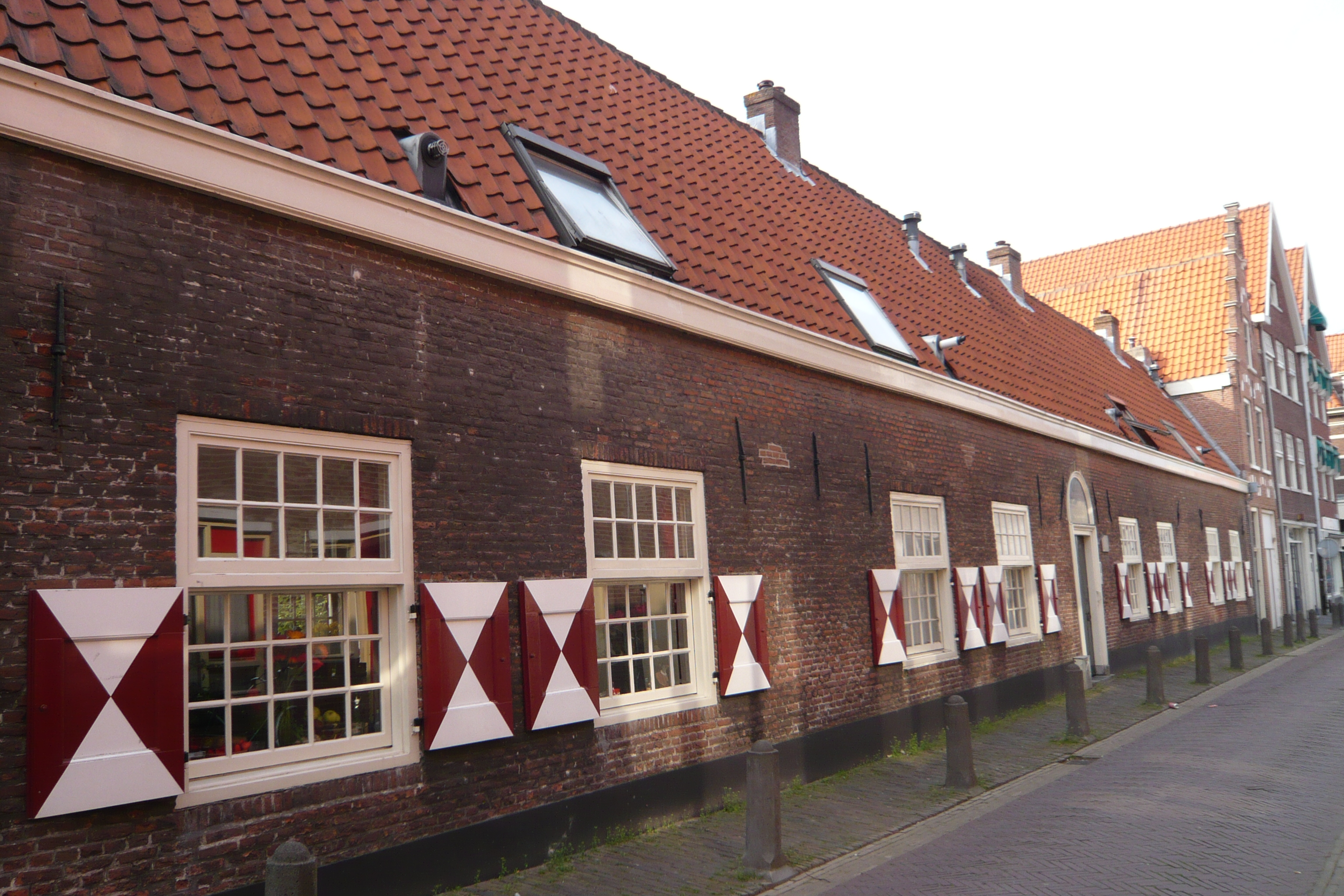
Brouwershofje from the Tuchthuisstraat.

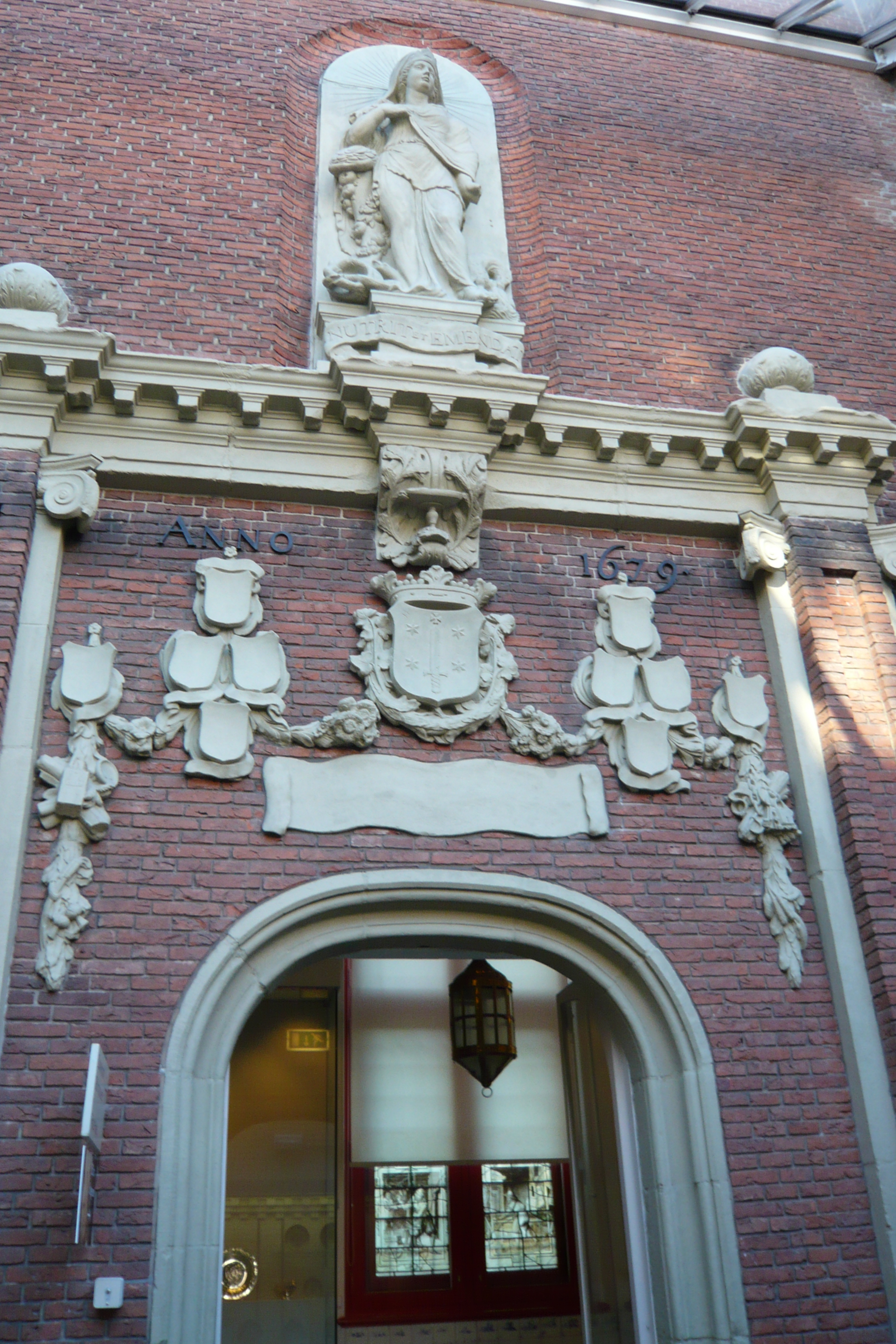
Former entry to the Tuchthuis itself, which used to be located across from the hofje, but has been installed in the Frans Hals Museum.
