= Castricum =

- Municipality
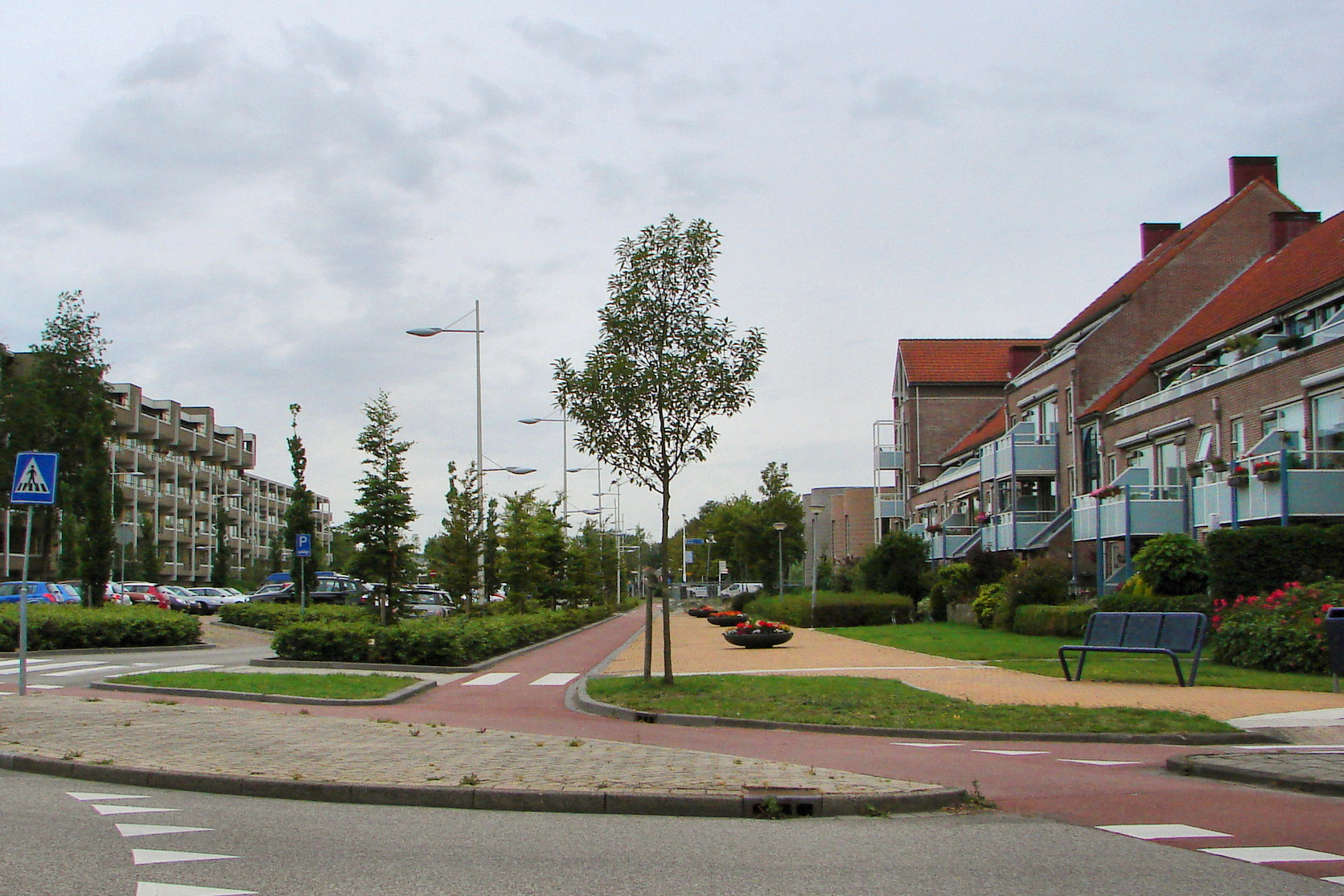
- Street in Castricum

- Flag Coat of arms

- Location in North Holland
- Coordinates: 52°33′N 4°40′E
- Country: Netherlands
- Province: North Holland

Government
  - Body: Municipal council
  - Mayor: Ben Tap (D66)

Area
  - Total: 60.40 km^{2} (23.32 sq mi)
  - Land: 49.68 km^{2} (19.18 sq mi)
  - Water: 10.72 km^{2} (4.14 sq mi)
- Elevation: 0 m (0 ft)

Population (January 2021)
  - Total: 36,086
  - Density: 726/km^{2} (1,880/sq mi)
- Demonym: Castricummer
- Time zone: UTC+1 (CET)
  - Summer (DST): UTC+2 (CEST)
- Postcode: 1489, 1900–1906, 1920–1921
- Area code: 0251
- Website: www.castricum.nl
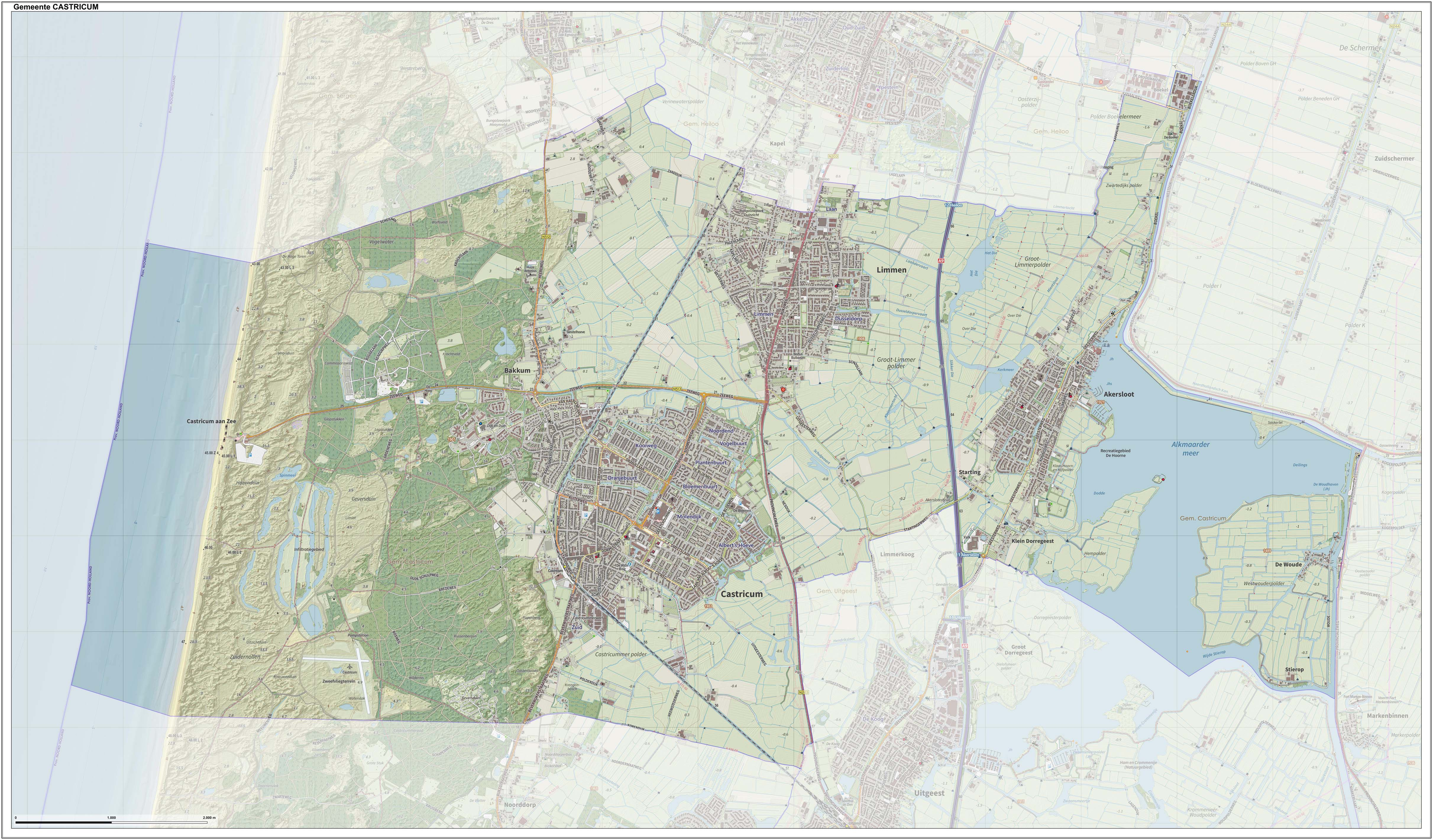
- Map of Castricum, June 2015

Castricum (Dutch pronunciation: [ˈkɑstrikʏm]) is a municipality and a town in the province of North Holland in the Netherlands.

Castricum is a seaside town in the province of North Holland. It attracts tourists who come mainly to visit the beach and nearby dune landscape. Lake of Alkmaar-Uitgeest is in the vicinity, with facilities for sailing and windsurfing.

== History ==
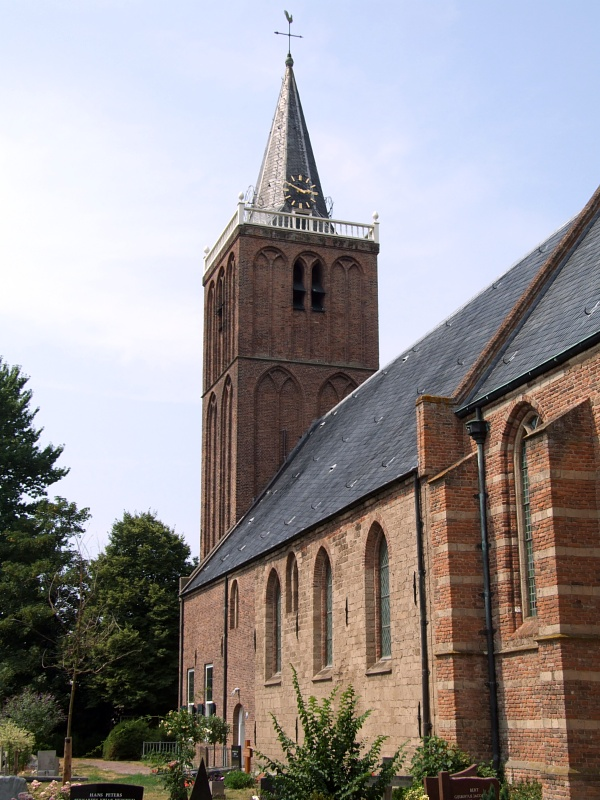

On 6 October 1799, a Franco-Dutch army under Guillaume Brune defeated an Anglo-Russian army under Ralph Abercromby and the Duke of York in the Battle of Castricum.

The municipalities of Akersloot and Limmen merged into the municipality of Castricum on 1 January 2002.

== Population centres ==
The municipality of Castricum is made up of the towns, villages and districts of: Castricum, Akersloot, Bakkum, De Woude and Limmen.

== Transportation ==
The town is served by Castricum railway station. It has regular trains to Amsterdam, with a journey time of 19 minutes.

== Local government ==
The municipal council of Castricum consists of 25 seats which, after the 2026 election, divided as follows:

- Lokaal Vitaal – 7 seats
- Green Left / PvdA – 4 seat
- VVD – 4 seats
- D66 – 3 seats
- Forza! Castricum – 3 seats
- CDA – 2 seats
- De Vrije Lijst – 1 seat
- Party for the Animals – 1 seat

After 2026 a college van burgemeester en wethouders (the municipal board) was formed to include Lokaal Vitaal.

== Castricum aan Zee ==
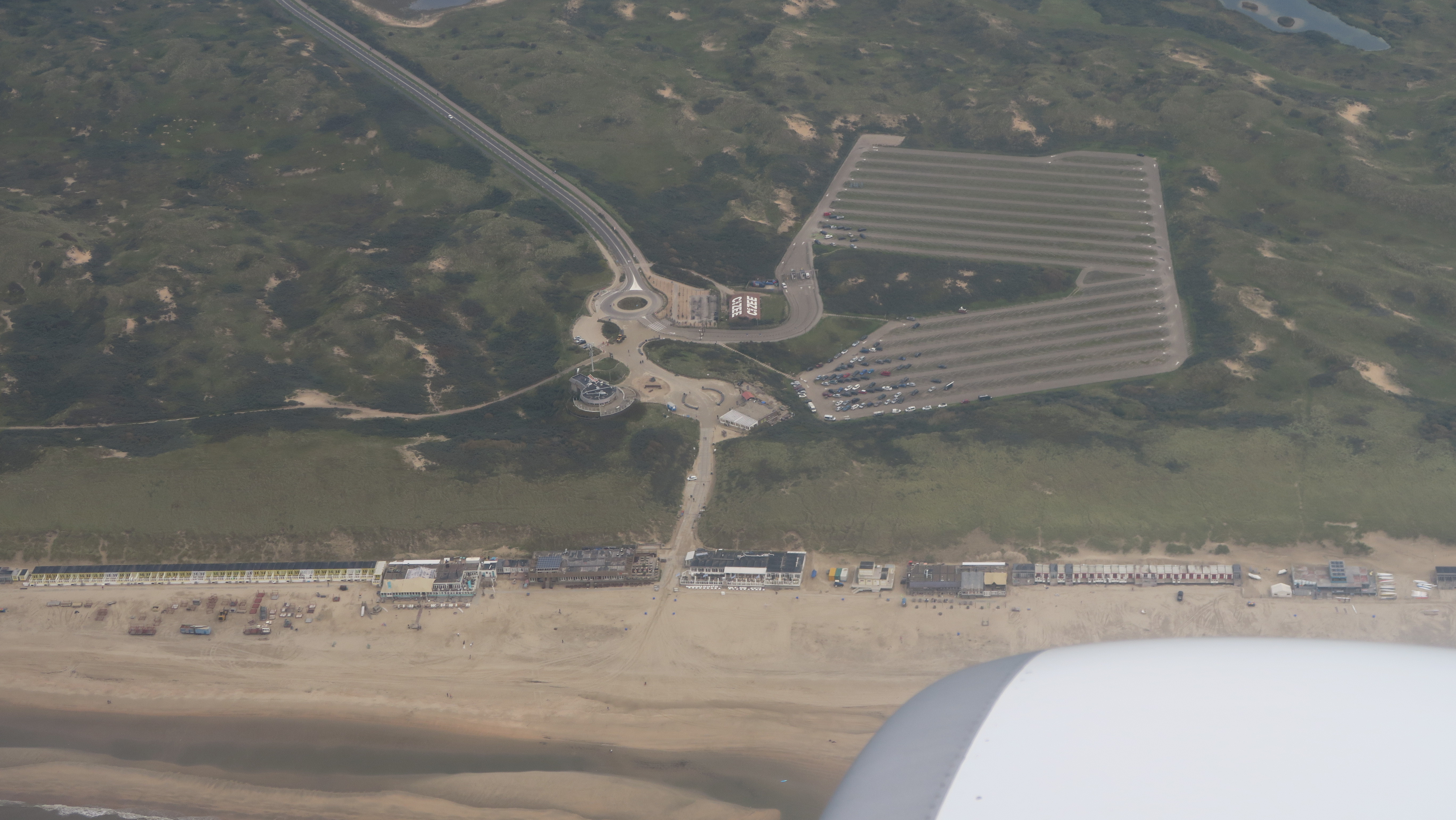
Aerial view of Castricum aan Zee

Castricum aan Zee is the seaside resort of Castricum. It is located on the North Sea coast at 52.5563°N 4.6077°E. It used to be called Bakkum aan Zee, and mainly consists of holiday homes, camping sites and the occasional house. Duincamping Bakkum is the oldest camp site of the Netherlands. The dune area used to be owned by Sophie, Princess of Albania. In 1906, a group of nature lovers asked permission to camp. The princess granted permission, and it developed into a permanent camp site.

In 1942, construction started of the Atlantic Wall to defend against an Allied invasion. As part of the wall Stützpunkt Castricum was built, and 104 bunkers were constructed in the dunes. Many have been demolished, but some are still hidden under the sand. In 2020, a previously unknown bunker was discovered buried in the sand.

== Notable people ==
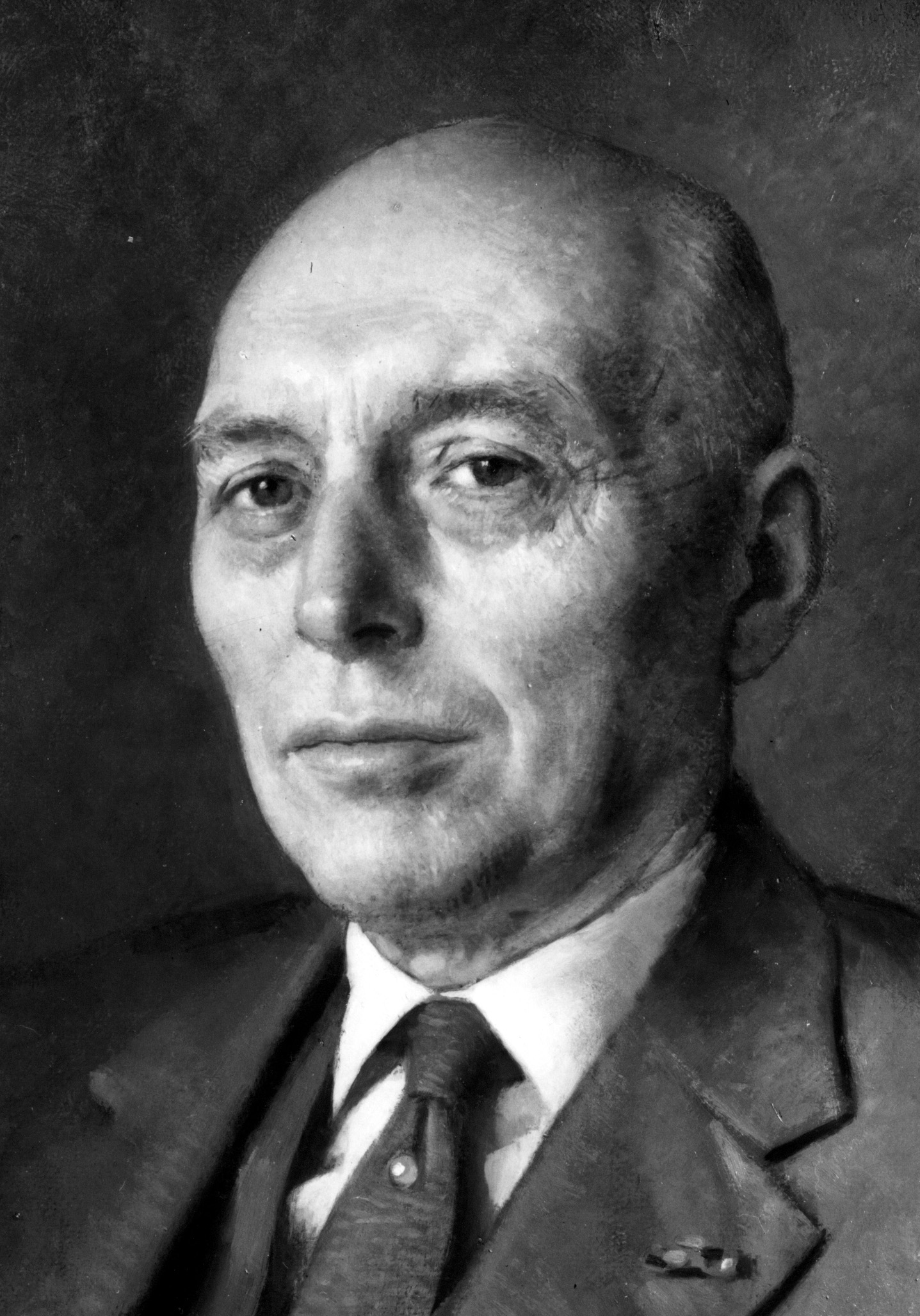
Wim Schermerhorn, 1946

- Willem Jacobszoon Coster (1590 in Akersloot – 1640) Dutch colonial Governor of Zeylan in 1640
- John Ton (1826 in Akersloot – 1896) an American abolitionist active in the Underground Railroad in Illinois.
- Willem Schermerhorn (1894 in Akersloot – 1977) a Dutch politician, Prime Minister of the Netherlands 1945/1946
- Abraham Louis Schneiders (1925 in Castricum – 2020) a Dutch diplomat and writer
- Jan Gmelich Meijling (1936 in Heemstede – 2012) a Dutch politician, naval officer and Mayor of Castricum from 1978 to 1985
- Theo van den Boogaard (born 1948 in Castricum) a Dutch cartoonist
- Henk Jaap Beentje (born 1951 in Bakkum) a Dutch botanist, works at the Royal Botanic Gardens, Kew
- Sefa Jeroen Vlaarkamp (2000 in Alkmaar) a Dutch frenchcore musician

=== Sport ===
- Arjan de Zeeuw (born 1970 in Castricum) a retired Dutch footballer with 553 club caps
- Eddy Putter (born 1982 in Akersloot) a Dutch football player with over 200 club caps
- Kees Luijckx (born 1986 in Beverwijk) a Dutch footballer with over 270 club caps
- Teun Koopmeiners (born 1998 in Castricum) a Dutch footballer playing for Juventus
- Fabian Holland (born 2002, raised in Akersloot) a New Zealand rugby player for the All Blacks

== See also ==
- Huis van Hilde, provincial archaeology centre in Castricum

== Gallery ==
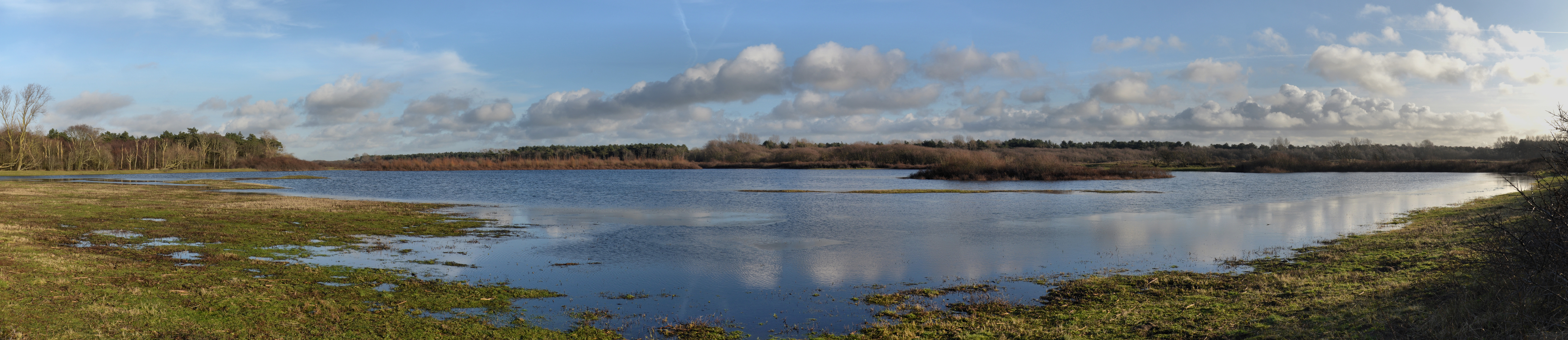
Weide van Brasser, Castricum
