= Coomanshof =

Former hofje in Haarlem, Netherlands

Coordinates: 52°23′01″N 4°37′54″E

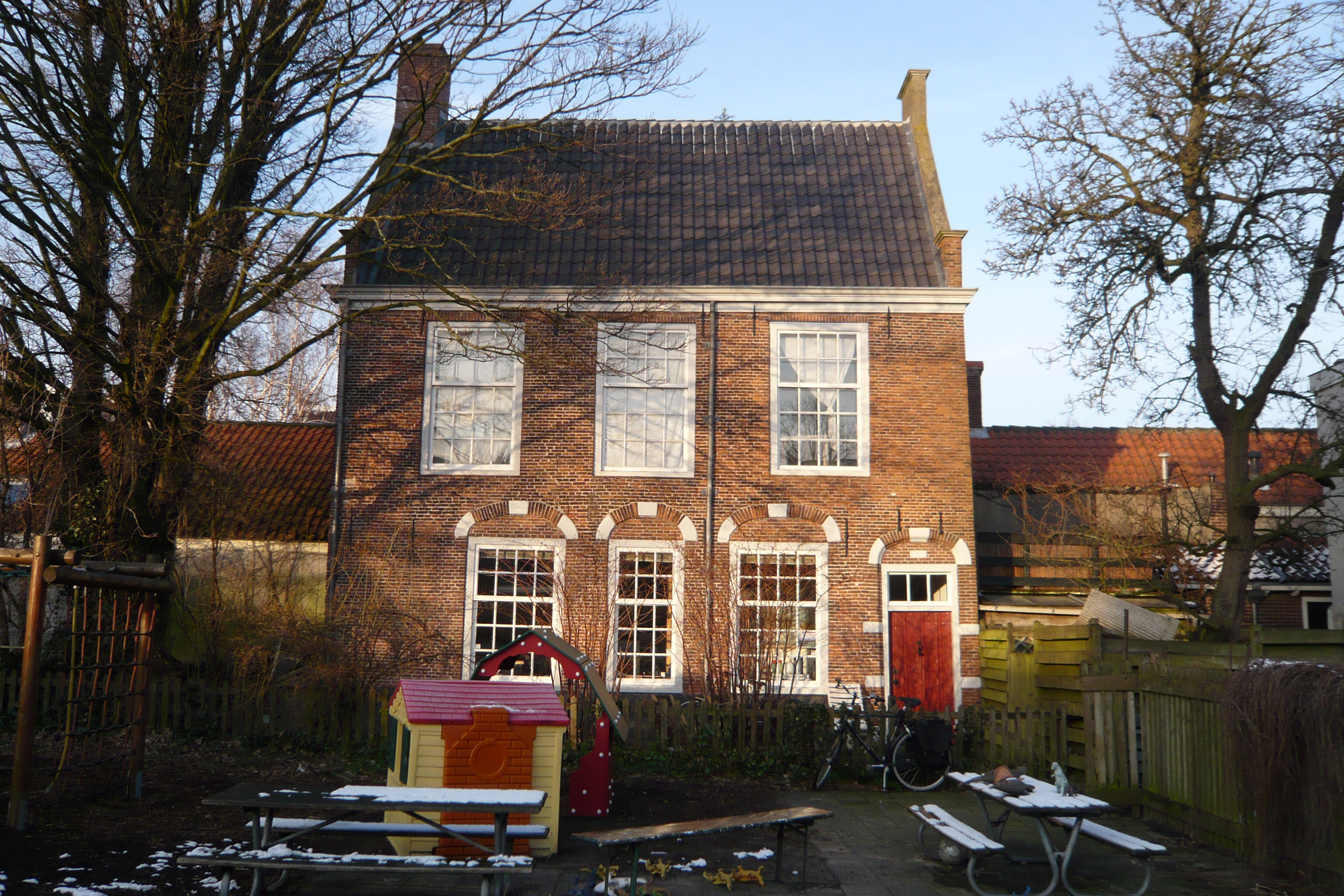
The former guild house of the Coomanshof behind the Witte Herenstraat.

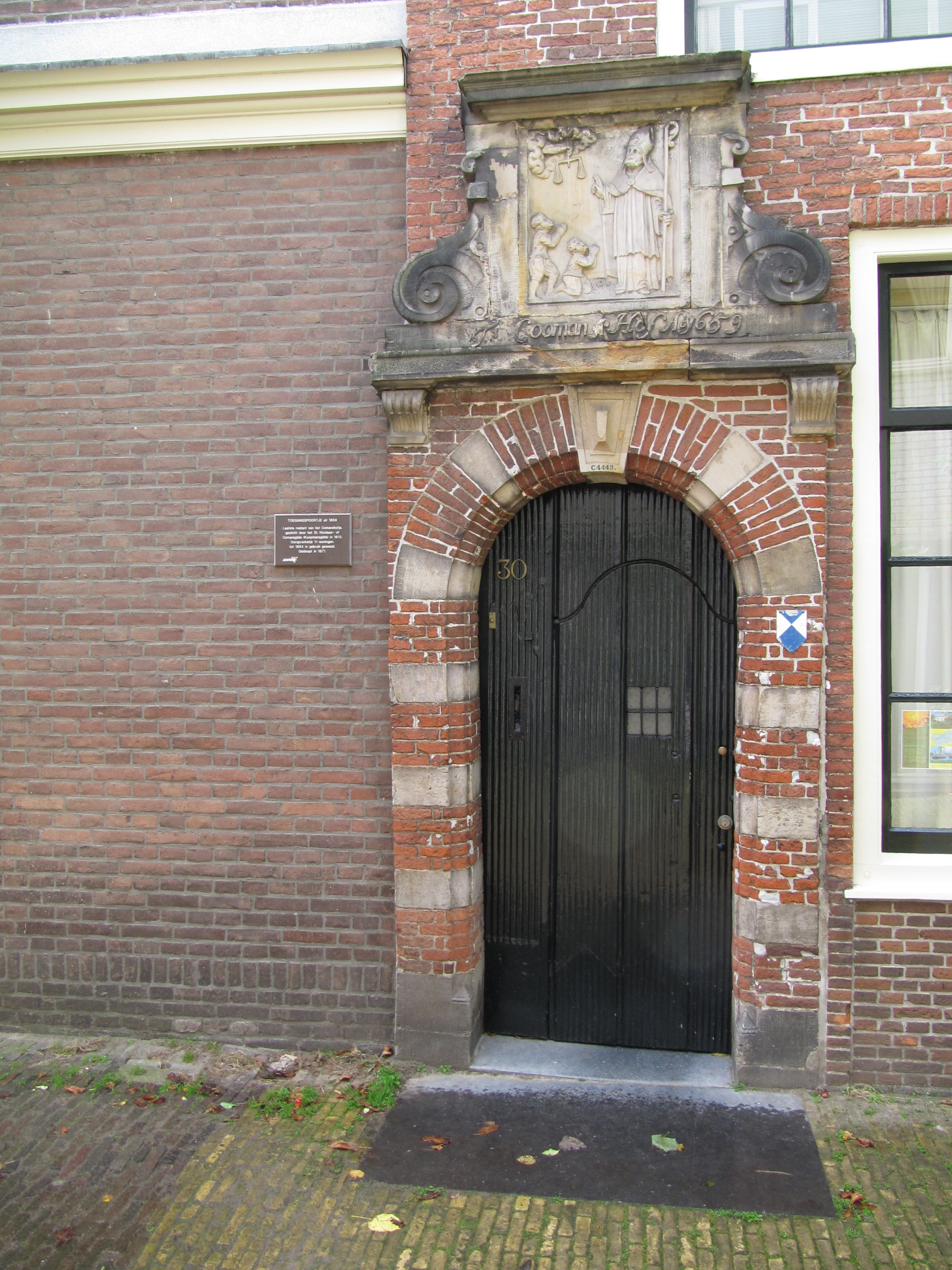
Former entrance on the Witte Herenstraat

The Coomanshof is a former hofje in Haarlem, Netherlands, on the Witte Heren straat.

It was named the "mercerie" or cramersneringhe after the local merchant's guild that existed from 1407. The small guild house dates from 1644. The hofje that grew around it is typical of the type of occupational hofjes such as the Brouwershofje that grew out of the local Brewer's guild. The patron saint of the merchants was Saint Nicholas, also the patron saint of Amsterdam. When the guilds were disbanded under Napoleon in 1798, the hofje was rented out until 1854 when it was sold. When the local head of the archives Adriaan Justus Enschedé bought the property in 1871, he demolished the eleven small hofje houses but kept the guild house as a folly for his garden. His main home was on the Zijlstraat. Enschede also found the original gable stone and had it reinstalled in 1871 above the doorway in the Witte Herenstraat.

== Paradijsje ==
In 1950 Godfried Bomans began his Teisterbant club on the Grote Markt and he was able to rent this guild house and garden as a summer meeting place, which he dubbed "Het Paradijsje" (little paradise). In 1951 the artist Anton Heyboer moved in and lived there with his wife Elsa and they were later joined by the sculptor Piet van Heerden and his wife. In the summer months Heyboer hung lanterns in the branches of the orchard in the yard and served fish from IJmuiden to the Teisterbant club members. As an artist he was inspired by the old tiles on the walls and floor of the small guild house and motifs from the floor tiles can be seen in his etchings from this period.

In 1955 the garden with the small guild house was bought back from its owner by the city of Haarlem and it was restored in 1962. Today it serves as an artist's workshop and can be reached through the gate of the children's playground called "Paradijsje".
