= Huis van Hilde =

Coordinates: 52°32′41″N 4°39′30″E

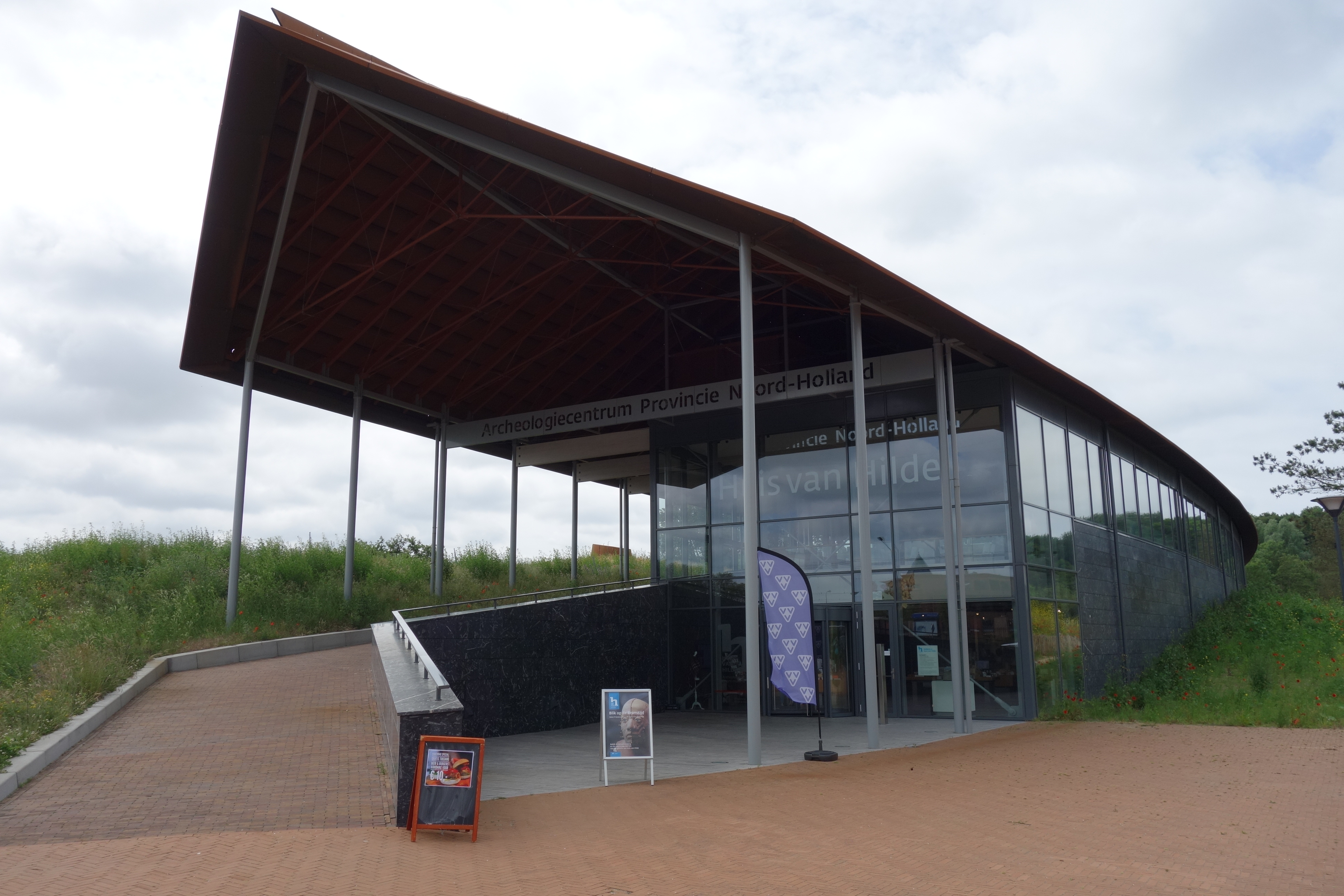
The museum, seen from Castricum station

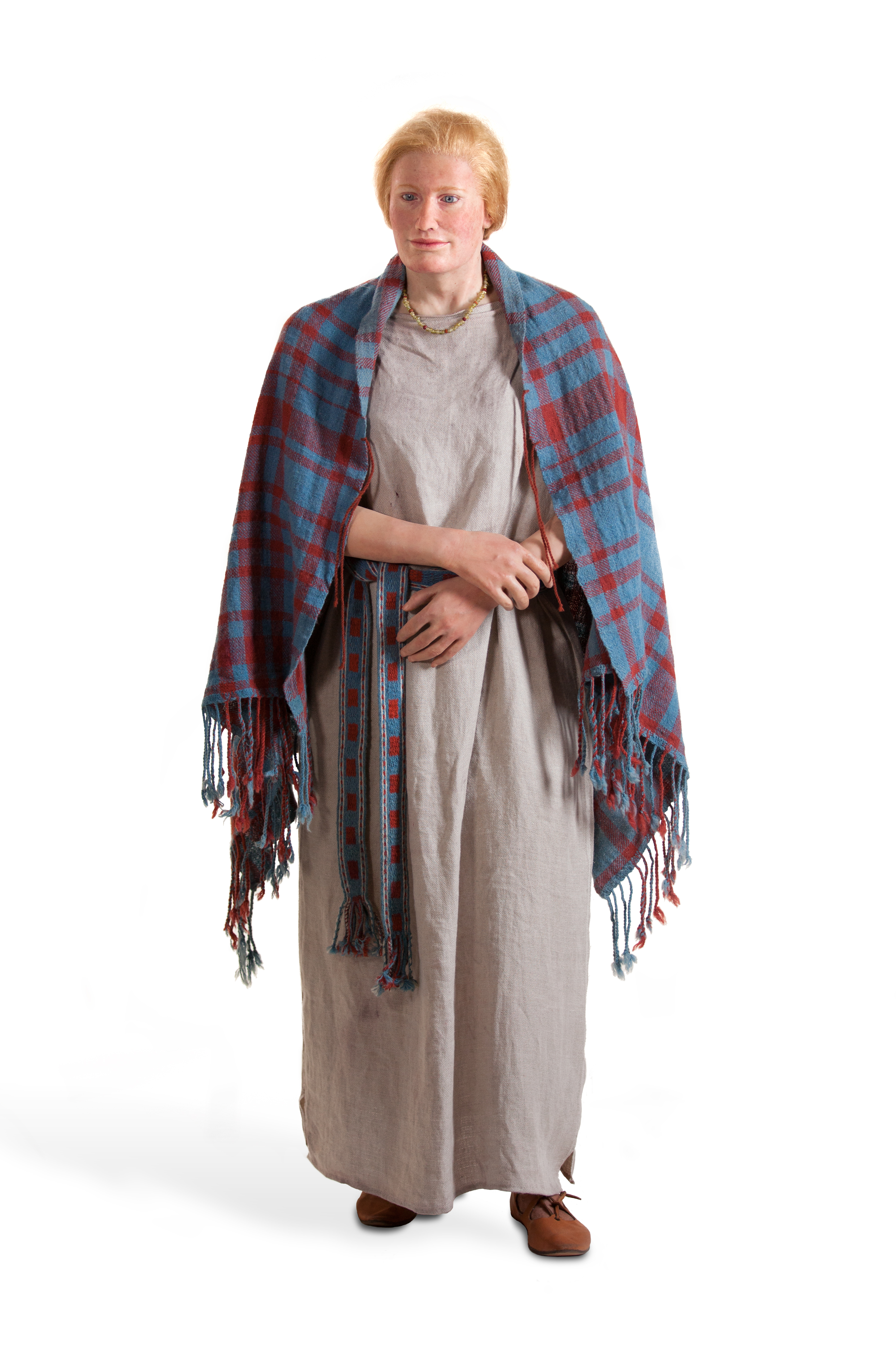
Hilde

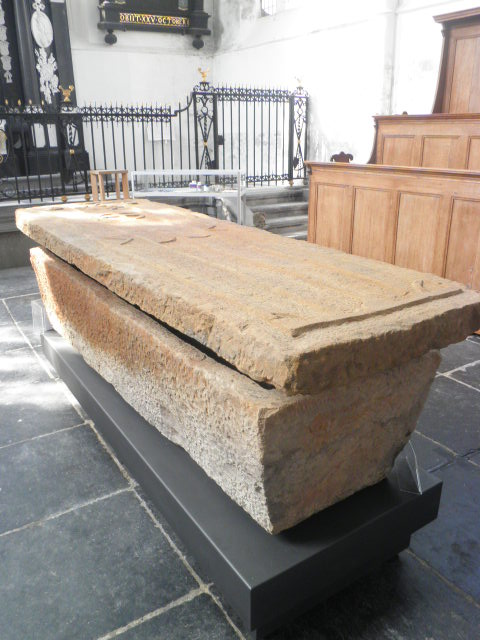
12th Century sarcophagus, found in Etersheim, stored in Huis van Hilde

Huis van Hilde (Hilde's House) is the archaeology information centre and repository of the Dutch province of North Holland, which was opened in Castricum early 2015. It was named after a model and facial reconstruction that was made of a skeletal find from the 4th century and that came to be known as Hilde (of Castricum).

== The province ==
In the Netherlands the preservation and conservation of archaeological finds is a task of the provinces. Up to 2014 North Holland used a former rice-mill in Wormer for that purpose, but the depot was too small and climate control was insufficient. In 2011 the province decided to build an archaeological information centre in Castricum. Construction started mid-2013 and the new centre opened in January 2015.

== Building ==
The building by Fons Verheijen has an oblong shape with a slightly curved facade, freely modelled after medieval farms of which remnants were found in North Holland. It has 4200 m² of floor space, 2200 of that is for the climate controlled repository.

The centre has a permanent exhibition with around a 1000 finds dating from the Neanderthal period onwards. Show pieces are two medieval sarcophagi found in Hem and Etersheim, three historical canoes and 14 models of humans, based on skeletal finds. The centre also has floor space reserved for temporary exhibitions.

== Hilde ==
In 1995 rescue archaeology was performed, prior to the construction of the area Oosterbuurt in Castricum. Some thousands of (parts of) objects were found, the skeleton of a young woman among them. Further research showed that this woman had lived in the mid 4th century, had an age of 24 to 30 when she died and probably grew up in the eastern part of Germany. Utrecht UMC made scans of the skull, from which anthropologist Maja d'Hollosy made a facial reconstruction, that she called Hilde. Afterwards Hilde played a central role in a 2006 book about archaeology in North Holland, titled The Land of Hilde and a full model was made of her.
