= Piet van Heerden =

Dutch sculptor and painter

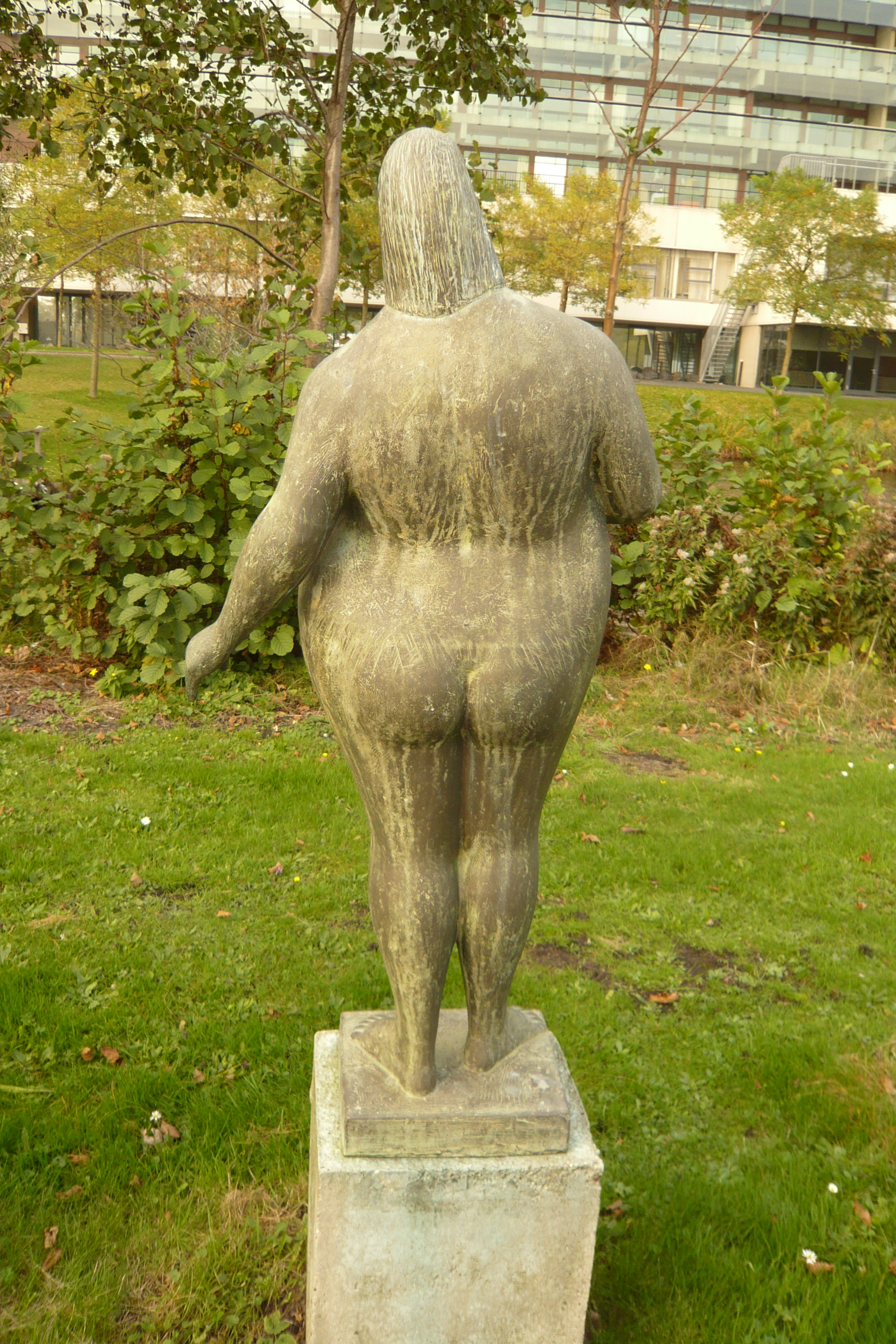
Bronze "Woman near water", garden of the Kennemer Gasthuis, 1987

Piet van Heerden (1924 – 1996), was a Dutch sculptor and painter.

== Biography ==
He was born in Haarlem. He became an artist in Haarlem after following training as a painter and sculptor at the Koninklijke Academie voor Schone Kunsten in Antwerp. He lived one winter in 1952 with Elsa and Anton Heyboer in 't Paradijsje, the nickname given to the small guild house of the Haarlem Coomanshof. In 1965 his work was shown in Heemstede along with that of his friend Wim Steijn.

He died in Haarlem.
