= Abraham Louis Schneiders =

Dutch writer and diplomat (1925–2020)

Bram Schneiders
- Born: Abraham Louis Schneiders; 1 October 1925; Castricum, Netherlands
- Died: 2 July 2020 (aged 94); Hilversum, Netherlands
- Other names: Drievoeter, A. van Anders
- Occupations: writer, diplomat

Abraham Louis “Bram” Schneiders (1 October 1925 — 2 July 2020) was a Dutch writer and diplomat. He was ambassador of the Netherlands to Cameroon, Equatorial Guinea, Central African Republic, Gabon, Chad (1979-1982), Zimbabwe (1982-1986); New Zealand, Fiji, Tonga; Samoa (1986-1990) and Tuvalu (1987-1990).

As writer he had pseudonyms Drievoeter and A. van Anders.

== Career ==
Schneiders was born in Castricum as son of Louis Abraham Schneiders (1893-1956), who was a medical doctor since 1931 at the GG&GD in Rotterdam, and Anna Margaretha Dorothea Schlüter (1897-1992). He studied Dutch East Indies Jurisprudence at the University of Utrecht and Leiden. He served in the army between 1948 and 1950 in Indonesia during the Indonesian National Revolution. Subsequently, he worked at the Ministry of Education, Arts and Sciences, as deputy secretary of the Board of Curators of the Leiden University. From 1964 until his retirement in 1990 he worked at the Ministry of Foreign Affairs. He held positions at the Dutch embassies in Nigeria, Lagos (1969-1973) and Indonesia (1973-1977). From 1978 to 1979 he was a spokesman for the Ministry of Foreign Affairs. Thereafter he was ambassador of the Netherlands to Cameroon, Equatorial Guinea, Central African Republic, Gabon; Chad (1979-1982; based in Yaoundé), Zimbabwe (1982-1986); and based in Wellington to New Zealand, Fiji, Tonga; West-Samoa (1986-1990) and Tuvalu (1987-1990).

He became Officer of the Orde van Oranje-Nassau in 1981.

=== Writer ===
As a writer he made his debut in 1951 with the short story de Kanonnen, published in the literary magazine Libertinage. Later he wrote short stories for Hollands Weekblad, Hollands Maandblad and De Gids. He wrote several volumes for Querido. From 1965 he wrote a weekly column for NRC Handelsblad using the name Drievoeter.

== Personal ==
Schneiders was the brother of mayor Frits Schneiders (1923–2002). He married in 1954 Elisabeth “Elleke” Vreede (1924-2014). They had several children together.

He died on 2 July 2020 in Hilversum.

== Bibliography ==
- Langs het schrikdraad (1961)
- Een kater in blik (1963)
- De trek van de struisvogel (1965)
- [as A. Anders] Rapport van de secretarisvogel (1981)
- In de boom (1987)
- Het verbrokkeld paradijs (1991)
