= Luc ter Haar =

Dutch speed skater (born 1993)

Personal information
- Born: December 1993 (age 32) Zeewolde, Flevoland, Netherlands

Sport
- Sport: Marathon speed skating
- Event: Artificial ice
- Coached by: Piet Hijlkema

Luc ter Haar (born December 1993) is a Dutch marathon speed skater whose greatest victory is the 2024 Dutch national title. Ter Haar is known for his strategic and resilient racing style and is a member of the De Haan Westerhoff team.

== Biography ==
Ter Haar was born in Zeewolde, and his interest in speed skating blossomed at a young age. It soon became clear that Ter Haar possessed a talent for the sport, particularly in marathon skating. He was a driven athlete from an early age; unlike many of his peers, who often excelled in sprint races, he found his strength in the longer distances. Marathon skating is a discipline that demands not only physical strength but also tactical insight, an area in which Ter Haar began to specialize.

His professional career in marathon speed skating began with participation in local and regional competitions. Ter Haar soon caught various teams' attention. His performances during these early years were marked by remarkable consistency: he was always near the top, yet often seemed just unable to secure the ultimate victory.

The first and greatest victory of Ter Haar's career came at the Dutch Marathon Skating Championships on artificial ice on 1 January 2024; winning a thrilling race at the Elfstedenhal in Leeuwarden marked a turning point in his career. Ter Haar capitalized on a crash involving several top favourites – including Harm Visser, the race's top contender who had secured numerous victories throughout the season – and ultimately managed to beat his rivals. In the final kilometres, just as the race appeared headed for a mass sprint, Ter Haar positioned himself best and ultimately clinched the win. The crash opened up an opportunity for less-favoured skaters to take the victory. Ter Haar, not typically known for his sprinting prowess, relied instead on his strategic insight and experience. He surged forward in the final metres, defeating the competition in the closing sprint. This triumph also earned him the coveted red-white-and-blue jersey, which he was entitled to wear throughout 2024. It was Ter Haar's first victory on artificial ice. By achieving this at the National Championships, he became the fourth man – after Ton Groot, Henri Ruitenberg, and Peter Baars – to do so.

After this victory, Ter Haar’s future looks promising. His win at the Dutch National Marathon Skating Championships on artificial ice has thrust him into the spotlight as one of the Netherlands' strongest marathon skaters. That same season, Ter Haar won silver at the 2024 Marathon Cup 13, the 2023 Jaap Eden Trophy, and the 2024 Marathon Cup Final.

During the 2024/2025 pre-season, Ter Haar returned to long-track speed skating in classic distances for the first time since 2014, achieving success by setting a personal best in the 3,000 metres: 3:56.29. In the 2024/2025 marathon speed skating season, Ter Haar won his first Marathon Cup by claiming victory in the Marathon Cup 4 race in Heerenveen. During the inaugural edition of De Vier van Noord-Holland in 2024, Ter Haar won the race in Hoorn and took silver in the event's final; this performance secured him third place in the overall standings.

== Personal bests ==
Distance	Time	Date	Track
500 m	38.21	26 December 2012	(Netherlands) Heerenveen
1000 m	1:17.55	2 February 2014	(Netherlands) Heerenveen
1500 m	1:59.11	27 November 2011	(Netherlands) Heerenveen
3000 m	3:56.29	10 December 1979	(Germany) Erfurt
5000 m	7:16.05	18 November 1979	(Netherlands) Heerenveen

== Long-track speed skating results ==
Year	NK distances
2020	9th mass start
2026	4th mass start

== Marathon speed skating results ==
=== 2023/2024 ===
- (gold) Nederlandse kampioenschap marathonschaatsen kunstijs 2024

=== 2024/2025 ===
- 8th Marathon Cup 1; 52e Jaap Eden Trofee 2024
- 4th Marathon Cup 2: Ruiter Dakkapellen Marathon
- 5th Marathon Cup 3; Uithof Bokaal 2024
- (gold) Marathon Cup 4 2024
- 10th Marathon Cup 5; Jan van der Hoorn Schaatssport Marathon
- 4th Marathon Cup 6; Wokke Vastgoed Marathon
- 19th Marathon Cup 7; Royal A-Ware Marathon
- 5th Marathon Cup 8
- 9th De Vier van Noord-Holland 1
- (gold) De Vier van Noord-Holland 2
- 12th De Vier van Noord-Holland 3
- (silver) De Vier van Noord-Holland 4; final

== Marathon teams ==
- 2024/2025: Bouwselect / De Haan Westerhoff
- 2023/2024: Bouwselect / De Haan Westerhoff
- 2022/2023: Bouwselect / Bouwpartners
- 2021/2022: Hoolwerf Heiwerken / AB Vakwerk
- 2020/2021: AB Vakwerk
- 2019/2020: AB Direct
- 2018/2019: AB Direct
- 2017/2018: Opleiding voor B&T
- 2016/2017: Team De Haan Westerhoff
- 2015/2016: Team De Haan Westerhoff
- 2014/2015: Adviesburo Harry de Wolff
- 2013/2014: Adviesburo Harry de Wolff
