= Ton Groot =

Dutch former speed skater (born 1942)

- Sophie Westenbroek (left) and Ton Groot (right) in 1974.

Personal information
- Born: 1942 Limmen, North Holland, Netherlands

Sport
- Sport: Marathon speed skating

Ton Groot (born 1942) is a Dutch former marathon speed skater. He became the Dutch champion on artificial ice in 1974. Furthermore, he won the natural-ice classic Veluwemeertocht in 1979.

== Career ==
Groot occasionally competed in marathon speed skating events, such as the 1972 Jaap Eden Trophy. He did not reach the podium in these races until the 1974 Dutch Marathon Speed Skating Championships on artificial ice. On 16 February 1974, Groot – along with seven others – gained a lap on the field and subsequently left his fellow breakaway riders behind; four laps from the finish, he broke away alone and crossed the finish line solo. Groot expressed his astonishment to De Telegraaf: "How is it possible? How is it possible? I've never won anything before. And now this." Precisely because of this, Groot's title remains remarkable. The North Hollander would never win another marathon on artificial ice. There would be surprising champions in the future – no fewer than twenty-one "one-time" champions – but Groot was unique in that the National Championship was his very first victory on artificial ice; later, René Ruitenberg, Peter Baars, Ineke Kooiman-van Homoet, Rixt Meijer, and Luc ter Haar would also achieve this feat.

During the harsh winter of 1979, the Veluwemeertocht was held twice. In the first race, covering 65 kilometres, Groot finished first on 4 January 1979, ahead of fellow local Jos Niesten from Heemskerk, whom he defeated in the sprint. Three weeks later, the second edition took place, covering a distance of 200 kilometres. That morning, the top two finishers – Groot and Niesten – got into the car together at 5:15am to travel from North Holland to the starting point in Elburg in time. However, they failed to make it owing to the extremely slippery roads. After driving for three and a half hours, they called from Harderwijk to ask for the race to be delayed. Their request was in vain; by the time they arrived in Elburg after an arduous journey, the skaters had already been on the ice for half an hour.

== Marathon speed skating results ==
=== Results in major competitions ===
Year	NK artificial ice	NK natural ice	Jaap Eden Trophy	Alternative Elfstedentocht
1972	4th		5th	
1973			5th	
1974	1st place, gold medalist(s)		6th	7th
1975	12th			7th
1979	19th	5th		

=== Results in natural-ice classics ===
Year	De 100 van Eernewoude	Amstelmeer Marathon	Ronde van Loosdrecht	Rottemeren- tocht	Veluwemeer- tocht
1970			7th		
1979	15th	8th		7th	1st place, gold medalist(s)
1982				9th	
1987					10th

=== Medal table ===
Championship	1st place, gold medalist(s)	2nd place, silver medalist(s)	3rd place, bronze medalist(s)
NK artificial ice	1	0	0
Natural ice classics	1	0	0
Competitions on artificial ice	1	1	1

Sources:

- Profile of Ton Groot at Schaatspeloton.nl
- Profile of Ton Groot at Marathonschaatsenutrecht.nl
