= Limmen =

- Town
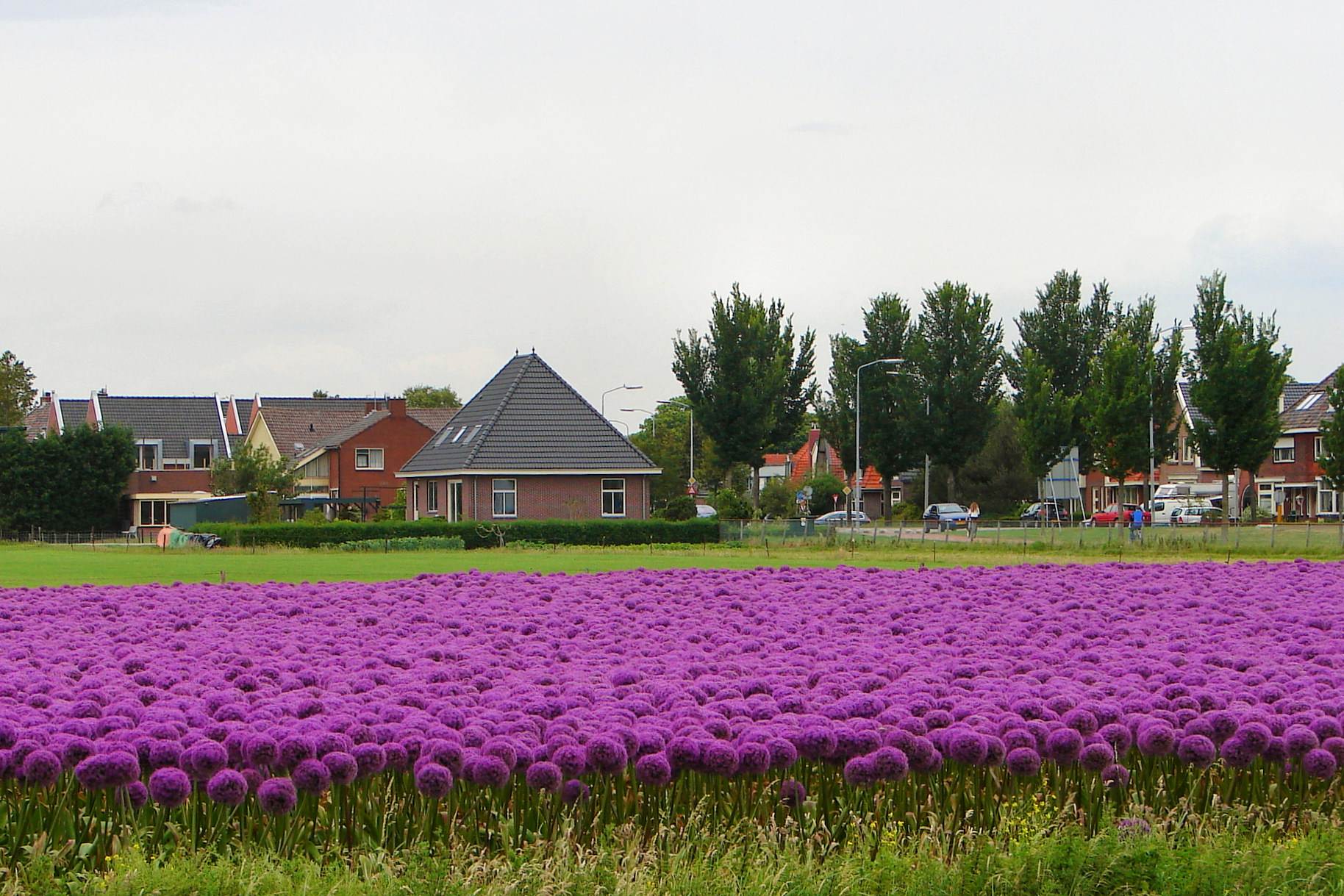

- Coat of arms

- Location in the Netherlands Location in the province of North Holland in the Netherlands
- Coordinates: 52°34′N 4°42′E
- Country: Netherlands
- Province: North Holland
- Municipality: Castricum

Area
  - Total: 9.15 km^{2} (3.53 sq mi)
- Elevation: −0.2 m (−0.66 ft)

Population (2021)
  - Total: 7,635
  - Density: 834/km^{2} (2,160/sq mi)
- Time zone: UTC+1 (CET)
  - Summer (DST): UTC+2 (CEST)
- Postal code: 1906
- Dialing code: 072

Limmen is a town in the Dutch province of North Holland. It is a part of the municipality of Castricum, and is situated about 9 km southwest of Alkmaar. Before 2002 it was a separate municipality.

== History ==
Limmen has been mentioned in various documents since 750, by the name Limbon and later Limmen. It has seen prosperous times, but also times of struggle.

When the people of Limmen became more dependent on agriculture instead of trade at the beginning of the 15th century, the more wealthy moved away. For three centuries Limmen did not develop or grow, despite some efforts made to make the town more attractive. Around the year 1850 Limmen had only 450 inhabitants left.

Limmen was made more accessible in the late 19th century as an effect of the growing Dutch infrastructure, making Limmen a growing town. More work was created, especially by growing bulbs, which made Limmen the so-called "bollencentrum" (bulb-centre) of the northern part of Holland.

== Flower Days ==
The annual "Bloemendagen" (Flower Days) are a tradition in Limmen in the month of May. People living there make mosaics with the flowers of the Hyacinthus orientalis and set up the mosaics in front of their house. People from around the Netherlands come to visit Limmen these days. Bloemendagen Limmen

The village also has a botanical museum, called Hortus Bulborum. This is a collection garden with it 4,000 spring-flowering historical bulbs. This collection consists primarily of tulips, narcissus and hyacinths, but there is also a small number of Fritillaria and crocus, primarily the C.vernus types. In addition to functioning as a gene bank, the garden has a seasonal display of thousands of heirloom bulbs, some of which are no longer in commercial production. Certain tulips originated in the 16th century. https://hortus-bulborum.nl/

== Sister cities ==
- Spitak, Armenia, since 2001.

== Notable people ==
- Ton Groot (born 1942), Dutch speed skater

== Gallery ==
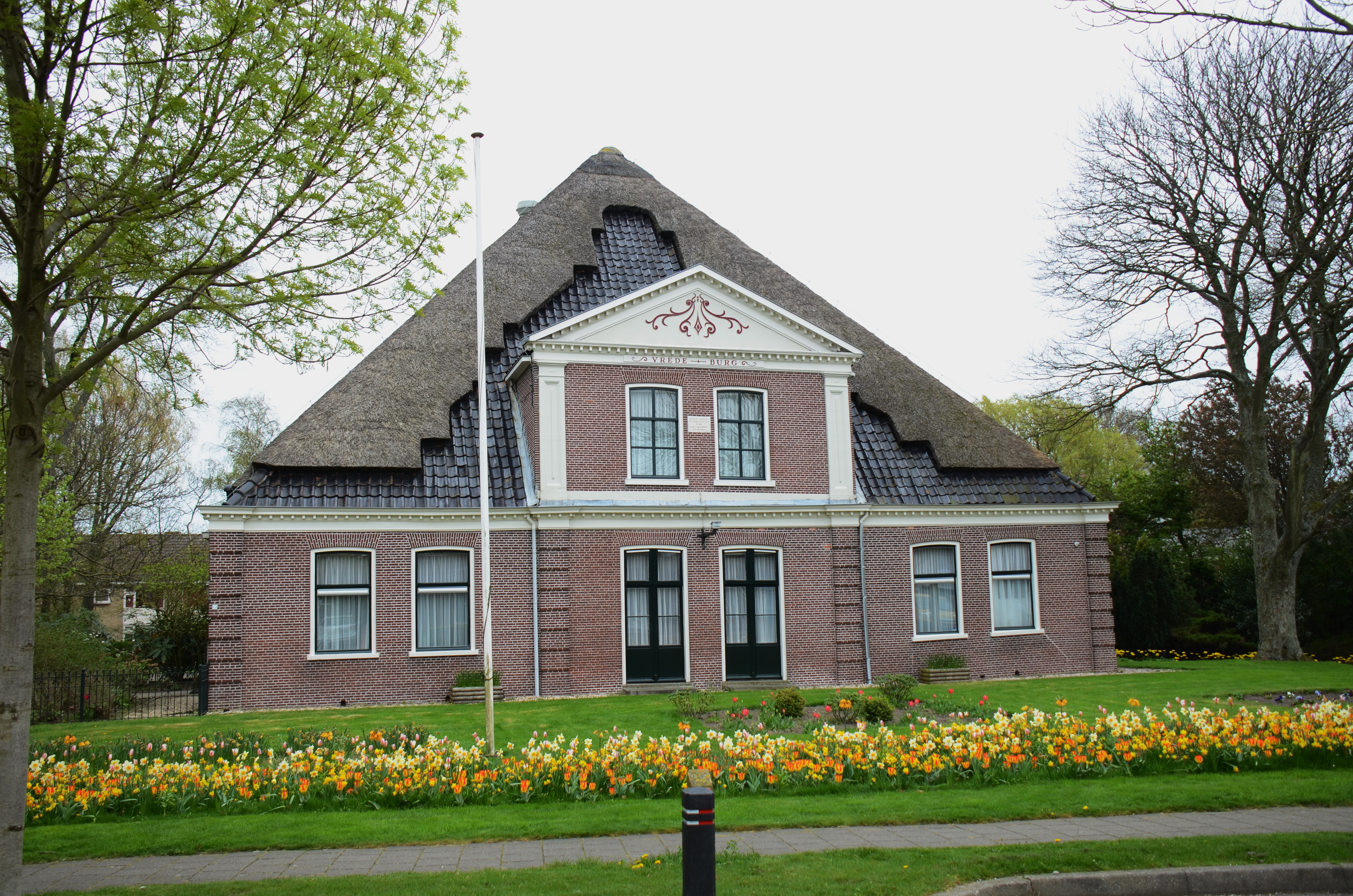
Farm in Limmen

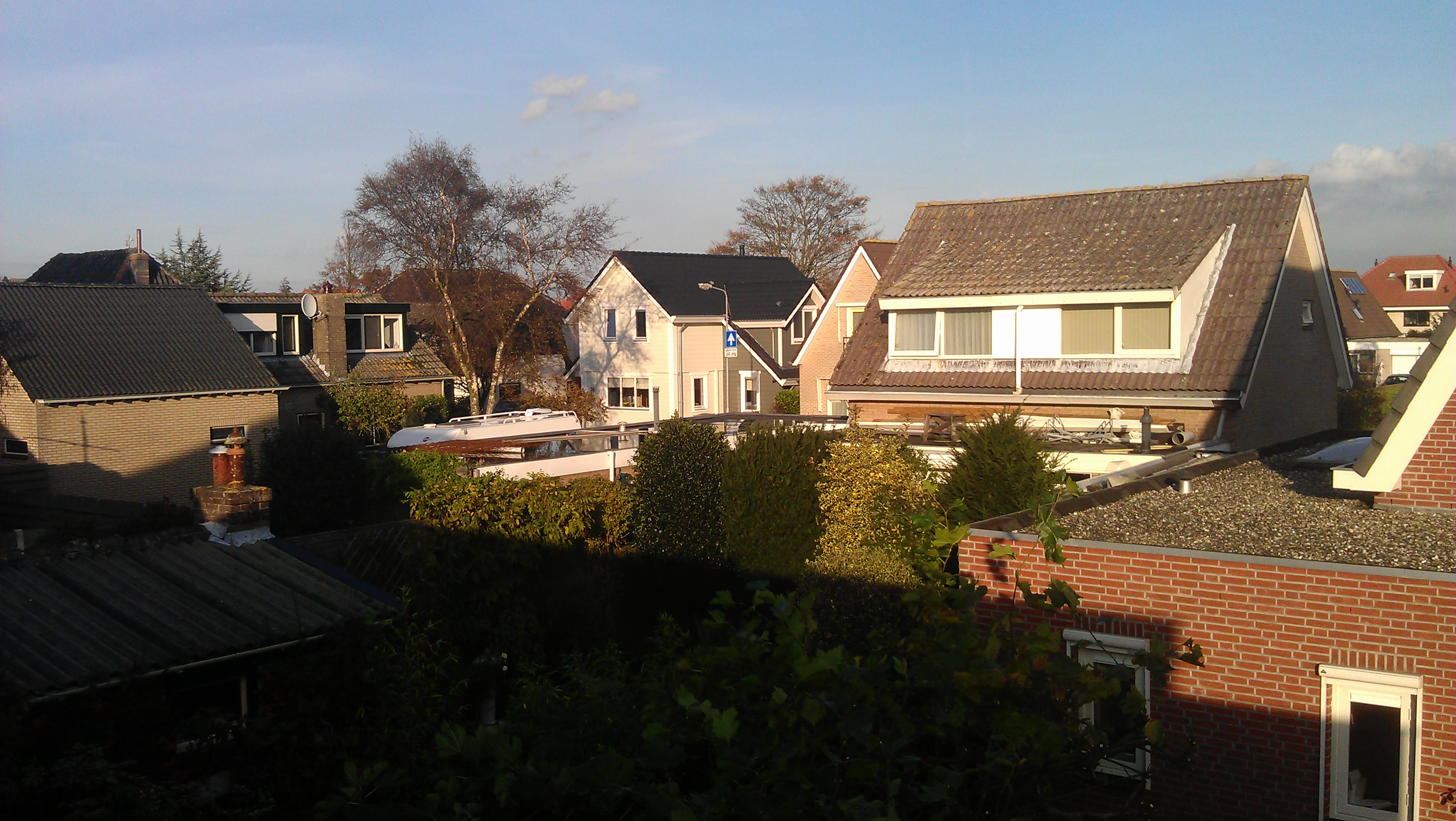
Houses of Limmen

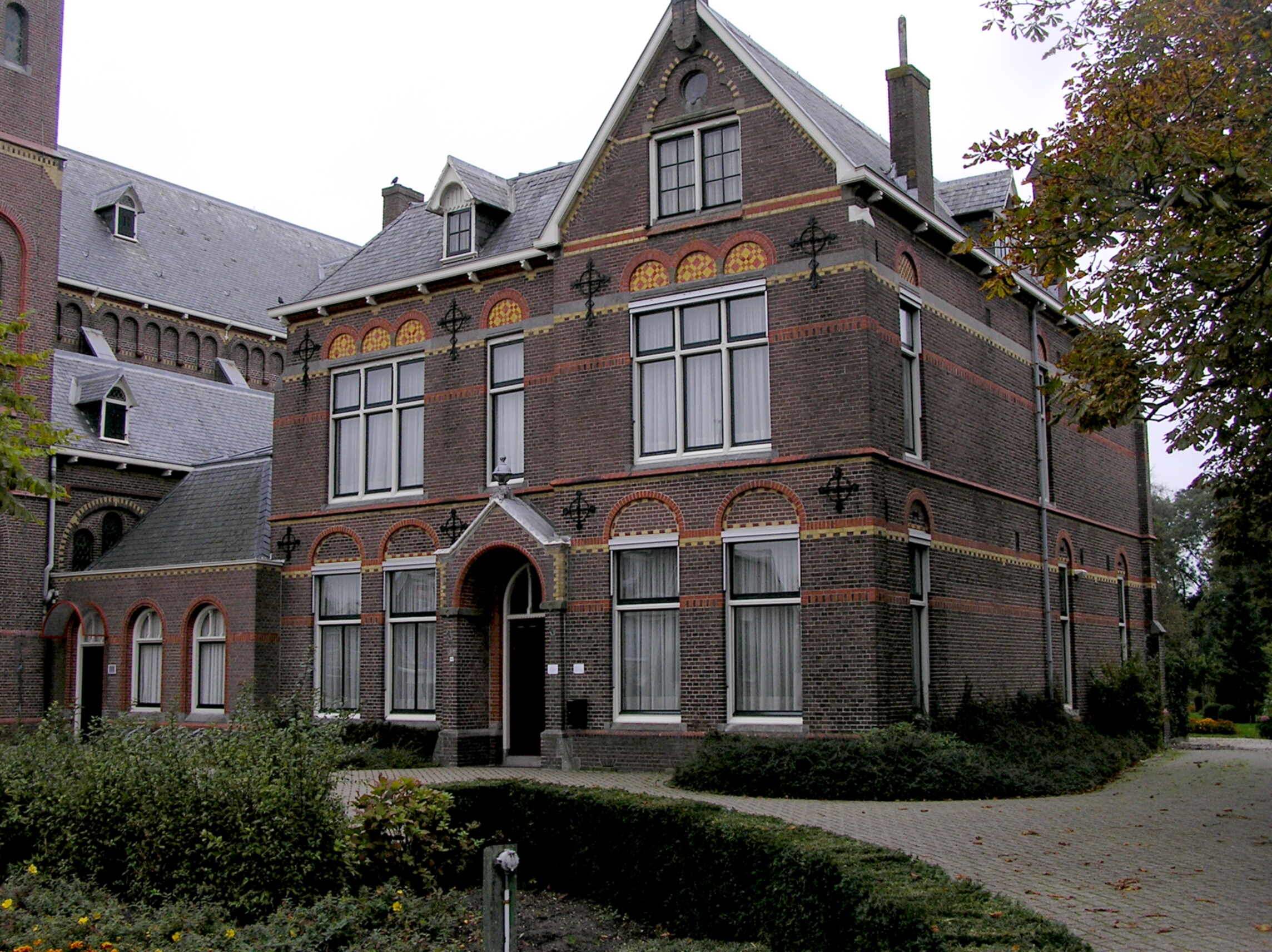
Catholic clergy house

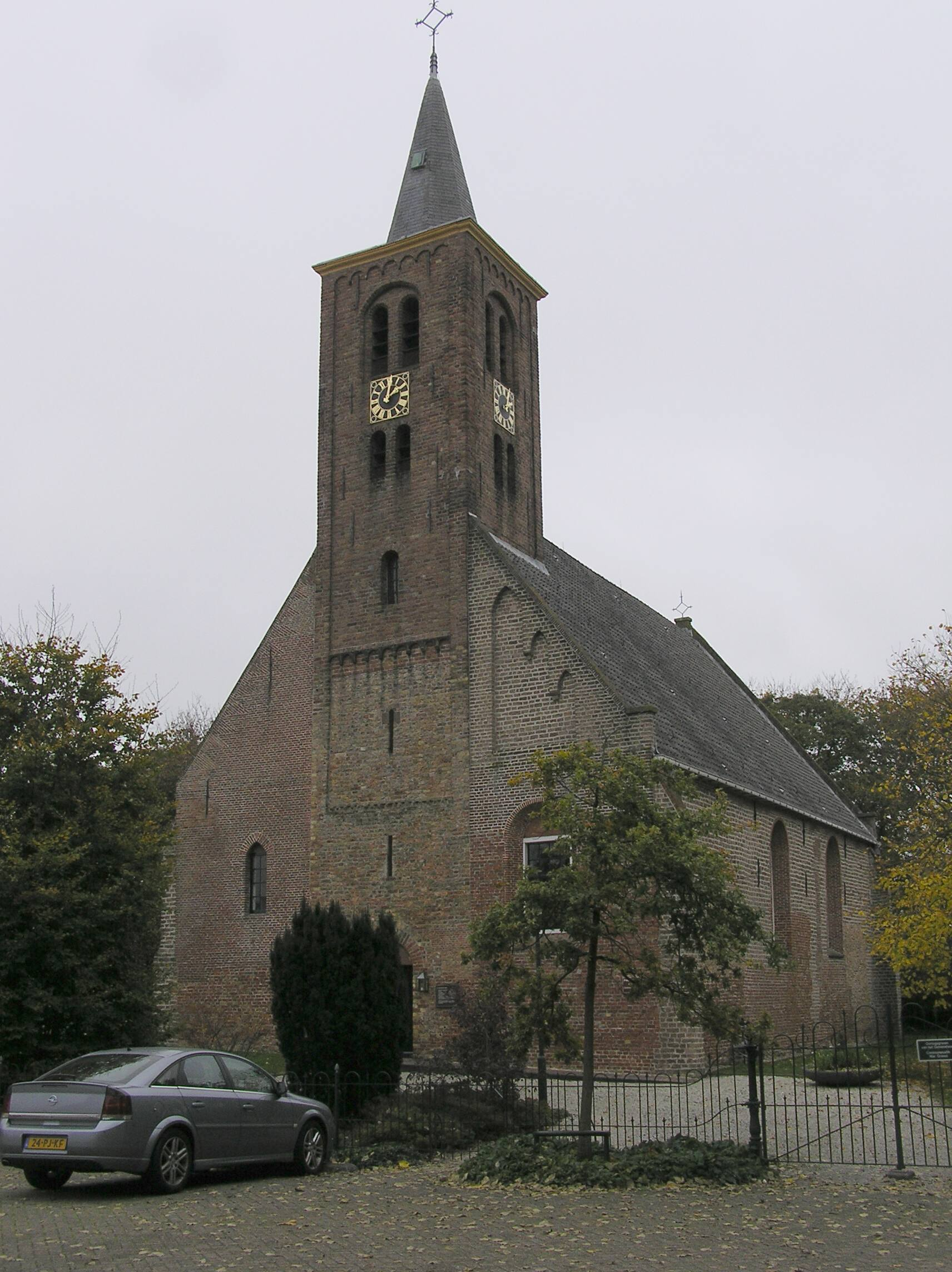
Dutch Reformed church
