= John Ton =

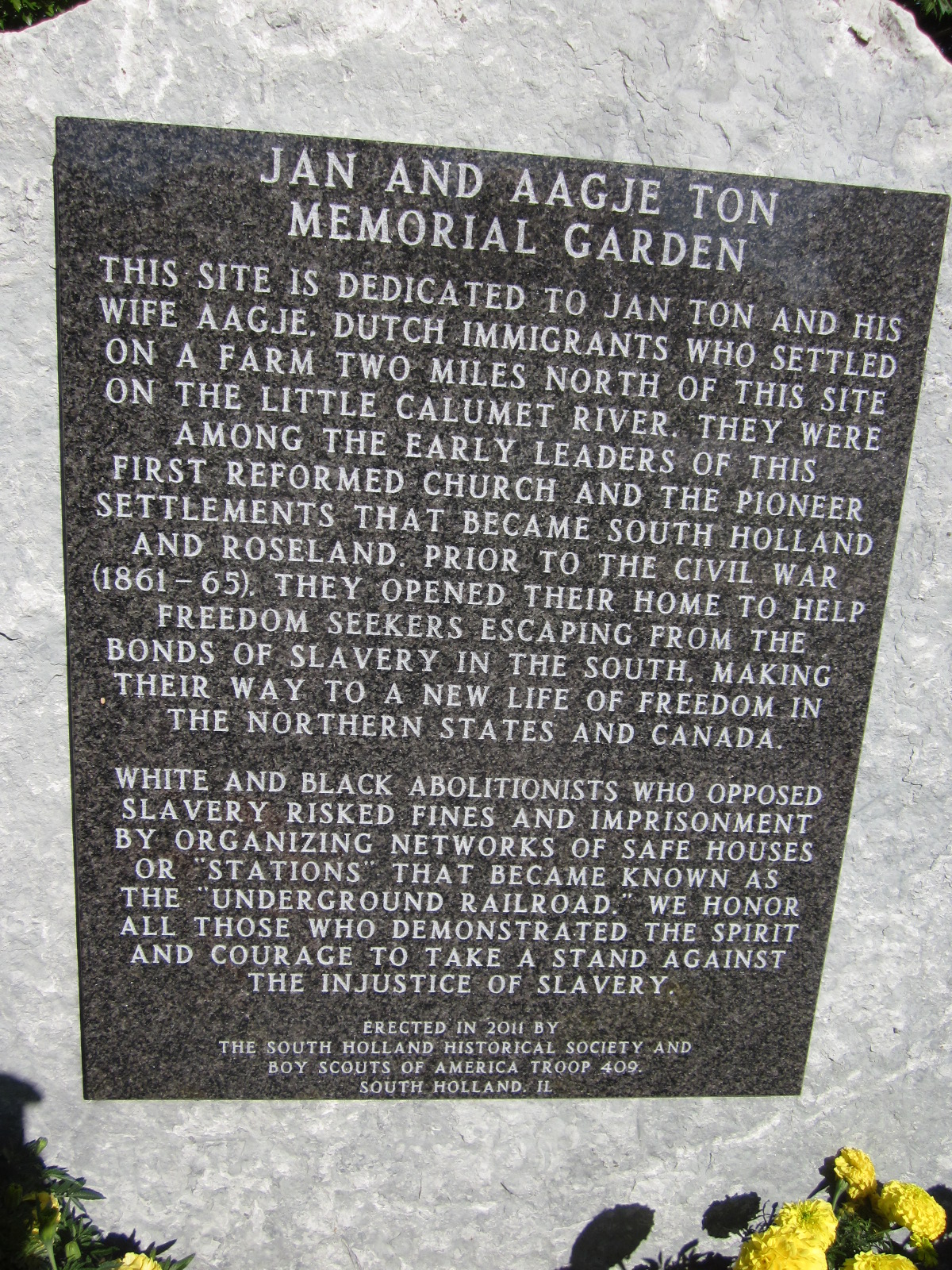
Jan & Aagje Ton UGRR Plaque, South Holland, Illinois

John Ton (born Jan Cornelis Ton; 30 May 1826 in Akersloot, North Holland – 4 June 1896 in Chicago, Illinois) was a Dutch-born American abolitionist active in the Underground Railroad in Illinois.

== Early life ==
Jan Cornelis Ton was born in a village in the province of North Holland north of Amsterdam. He emigrated to America in 1849 with a group of Hollanders seeking a better life in America. They settled in an area about 15 miles (24 km) south of Chicago which they named "High Prairie," now Roseland, Chicago. Ton settled on farmland further south on the north bank of the Calumet River that was owned by the Dalton brothers, Charles and Henry. This land is now part of the Riverdale community. In 1853, he married Aggie Vander Syde, another Dutch immigrant, and began raising a family. In 1859, they purchased the land from the Daltons. Eventually, John and Aggie had 14 children who all survived to adulthood.

John Ton 1826-1896

== Underground Railroad ==
During this time, the country was on the brink of war over the slavery issue. Illinois was a hotbed having a southern border with slave states and leaders such as Abraham Lincoln advocating the abolition of slavery. Having achieved a better life for himself in America, John joined with other abolitionists in the area including Cornelius Kuyper, Charles Dyer, the Dalton brothers, and others to establish a "link" in the Underground Railroad. Fugitive slaves could be hidden at his farm, away from the settlement of Roseland, until safe passage could be arranged to the next underground safe house in Hohman Bridge (Hammond, Indiana) or possibly with a sympathetic ship captain leaving the Port of Chicago for Canada. In 2000, a community group called the Chicago/Calumet Underground Railroad Effort (C/CURE) was established to research and possibly develop the John Ton Farm site.

In 2011, the Jan and Aagje Ton Memorial Garden were established on the grounds of the First Reformed Church in South Holland, Illinois to honor John Ton and all those who supported the underground railroad movement. In 2019, the National Park Service accepted the Jan and Aagje Ton Farm Site to be included in the National Underground Railroad Network to Freedom registry.

Following the War in 1867, John sold the farm on the Calumet River and moved to the north side of Roseland to an area known as Fernwood. He owned 40 acres (160,000 m^{2}) of land (8 city blocks) north of 103rd Street and west of Wentworth. He donated the western edge of this land to the Chicago & Eastern Illinois Railroad to provide commuter rail service to the area from Chicago. In 1893, he built a unique "Dutch Victorian" style home at 316 West 103rd Street.

== Ton Family Reunions ==
Between 1849 and 1865, seven of John's siblings also emigrated to the Roseland area and flourished. Upon his death in 1896, his family including descendants, brothers, sisters and their families held a picnic in his honor. They agreed to make the picnic an annual reunion for the Ton family. In 1911, the Ton Family incorporated for the purpose of keeping the family in closer union and to assure the annual reunions are a permanent and pleasing feature of the Family. Descendants from the eight branches of the Ton Family grew to over 1,000 and the annual picnics became a community celebration that lasted for 60 years. According to Life Magazine, it was once the largest family reunion in American history.
