= Hofje van Oorschot =

Hofje in Haarlem, Netherlands

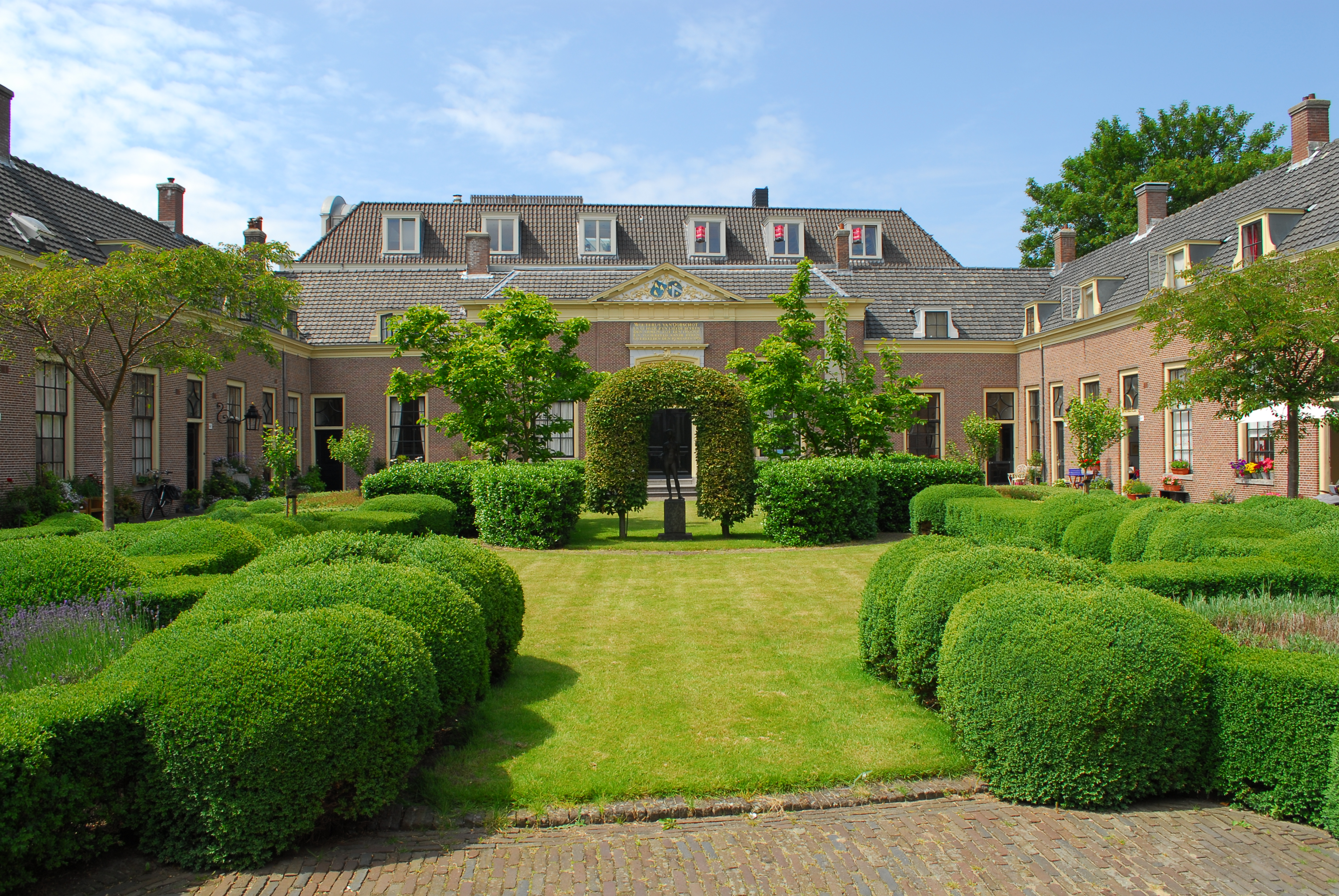
Hofje van Oorschot, view through the gate.

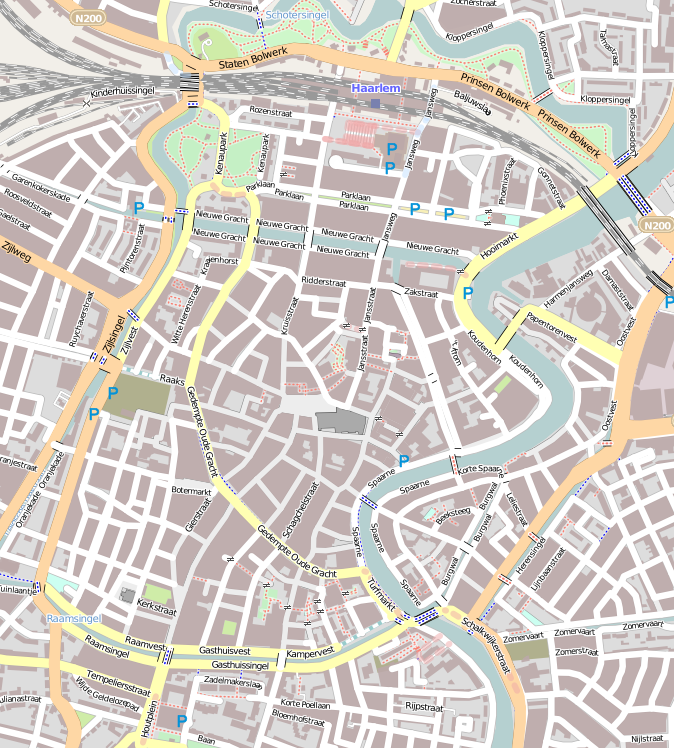
The Hofje van Oorschot is located on the west side of the Kruisstraat where it meets the Barteljoristraat.

The Hofje van Oorschot is a hofje on the Kruisstraat 44 in Haarlem, Netherlands.

== History ==
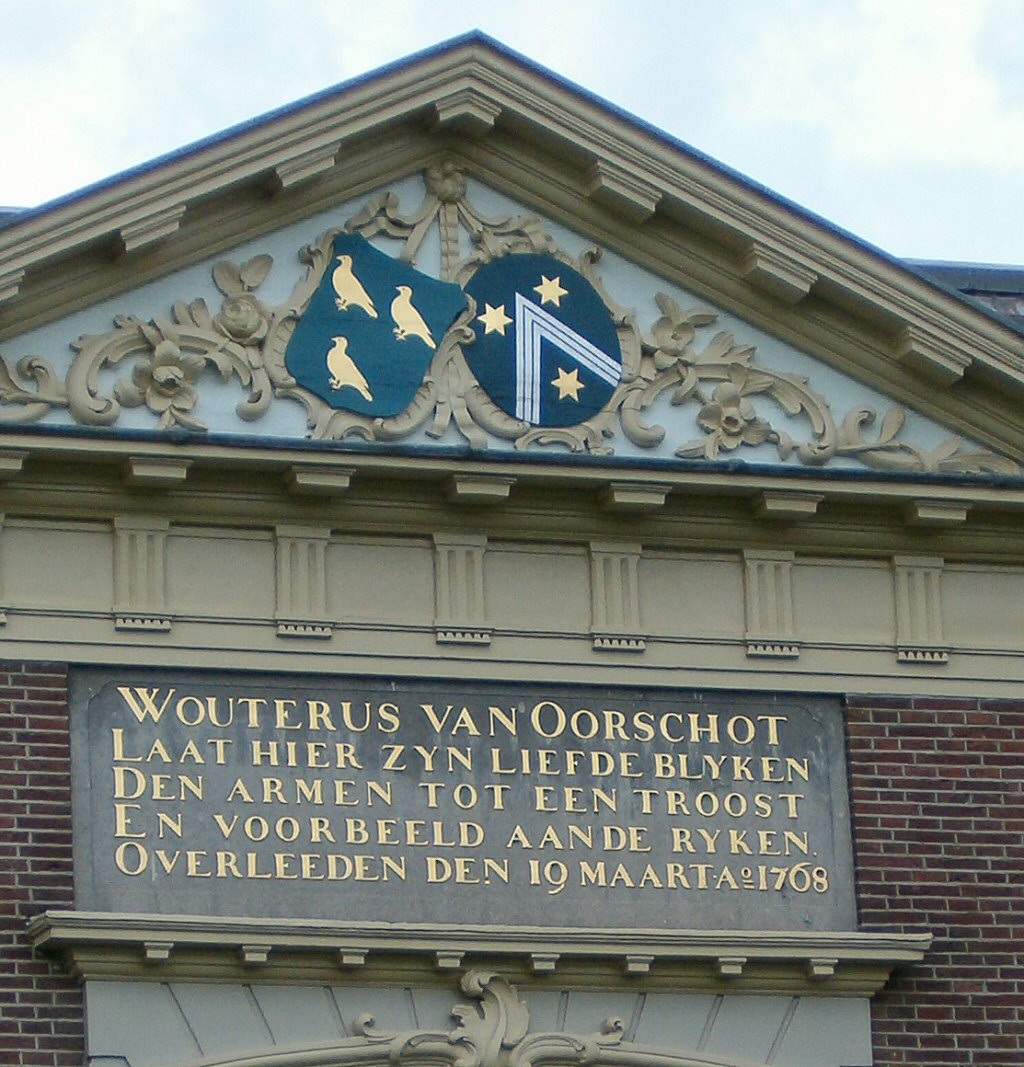
Rooftop poem and family shields of the Oorschot and Savarij families

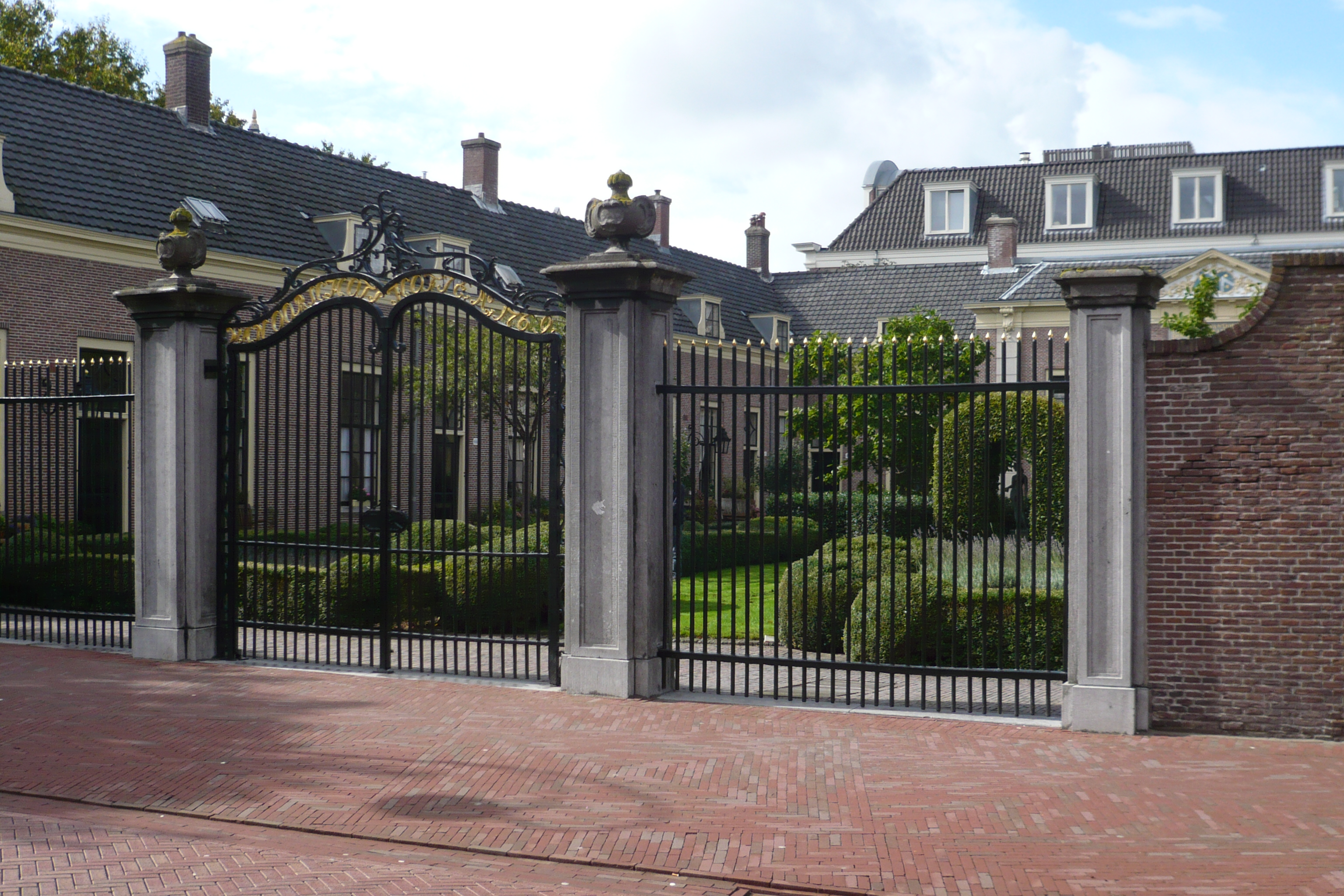
View of the gate.

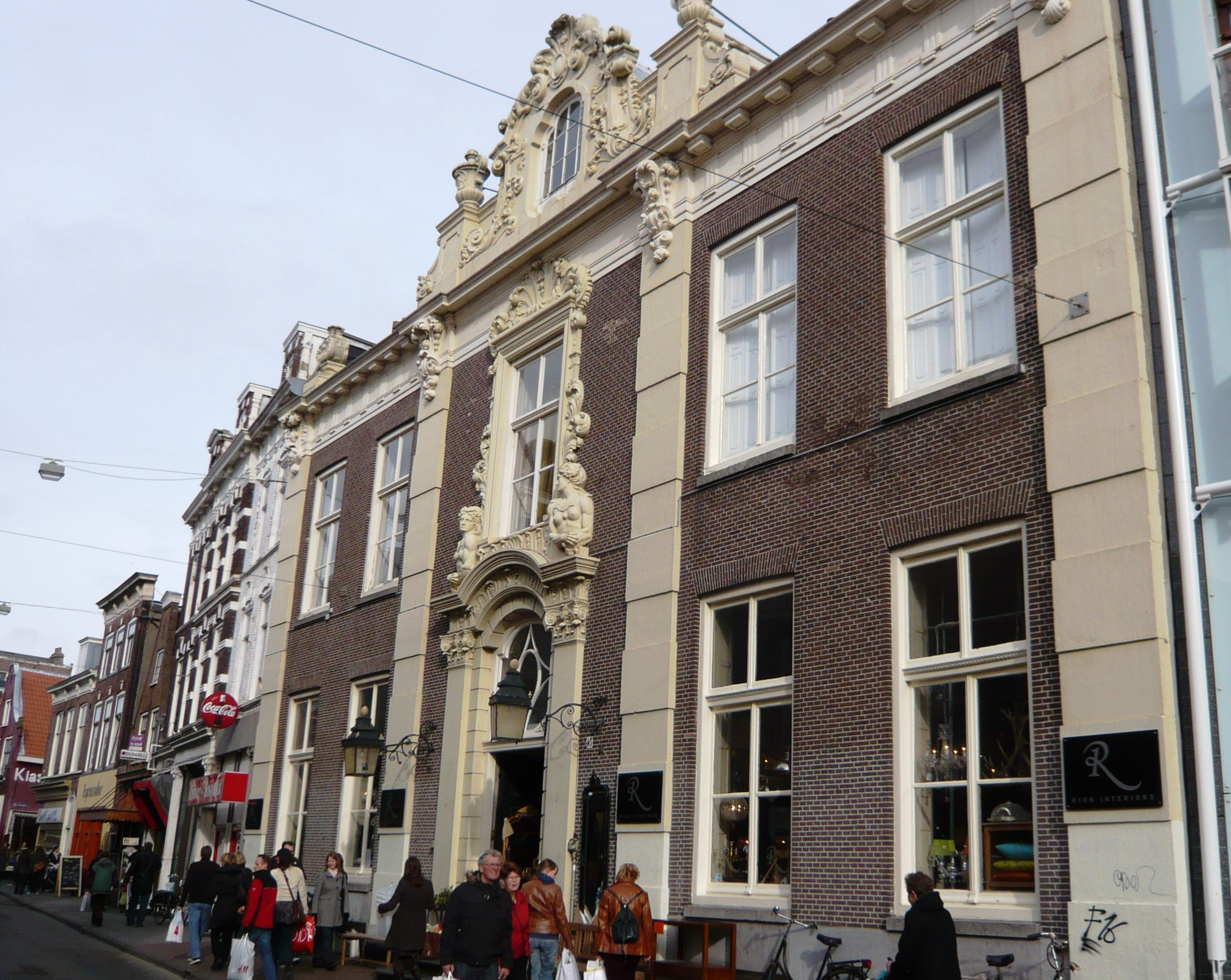
David van Lennep's house across from the hofje.

This hofje was founded upon the death of the donor in 1768 (the date on the memorial plaque on the facade), but wasn't built until 1770, because of demands made by the neighbor on the other side of the street, David Van Lennep. He wanted an attractive view, and organized the commission of the monumental wrought-iron gate that exists today. The donor was Wouterus van Oorschot, a burger of Amsterdam who was born in Dordrecht. He founded the hofje on his death because of his Haarlem roots. His grandfather Levinus Savarij was buried in the St. Bavochurch in grave nr. 142. The family shields of Oorschot and Savary are on display in the top of the facade of the main building, with a small poem which reads "Wouterus van Oorschot shows his love here for the poor and as an example to the rich; died 19 March 1768".

The hofje was built upon the grounds of the former Heilige Geesthuis, an old religious institution like the St. Elisabeth gasthuis that itself was a type of hofje. The will and testament of Van Oorschot had not specified a location, and Van Lennep, himself in the city council, voted against the sale of the land to the hofje founders (executors of Van Oorschot's will). Once the deed was done, Van Lennep managed to have the gate installed, which effectively bars entry to the hofje from the street.

Within the regent's room, the fireplace also has the family shields of Oorschot and Savary.
