= Akersloot =

- Village
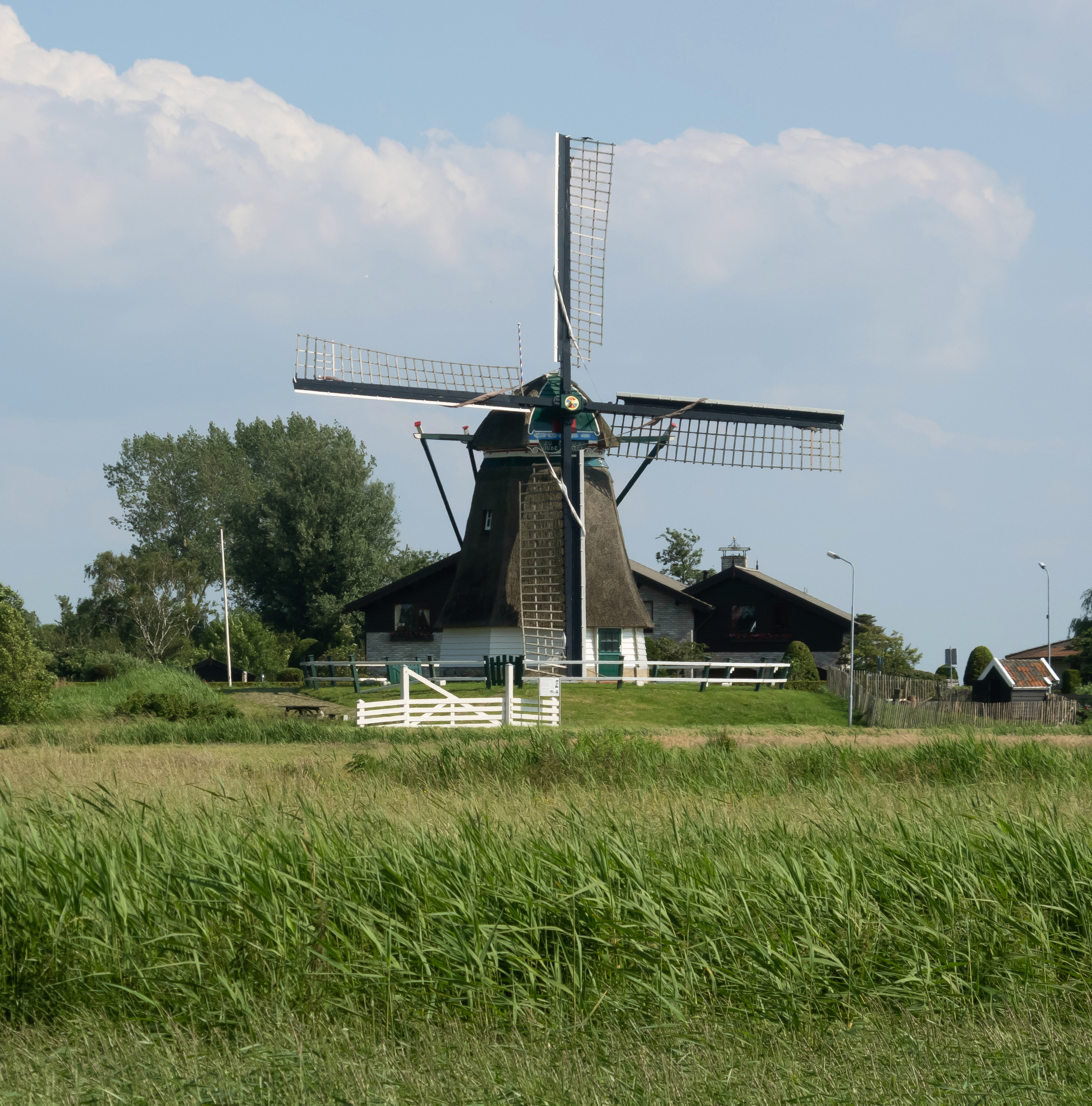
- Windmill: de Oude Knegt

- Coat of arms

- Location in the Netherlands Location in the province of North Holland in the Netherlands
- Coordinates: 52°34′N 4°44′E
- Country: Netherlands
- Province: North Holland
- Municipality: Castricum

Area
  - Total: 10.20 km^{2} (3.94 sq mi)
- Elevation: 0.3 m (0.98 ft)

Population (2021)
  - Total: 5,010
  - Density: 491/km^{2} (1,270/sq mi)
- Time zone: UTC+1 (CET)
  - Summer (DST): UTC+2 (CEST)
- Postal code: 1921
- Dialing code: 0251

Akersloot is a village in the Dutch province of North Holland. It is a part of the municipality of Castricum, and lies about 9 km south of Alkmaar. Until 1 January 2002, Akersloot was a separate municipality.

The oldest name for Akersloot was Axmericota, meaning "Oak Forest at the Sea". In the years between 1250 and 1400, Akersloot gained the title "capital village of Kennemerland". Limmen was the second village in Kennermerland in prestige. In 1276 the people of Akersloot regained their rights and privileges from Count Floris V due to their bravery in the struggle against the Frisians. These privileges were removed by their former lord, the count of Holland, in the early 13th century because they rebelled against him.

Akersloot was razed in October 1573 by retreating Spaniards after the siege of Alkmaar. Several residences and other buildings were burnt to ashes.

After the 80-year war, trade bloomed. Even seafaring and fishery was part of the Akersloot economy.

The Akersloot of today was isolated for a long time. Communication with the outer world was maintained through salon boats of the Alkmaar Packet. After the liberation good bus connections gradually emerged. Akersloot gained a yachting harbor, which now is one of the major ones on the Alkmaardermeer.

A bastion in Galle Fort in Sri Lanka is named Akersloot Bastion which was the birthplace of Willem Jacobszoon Coster who overtook Galle from Protuguess on 13 March 1640.

== Notable person ==
- John Ton, American abolitionist
- Willem Jacobszoon Coster, governor of Dutch Ceylon (now Sri Lanka)
- Fabian Holland ( New Zealand Rugby Player )

== Gallery ==
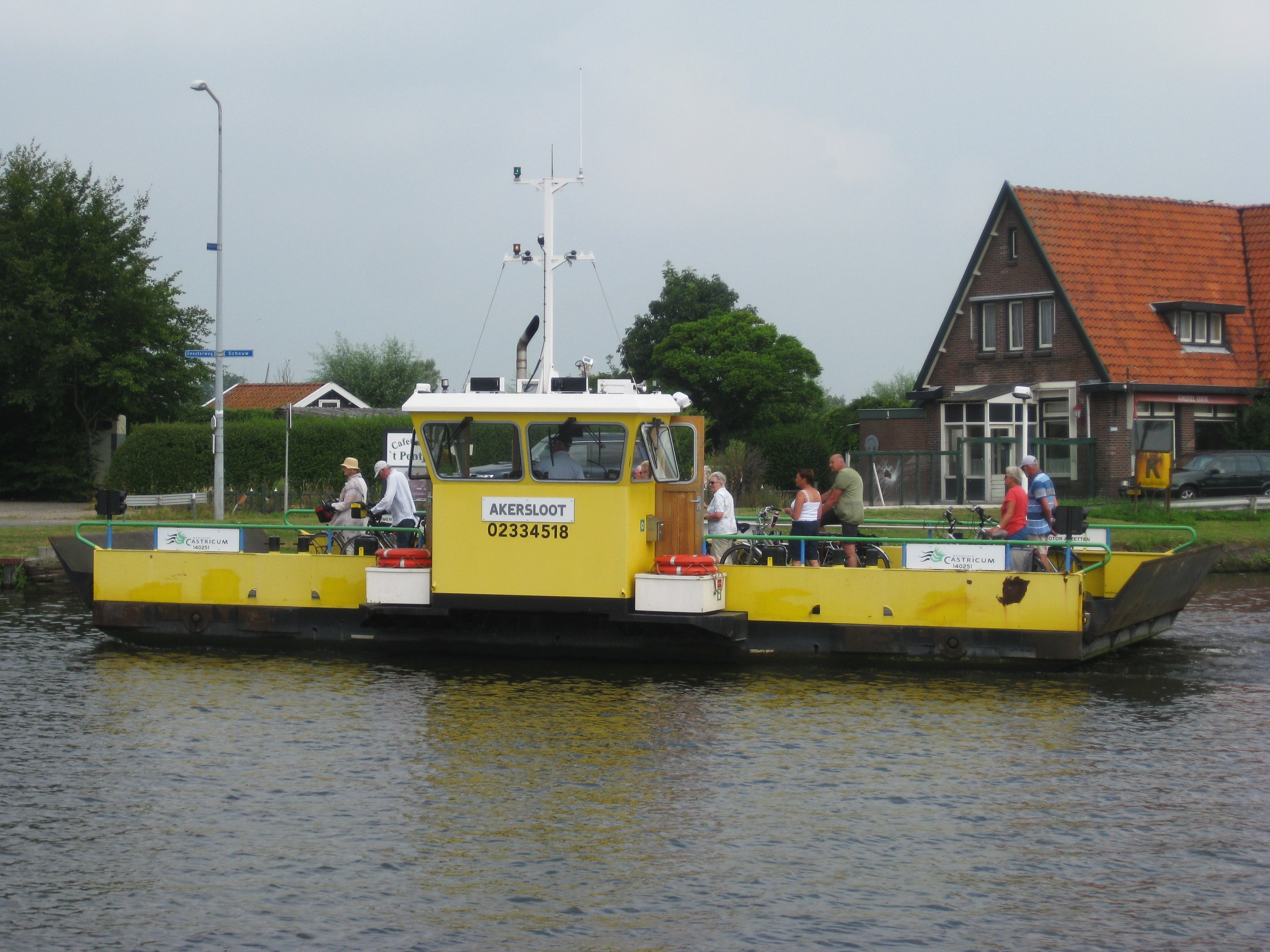
Ferry in Akersloot

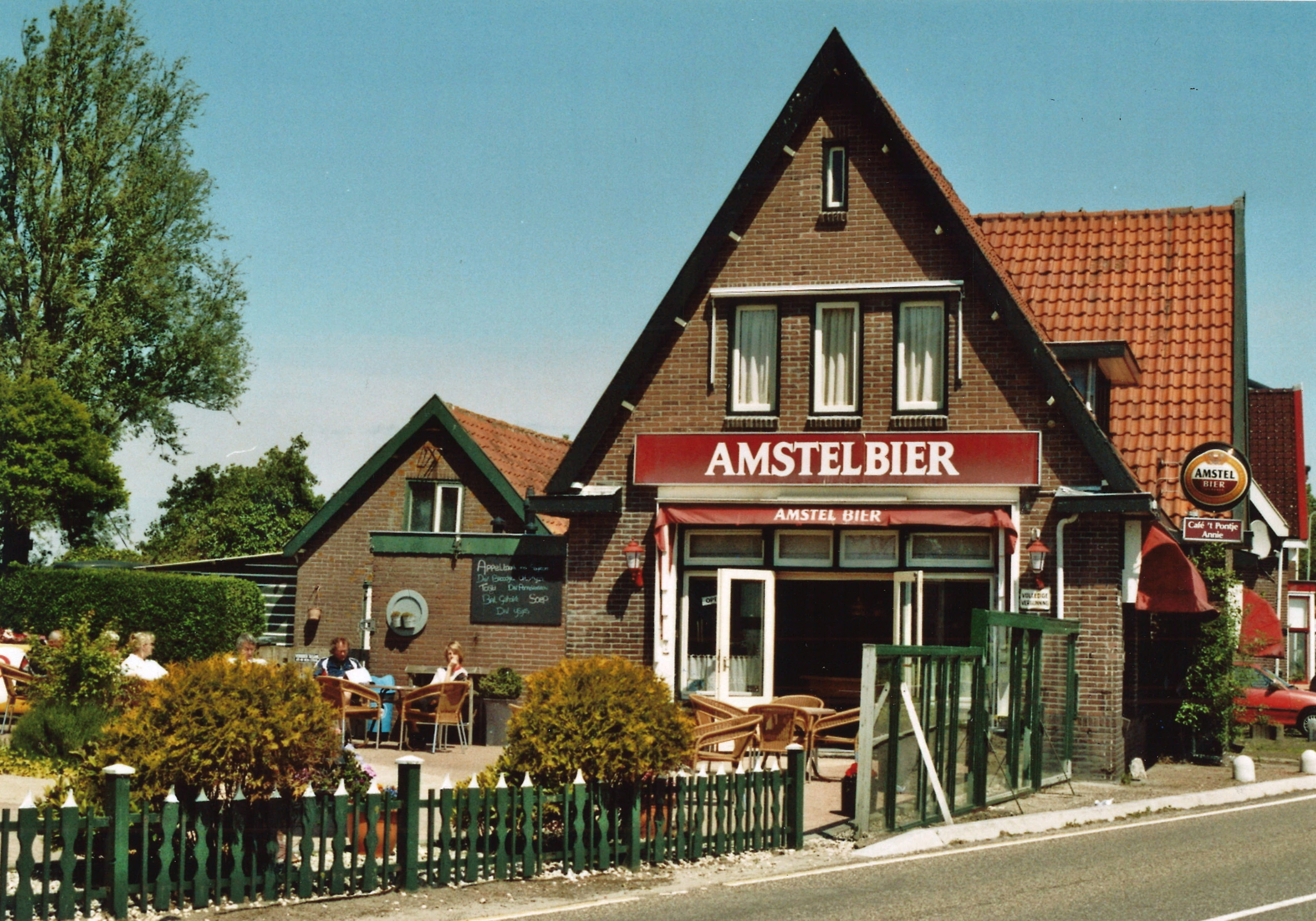
Pub in Akersloot

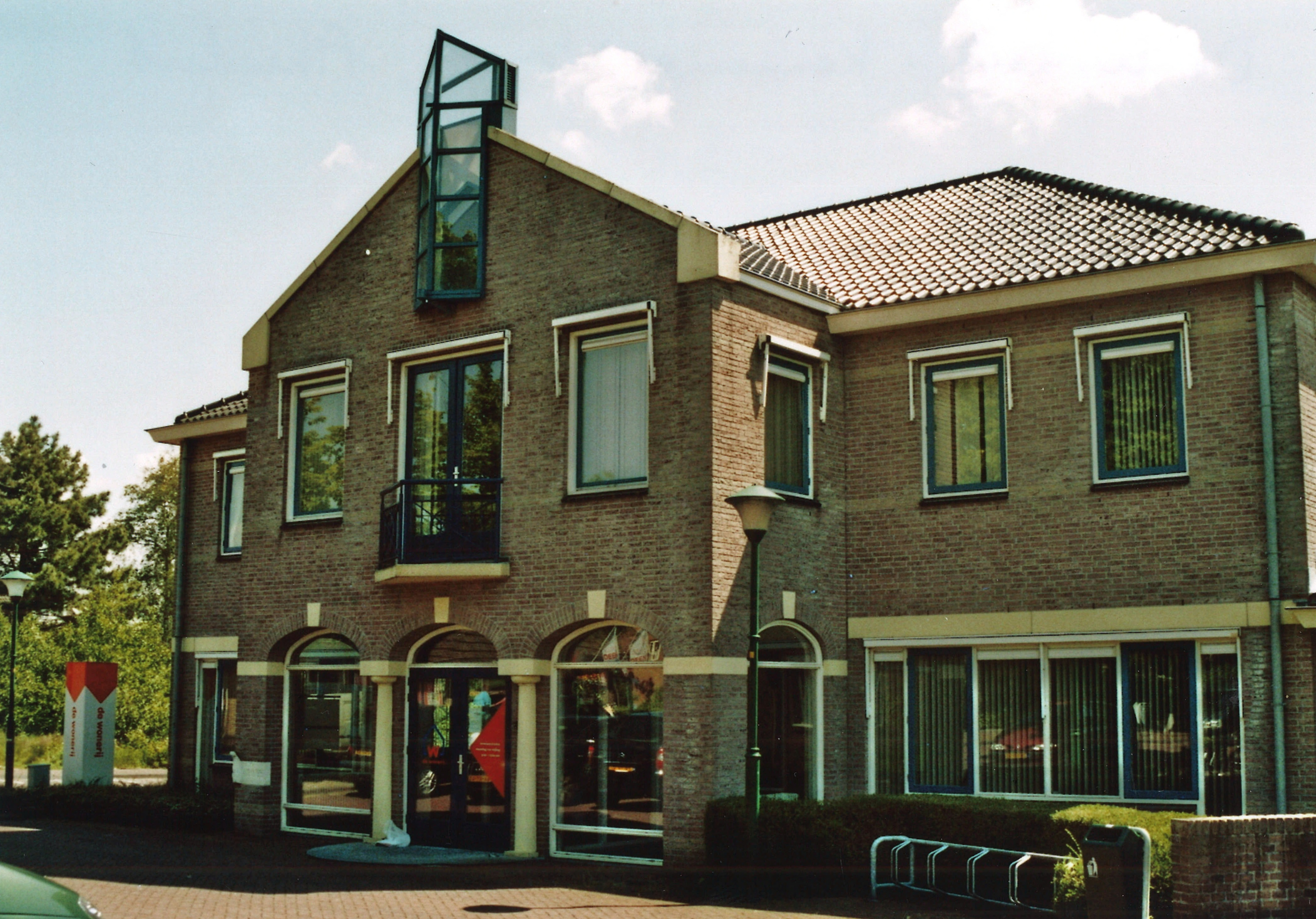
Former town hall in Akersloot

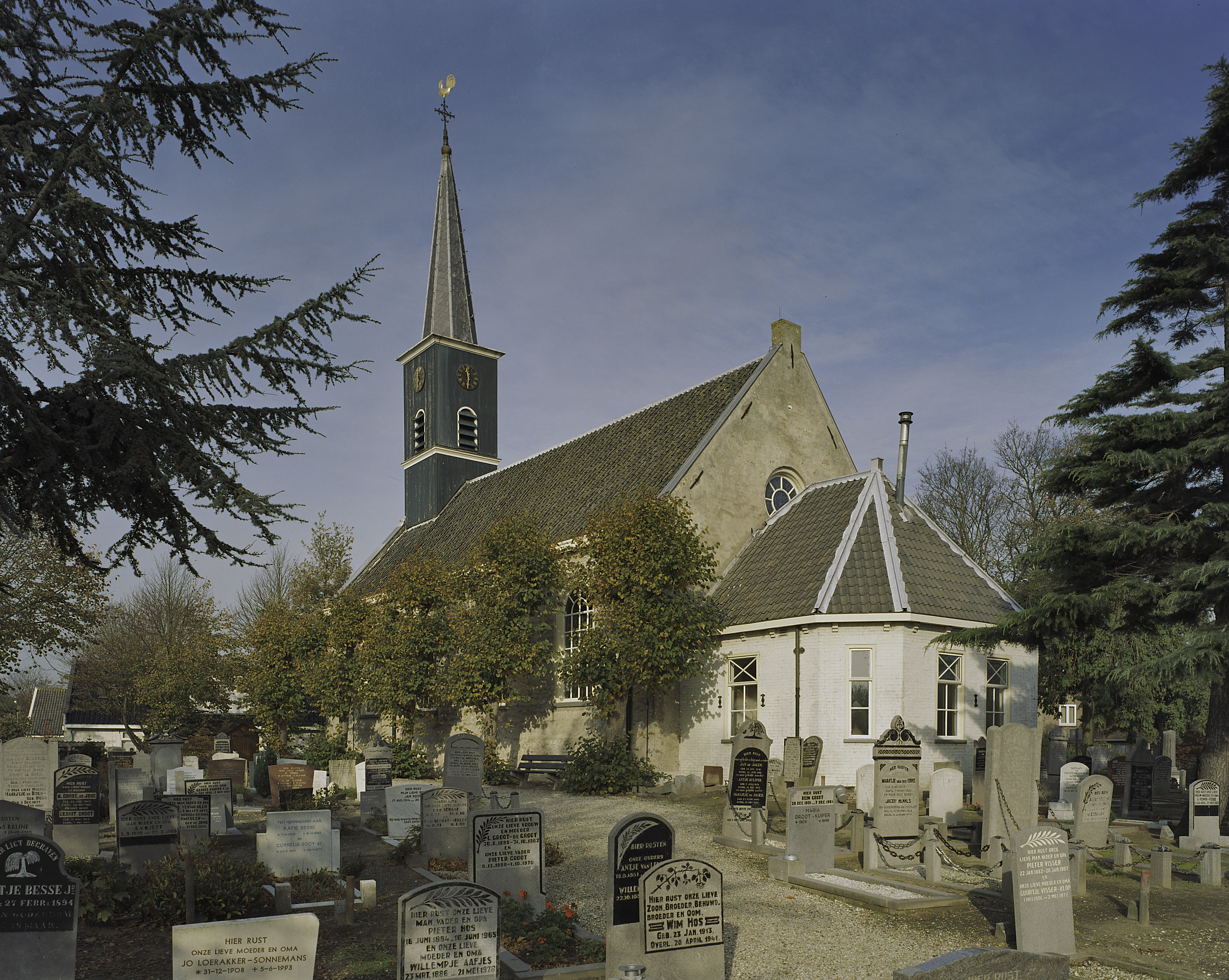
Dutch Reformed church
