= List of Dutch sportspeople =

Dutch sportspeople who are famous or notable include:

== Athletics ==
- Fanny Blankers-Koen (1918–2004)
- Femke Broeders-Bol (born 2000), hurdler, sprinter, and middle-distance runner
- Ellen van Langen (born 1966)
- Churandy Martina (born 1984)
- Tinus Osendarp (1916–2002)
- Dafne Schippers (born 1992)
- Mien Schopman-Klaver (1911–2018)
- Rutger Smith (born 1981)
- Wilma van den Berg (born 1947), sprinter

== Baseball ==
- Loek van Mil (1984–2019)
- Roel de Mon (1919–1973)
- Rick Van den Hurk (born 1985)

== Basketball ==
- Mariska Beijer
- Francisco Elson (born 1976)
- Edwin Engelhart (born 1976)
- Dan Gadzuric (born 1978)
- Rik Smits (born 1966)

== Cycling ==
Mathieu van der Poel

- Dylan van Baarle (born 1992)
- Anna van der Breggen (born 1990)
- Ellen van Dijk (born 1987)
- Tom Dumoulin (born 1990)
- Robert Gesink (born 1986)
- Jan Janssen (born 1940)
- Steven Kruijswijk (born 1987)
- Elis Ligtlee (born 1994)
- Bauke Mollema (born 1986)
- Leontien van Moorsel (born 1970)
- Teun Mulder (born 1981)
- Mathieu van der Poel (born 1995)
- Wout Poels (born 1987)
- Maarten Tjallingii (born 1977)
- Annemiek van Vleuten (born 1982)
- Marianne Vos (born 1987)
- Joop Zoetemelk (born 1946)

=== BMX ===
- Merle van Benthem (born 1992)
- Twan van Gendt (born 1992)
- Jelle van Gorkom (born 1991)
- Niek Kimmann (born 1996)
- Laura Smulders (born 1993)

== Darts ==
- Raymond van Barneveld (born 1967)
- Michael van Gerwen (born 1989)
- Jelle Klaasen (born 1984)

== Fighting ==
=== Boxing ===
- Peter Müllenberg (born 1987)
- Bep van Klaveren (1907–1992)
- Regilio Tuur (born 1967)
- Arnold Vanderlyde (born 1963)

=== Judo ===
- Linda Bolder (born 1988), Israeli-Dutch Olympic judoka
- Edith Bosch (born 1980)
- Dex Elmont (born 1984)
- Anicka van Emden (born 1986)
- Noël van 't End (born 1991)
- Anton Geesink (1934–2010)
- Henk Grol (born 1985)
- Jeroen Mooren (born 1985)
- Kim Polling (born 1991)
- Wim Ruska (1940–2015)
- Marhinde Verkerk (born 1985)

=== Kickboxing ===
- Ernesto Hoost (born 1965)
- Lucia Rijker (born 1967)

=== MMA ===
- Alistair Overeem (born 1980)
- Bas Rutten (born 1965)

=== Wrestling ===
- Jessica Blaszka (born 1992)
- Emil Sitoci (born 1985)
- Aleister Black (born 1985)

== Fencing ==
- Lion van Minden (1880–1944), Olympic fencer who was killed in the Auschwitz concentration camp
- Simon Okker (1881–1944), Olympic fencer killed in the Auschwitz concentration camp

== Football ==
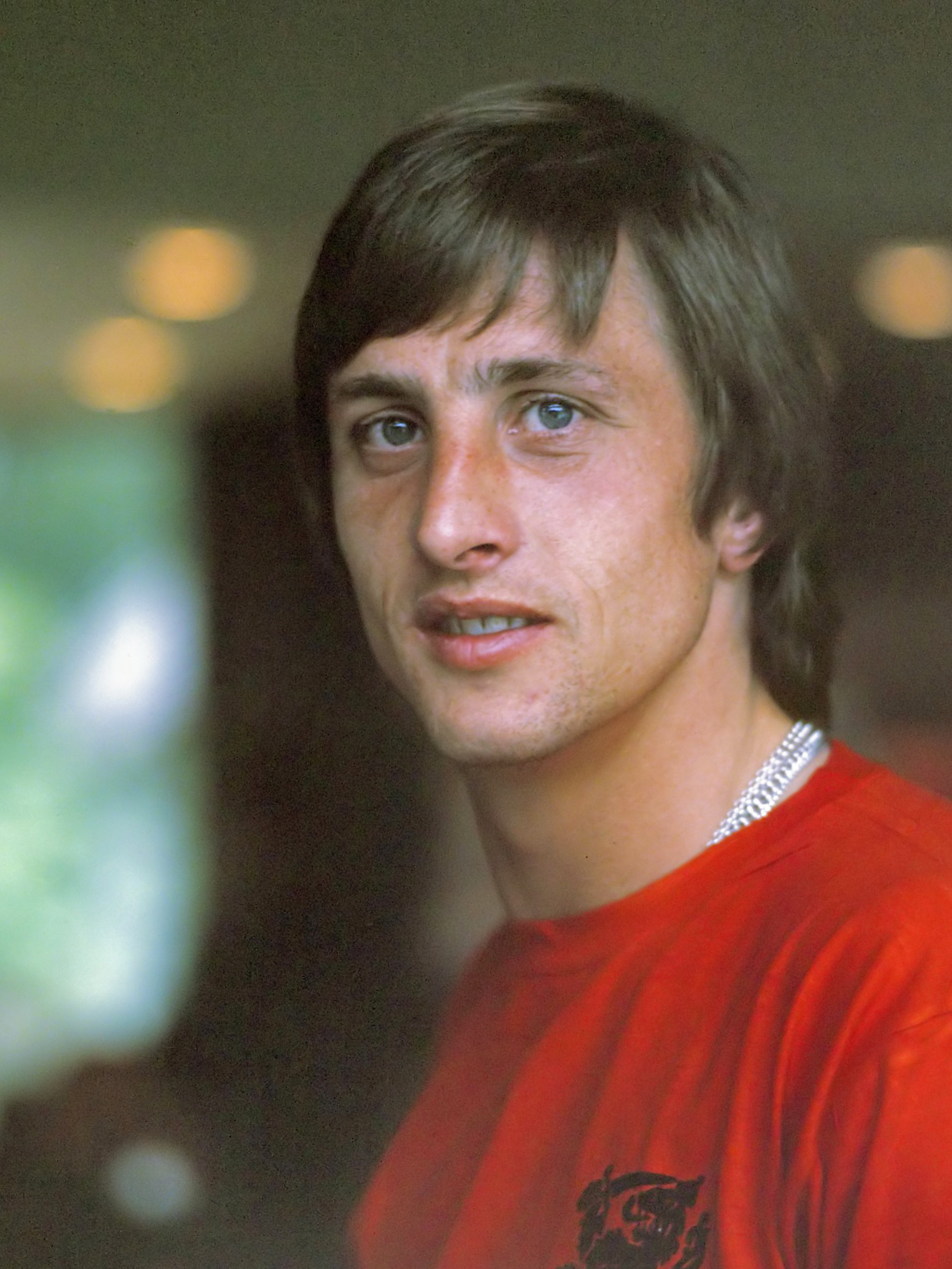
Johan Cruijff

- Nathan Aké (born 1995)
- Ryan Babel (born 1986)
- Marco van Basten (born 1964)
- Dennis Bergkamp (born 1969)
- Frank de Boer (born 1970)
- Ronald de Boer (born 1970)
- Giovanni van Bronckhorst (born 1975)
- Daniël de Ridder (born 1984)
- Roel Buikema (born 1976)
- Johan Cruijff (1947–2016)
- Edgar Davids (born 1973)
- Memphis Depay (born 1994)
- Virgil van Dijk (born 1991)
- Louis van Gaal (born 1951)
- Ruud Gullit (born 1962)
- Eddy Hamel (1902–1943), Jewish-American soccer player for Dutch club AFC Ajax who was killed by the Nazis in Auschwitz concentration camp
- Willem van Hanegem (born 1944)
- Jimmy Floyd Hasselbaink (born 1972)
- John Heitinga (born 1983)
- Guus Hiddink (born 1946)
- Patrick Kluivert (born 1976)
- Ronald Koeman (born 1963)
- Dirk Kuyt (born 1980)
- Bob Mulder (born 1974)
- Dustley Mulder (born 1985)
- Erwin Mulder (born 1989)
- Jan Mulder (born 1945)
- Youri Mulder (born 1969)
- Bennie Muller (1938–2024), footballer
- Ruud van Nistelrooy (born 1976)
- Robin van Persie (born 1983)
- Frank Rijkaard (born 1962)
- Arjen Robben (born 1984)
- Johnny Roeg (1910–2003), striker for Ajax
- Edwin van der Sar (born 1970)
- Clarence Seedorf (born 1976)
- Gerald Sibon (born 1974)
- Wesley Sneijder (born 1984)
- Sjaak Swart (born 1938)
- Gregory van der Wiel (born 1988)
- Bert Aipassa (born 1969)

== Gymnastics ==
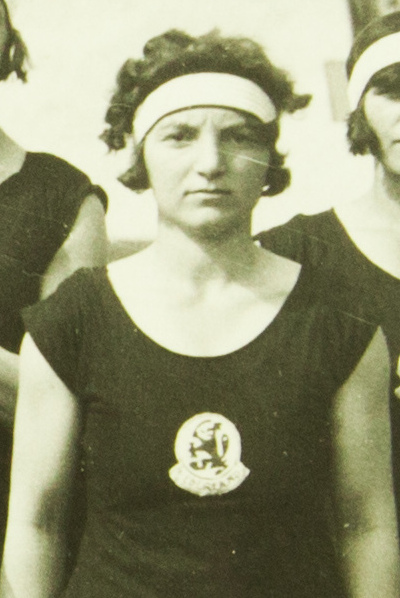
Estella Agsteribbe

- Estella Agsteribbe (1909–1943)
- Bart Deurloo (born 1991)
- Yuri van Gelder (born 1983)
- Céline van Gerner (born 1994)
- Elka de Levie (1905–1979)
- Helena Nordheim (1903–1943)
- Vera van Pol (born 1993)
- Annie Polak (1906–1943)
- Frank Rijken (born 1996)
- Judijke Simons (1904–1943)
- Eythora Thorsdottir (born 1998)
- Jeffrey Wammes (born 1987)
- Lieke Wevers (born 1991)
- Sanne Wevers (born 1991)
- Epke Zonderland (born 1986)

== Hockey ==
=== Field hockey ===
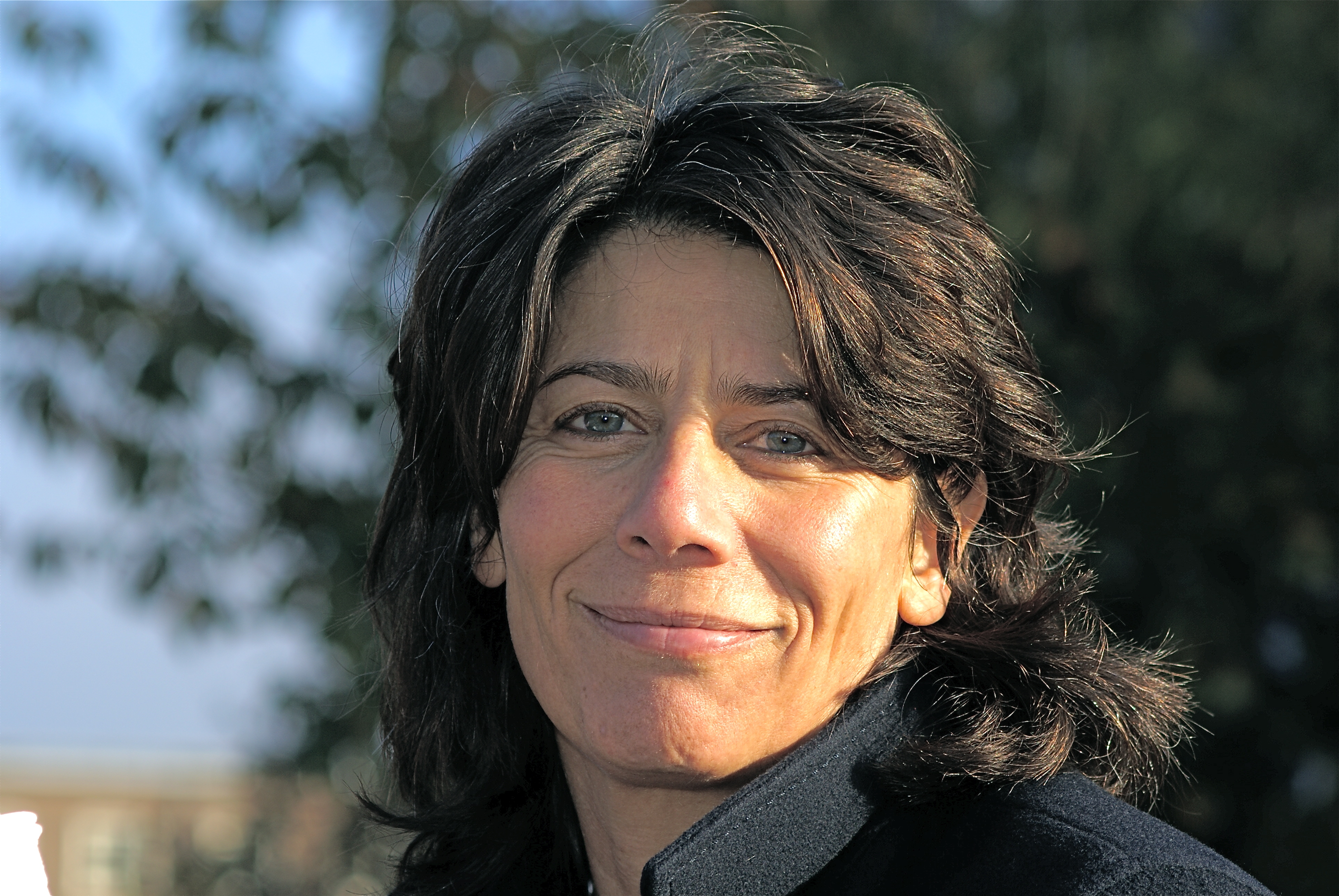
Carina Benninga

- Naomi van As (born 1983)
- Carina Benninga (born 1962)
- Det de Beus (1958–2013)
- Willemijn Bos (born 1988)
- Floris Jan Bovelander (born 1966)
- Jacques Brinkman (born 1966)
- Marc Delissen (born 1965)
- Cees Jan Diepeveen (born 1956)
- Carlien Dirkse van den Heuvel (born 1987)
- Ellen Hoog (born 1986)
- Ties Kruize (born 1952)
- Fatima Moreira de Melo (born 1978)
- Eefke Mulder (born 1977)
- Lau Mulder (1927–2006)
- Teun de Nooijer (born 1976)
- Maartje Paumen (born 1985)
- Taeke Taekema (born 1980)
- Carole Thate (born 1971)

=== Ice hockey ===
- Hans Smalhout (1920–1942)
- Daniel Sprong (born 1997)
- Jim Van der Meer (born 1980)

== Ice skating ==
=== Figure skating ===
- Boyito Mulder (born 1991)
- Sjoukje Dijkstra (born 1942)

=== Speed skating ===
- Lotte van Beek (born 1991)
- Margot Boer (born 1985)
- Jorrit Bergsma (born 1985)
- Jan Blokhuijsen (born 1989)
- Theun Busser (born 1952)
- Lex Cazemier (born 1958)
- Arie Eriks (born 1947)
- Yvonne van Gennip (born 1964)
- Co Giling (born 1950)
- Ton Groot (born 1942)
- Stefan Groothuis (born 1981)
- Lenie van der Hoorn (born 1948)
- Emiel Hopman (1963–2023)
- Jesper Hospes (born 1988)
- Lammert Huitema (born 1961)
- Bob de Jong (born 1976)
- Rein Jonker (born 1950)
- Richard van Kempen (born 1964)
- Rhian Ket (born 1983)
- Pien Keulstra (born 1993)
- Carien Kleibeuker (born 1978)
- Sven Kramer (born 1986)
- Jan Eise Kromkamp (born 1955)
- Jan Roelof Kruithof (1936–2026)
- Marrit Leenstra (born 1989)
- Rixt Meijer (born 1982)
- Jorien ter Mors (born 1989)
- Michel Mulder (born 1986)
- Ronald Mulder (born 1986)
- Jos Niesten (born 1945)
- Henk Portengen (born 1948)
- Rintje Ritsma (born 1970)
- Gianni Romme (born 1973)
- Henri Ruitenberg (born 1957)
- René Ruitenberg (born 1970)
- Ard Schenk (born 1944)
- Klasina Seinstra (born 1968)
- Jan Smeekens (born 1985)
- Yuri Solinger (born 1979)
- Arnold Stam (born 1968)
- Jan Uitham (1925–2019)
- Jochem Uytdehaage (born 1976)
- Bart Veldkamp (born 1967)
- Kees Verkerk (born 1942)
- Koen Verweij (born 1990)
- Klaas Vriend (1952–2019)
- Foske Tamar van der Wal (born 1986)
- Johan Wardenier (born 1942)
- Bennie van der Weide (born 1947)
- Dries van Wijhe (born 1945)
- Ireen Wüst (born 1986)

=== Short-track speed skating ===
- Sjinkie Knegt (born 1989)

== Racing ==
- Jeroen Bleekemolen (born 1981)
- Sebastiaan Bleekemolen (born 1978)
- Nick de Bruijn (born 1987)
- Yelmer Buurman (born 1987)
- Colin Caresani (born 2003)
- Nicky Catsburg (born 1988)
- Tim Coronel (born 1972)
- Tom Coronel (born 1972)
- Indy Dontje (born 1992)
- Stef Dusseldorp (born 1989)
- Ricardo van der Ende (born 1979)
- Liane Engeman (1947–2026)
- Cor Euser (born 1957)
- Robin Frijns (born 1991)
- Robert de Haan (born 2006)
- Wil Hartog (born 1948)
- Laura van den Hengel (born 1991)
- Laurens van Hoepen (born 2005)
- Dilano van 't Hoff (2004–2023)
- Duncan Huisman (born 1971)
- Patrick Huisman (born 1966)
- Thomas Hylkema (born 1988)
- Mex Jansen (born 2006)
- Daniël de Jong (born 1992)
- Niels Koolen (born 2001)
- Sepp Koster (born 1974)
- Peter Kox (born 1964)
- Danny Kroes (born 1999)
- Dennis van de Laar (born 1994)
- René Lammers (born 2008)
- Shirley van der Lof (born 1986)
- Arie Luyendyk (born 1953)
- Arie Luyendyk Jr. (born 1981)
- Paul Meijer (born 1985)
- Nigel Melker (born 1991)
- Maxime Oosten (born 2003)
- Jarno Opmeer (born 2000)
- Nicky Pastorelli (born 1983)
- Dirk Schouten (born 2001)
- Morris Schuring (born 2005)
- Jeroen Slaghekke (born 1992)
- Rinus VeeKay (born 2000)
- Thierry Vermeulen (born 2002)
- Richard Verschoor (born 2000)
- Beitske Visser (born 1995)
- Hans Weijs (born 1986)
- Renger van der Zande (born 1986)

=== Formula 1 ===
Max Verstappen

- Christijan Albers (born 1979)
- Carel Godin de Beaufort (1934–1964)
- Michael Bleekemolen (born 1949)
- Robert Doornbos (born 1981)
- Jan Flinterman (1919–1992)
- Giedo van der Garde (born 1985)
- Boy Hayje (born 1949)
- Jan Lammers (born 1956)
- Bas Leinders (born 1975)
- Gijs van Lennep (born 1942)
- Dries van der Lof (1919–1990)
- Ben Pon (1936–2019)
- Huub Rothengatter (born 1954)
- Rob Slotemaker (1929-1979)
- Jos Verstappen (born 1972)
- Max Verstappen (born 1997)
- Nyck de Vries (born 1995)
- Roelof Wunderink (born 1948)

== Rowing ==
- Chantal Achterberg (born 1985)
- Claudia Belderbos (born 1985)
- Carline Bouw (born 1984)
- Roel Braas (born 1987)
- Annemiek de Haan (born 1981)
- Sytske de Groot (born 1986)
- Nienke Kingma (born 1982)
- Anne Schellekens (born 1986)
- Roline Repelaer van Driel (born 1984)
- Jacobine Veenhoven (born 1984)

== Swimming ==
- Inge de Bruijn (born 1974)
- Pieter van den Hoogenband (born 1978)
- Ada Kok (born 1947)
- Ranomi Kromowidjojo (born 1990)
- Rie Mastenbroek (1919–2003)
- Petra van Staveren (born 1966)
- Marleen Veldhuis (born 1979)
- Marcel Wouda (born 1972)

== Tennis ==
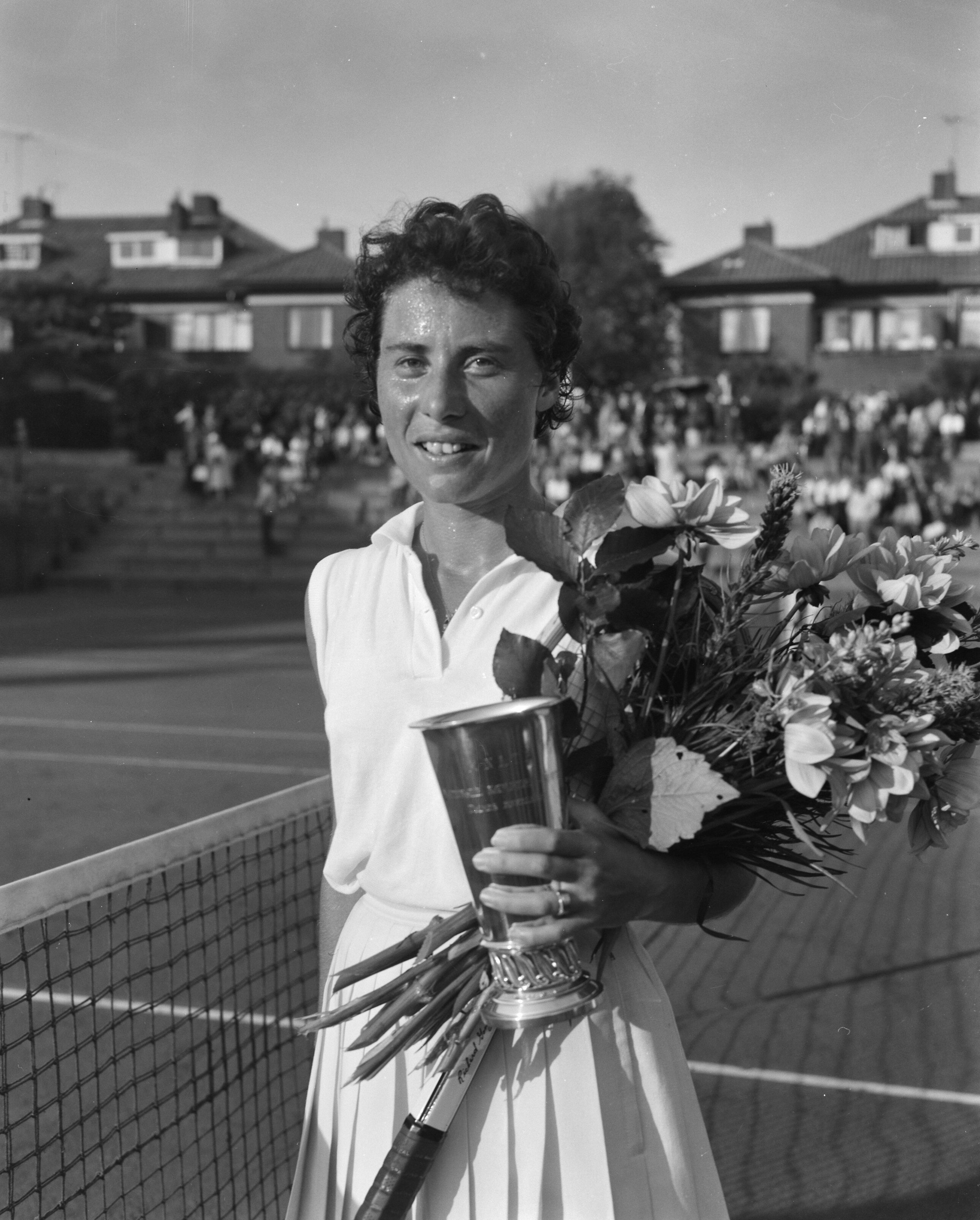
Eva Duldig

- Kiki Bertens (born 1991)
- Eva Duldig (born 1938)
- Jacco Eltingh (born 1970)
- Paul Haarhuis (born 1966)
- Robin Haase (born 1987)
- Michaëlla Krajicek (born 1989)
- Richard Krajicek (born 1971)
- Stephen Noteboom (born 1969)
- Tom Okker (born 1944)
- Betty Stöve (born 1945)
- Martin Verkerk (born 1978)
- Niels Vink (born 2002), champion wheelchair tennis player

== Triathlon ==
- Maya Kingma (born 1995)
- Rachel Klamer (born 1990)

== Volleyball ==
=== Indoor volleyball ===
- Yvon Beliën (born 1993)
- Anne Buijs (born 1991)
- Laura Dijkema (born 1990)
- Maret Grothues (born 1988)
- Robin de Kruijf (born 1991)
- Judith Pietersen (born 1989)
- Celeste Plak (born 1995)
- Myrthe Schoot (born 1988)
- Lonneke Slöetjes (born 1990)
- Debby Stam (born 1984)
- Quinta Steenbergen (born 1985)
- Femke Stoltenborg (born 1991)

=== Beach volleyball ===
- Alexander Brouwer (born 1989)
- Sophie van Gestel (born 1991)
- Marleen van Iersel (born 1988)
- Robert Meeuwsen (born 1988)
- Madelein Meppelink (born 1989)
- Reinder Nummerdor (born 1976)
- Christiaan Varenhorst (born 1990)
- Jantine van der Vlist (born 1985)

== Water polo ==
- Stan van Belkum (born 1961)
- Mart Bras (born 1950)
- Ton Buunk (born 1952)
- Nico Landeweerd (born 1954)
- Hans Wouda (born 1941)

== Weightlifting ==
- Ingrid Teeuwen (born 1981)
