= Theun Busser =

Dutch former speed skater (born 1952)

Personal information
- Nickname: De Walrus
- Born: 10 December 1952 (age 73) Appelscha, Friesland, Netherlands
- Years active: 1978–1990

Sport
- Sport: Long-track speed skating Marathon speed skating
- Events: 5000-metre 10000-metre All-round natural ice

Theun Busser (born 10 December 1952) is a Dutch former marathon speed skater who finished fifth in the 1985 Elfstedentocht. Further, he won the Alternative Elfstedentocht twice (in 1985 and 1986) and earned three medals at the Dutch National Championships on artificial ice.

== Career ==
Busser was the first to cross the finish line after the lead group, which included the winner, Evert van Benthem, who won the sprint against Henri Ruitenberg, Jos Niesten, and Jan Kooiman. He finished 2 minutes and 23 seconds behind the lead group. Wim Westerveld crossed the line two seconds after him. He himself was disappointed with his fifth-place finish, which he attributed in part to a minor muscle injury. "At the start, I tore a small muscle in my leg," Busser said of the incident. "It held me back", I couldn't put in the necessary burst of effort, and as a result, I missed the decisive move."

Busser's nickname was "the Walrus", owing to the style of his moustache. He was not fond of skating on artificial ice rinks. "Regarding this former conscientious objector of Frisian descent, the story goes that he is too lazy to train and only shows up at the artificial ice rink when he needs to take a shower," Het Vrije Volk wrote about him in 1985. "In a winter like this one, however, training outdoors happens quite naturally, and Busser is getting into better shape than usual."

On 16 February 1985 – five days before the thirteenth Elfstedentocht – Busser won a speed skating marathon on artificial ice in his hometown of Utrecht. He finished ahead of Jan Kooiman (third) and Evert van Benthem (fifth), thereby besting two skaters who would go on to be part of the lead group in Leeuwarden.

On 2 March 1985, nine days after the "Tour of Tours" (de Tocht der Tochten, that is, the Elfstedentocht), Busser won the Alternative Elfstedentocht on Kallavesi, near the Finnish city of Kuopio. He defeated Jan Kooiman in the final sprint. Their finishing time was more than five minutes faster than what they had managed in the actual Elfstedentocht, a difference arising from the Finnish venue's lack of as much need for the participants to walk or klune. Busser viewed his victory as a form of redemption for his disappointing fifth-place finish in the "real" Elfstedentocht. Evert van Benthem, the winner of that race, did not participate in the alternative event. Henri Ruitenberg, who dropped out of the race, and his backup man, Kees Poel, criticized Van Benthem for his absence, arguing that it showed a lack of sportsmanship. They later apologized for this, stating: "In hindsight, we realized that Van Benthem made the right decision not to start here. This event followed too closely on the heels of the one in Friesland."

During Busser's skating career, he was also a professional window dresser.

== Records ==
=== Personal bests ===
| Distance | Time | Date | Track |
|---|---|---|---|
| 500 m | 40.60 | 13 December 1981 | (Netherlands) Alkmaar |
| 1000 m | 1:22.20 | 22 December 1982 | (Germany) Inzell |
| 1500 m | 2:03.70 | 3 March 1978 | (Germany) Inzell |
| 3000 m | 4:21.80 | 4 January 1978 | (Germany) Inzell |
| 5000 m | 7:30.22 | 3 March 1978 | (Germany) Inzell |
| 10 000 m | 15:38.10 | 22 February 1980 | (Germany) Inzell |

== Long-track speed skating results ==
| Year | NK All-round | WK Juniors |
|---|---|---|
| 1978 | | 14th (19th, 8th, 17th, 12th) |
| 1979 | NC17 (12th, 19th, 18th, –) | |
| 1980 | NC14 (9th, 13th, 12th, –) | |

(#, #, #, #) = distance ranking at an all-round tournament (500 m, 5000 m, 1500 m, 10 000 m). Juniors: (500 m, 3000 m, 1500 m, 5000 m).

== Marathon speed skating results ==
=== Results in major competitions ===
| Year | NK artificial ice | NK natural ice | WK natural ice (unofficial) | Jaap Eden Trophy | KNSB Cup standing | Heineken Zesdaagse | Alternative Elfstedentocht | Elfstedentocht |
|---|---|---|---|---|---|---|---|---|
| 1980 | 10th | | | 6th | | | | |
| 1981 | 6th | | | 10th | 8th | | 12th | |
| 1982 | 3rd place, bronze medalist(s) | | | | 9th | | 3rd place, bronze medalist(s) | |
| 1983 | 9th | | | 7th | 7th | 11th | | |
| 1984 | 3rd place, bronze medalist(s) | | | | 7th | 10th | 12th | |
| 1985 | 2nd place, silver medalist(s) | 14th | | 9th | 12th | 6th | 1st place, gold medalist(s) | 5th |
| 1986 | | 15th | | | 20th | | 1st place, gold medalist(s) | 25th |
| 1987 | | | | | | 33rd | 14th | |
| 1988 | | | | | | | 14th | |
| 1990 | | | 14th | | | | 17th | |

=== Results in natural-ice classics ===
| Year | De 100 van Eernewoude | Amstelmeer Marathon | Driedaagse van Ankeveen | Noorder Rondritten | Oldambt- rit | Rottemeren- tocht |
|---|---|---|---|---|---|---|
| 1980 | 7th | | | | 7th | |
| 1986 | | | 5th | | | 4th |
| 1987 | | 17th | | 10th | 14th | |

=== Medal table ===
| Championship | Gold (gold) | Silver (silver) | Bronze (bronze) |
|---|---|---|---|
| NK artificial ice | 0 | 1 | 2 |
| Alternative Elfstedentocht | 2 | 0 | 1 |
| Races on artificial ice | 6 | 8 | 9 |

Sources:

- Profile of Theun Busser at Schaatspeloton.nl
- Profile of Theun Busser at Marathonschaatsenutrecht.nl
- Profile of Theun Busser at Schaatsstatistieken.nl
