= Jan Kooiman =

Dutch former speed skater (born 1953)

- Jan Kooiman (1986)

Personal information
- Born: 9 February 1953 (age 73) Ammerstol, South Holland, Netherlands
- Years active: 1978–1997

Sport
- Sport: Marathon speed skating
- Events: Long distances Marathons
- Club: STV Lekstreek

Jan Kooiman (born 9 February 1953) is a Dutch former long-track and marathon speed skater. He was the Dutch marathon champion three times (in 1982, 1983, and 1986) and won the Royal Dutch Skating Federation (Koninklijke Nederlandsche Schaatsenrijders Bond; KNSB) Cup standings in 1982. He held the world one-hour record from March 1983 to November 1986 and won the Alternative Elfstedentocht in 1987 and 1993.

== Career ==
=== Early years ===
Kooiman came from a farming family in the village of Ammerstol in the Krimpenerwaard region of eastern South Holland. He started out as a long-track speed skater. In 1974, he became the regional champion of South Holland. After marrying Ineke van Homoet in 1976, he scaled back his training for a year to undertake a renovation of their house. Once the renovation was complete, he resumed intensive training. In February 1978, he participated in the Dutch All-round Championships, where he finished in tenth place. His best performance was a seventh-place finish in the 10-kilometre event. A year later, he switched to marathon speed skating. He made his début on 3 November 1979, at the Jaap Eden Trophy, the season opener, finishing fourth.

=== Period of success ===
Kooiman preferred artificial ice over natural ice. On 13 February 1982, he won his first national marathon title at De Uithof in The Hague. That same year, he also won the KNSB Cup overall standings. In 1983, he successfully defended his national marathon title at the De Meent ice rink in Alkmaar. He finished second in the KNSB Cup that year, behind winner Henk Portengen. Kooiman's peak years were in the earlier half of the 1980s. On 8 March 1983, he made a successful attempt on the world one-hour record at the ice rink in Inzell, Germany. He bested the two-year-old record held by Jos Niesten and became the first skater to surpass the 38-kilometre mark. The new record distance of 38,558.45 metres stood for nearly four years, until Hilbert van der Duim broke the record on 28 November 1986, also in Inzell, with a distance of 39,492.80 metres.

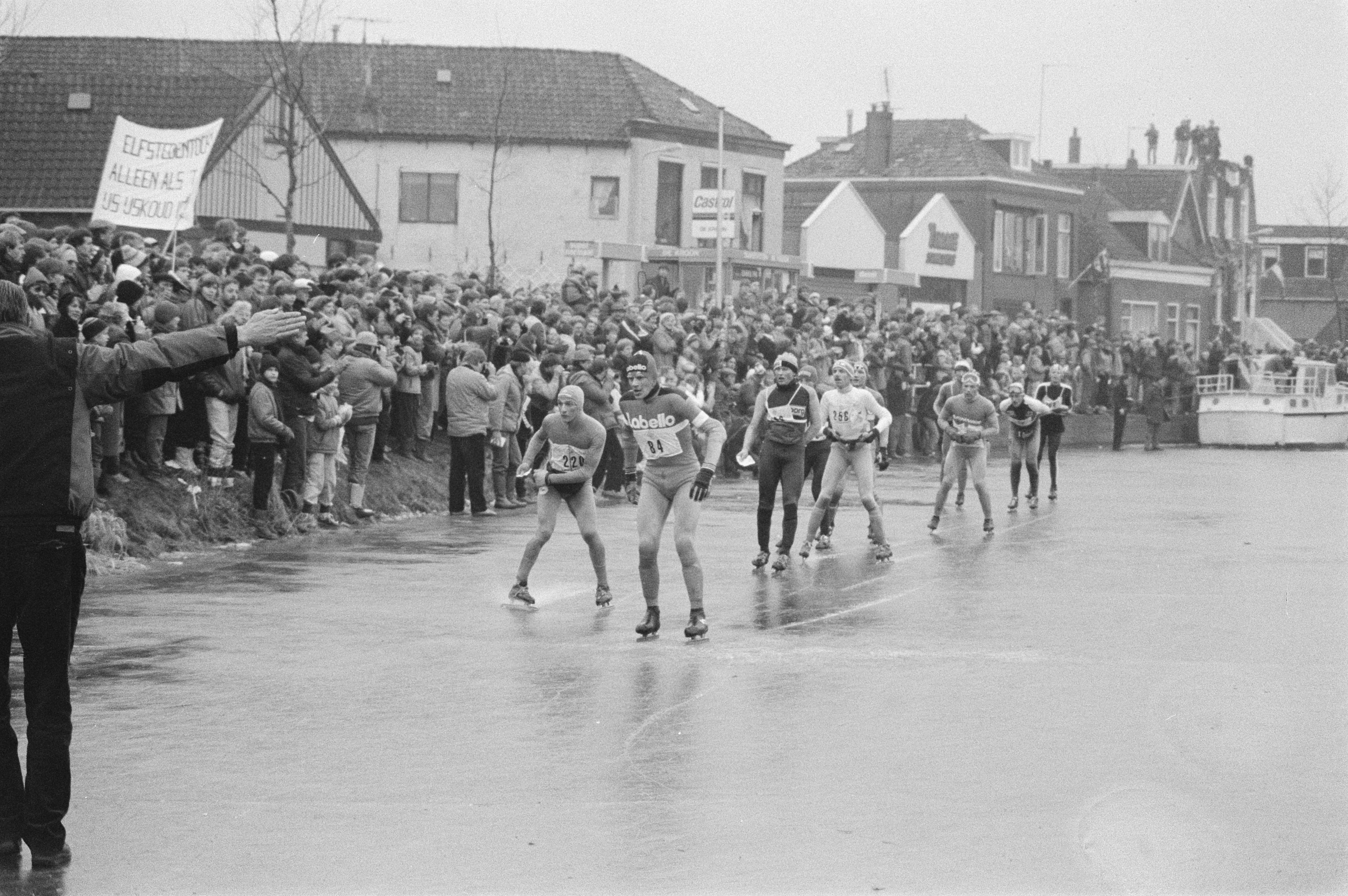
Kooiman (middle) heads the leading group in Bolsward during the 1985 Elfstedentocht.

=== Elfstedentocht ===
Kooiman played a pivotal role in the outcome of the 1985 Elfstedentocht. On the way to Dokkum, he broke away from the lead group of twelve skaters. Evert van Benthem quickly joined him, followed by Henri Ruitenberg and Jos Niesten. This group of four then sprinted for the overall victory. In the final stages, Kooiman was unaware of the exact distance remaining to the finish line. He was leading as they entered the final turn onto the Bonkevaart (canal), only to realize with shock, just as the finish line came into sight, that he was in the worst possible position. He lost the sprint and finished fourth behind winner Van Benthem, Ruitenberg (second), and Niesten (third). He had lost his card before even reaching the first checkpoint. Kooiman's stamp-covered skating suit was later to be seen at the Hindeloopen skating museum. Kooiman finished sixth in the 1986 Elfstedentocht, trailing Evert van Benthem by 4 minutes and 28 seconds. He also participated in the 1997 Elfstedentocht. By then, he had already retired from competitive skating for several years; he finished in 62nd place, nearly an hour behind the winner, Henk Angenent.

=== Alternative Elfstedentocht ===
Two weeks after finishing fourth in the Elfstedentocht, he travelled to Kuopio, Finland, where an "Alternative Elfstedentocht" was held on 2 March 1985. Kooiman broke away from a large lead group together with Theun Busser but lost the sprint, finishing second. Two years later came his second chance, and this time Kooiman did cross the finish line as the winner in Kuopio. It was a double success for the family, as Ineke Kooiman-van Homoet won the women's event. Towards the end of his career, on 27 January 1993, he once again won the 200-kilometre alternative race held on the Weißensee in Austria.

== Personal life ==
In 2013, Jan and Ineke Kooiman received the Roel van der Bas Medal from the "De Lekstreek" ice skating club in recognition of their contributions to the club, including their work as skating coaches. In 2012, they moved to Warns in Friesland for a small farmhouse and a two-hectare plot of land. Jan Kooiman, who had grown up on a dairy farm, wanted to keep a few cows, but land prices in the west were too high.

Their son Erik Jan Kooiman also became a marathon speed skater.

== Records ==
=== Personal bests ===
Distance	Time	Date	Track
500 m	42.28	5 March 1978	(Netherlands) The Hague
1000 m	1:24.10	4 January 1979	(Germany) Inzell
1500 m	2:06.73	29 January 1978	(Netherlands) The Hague
3000 m	4:26.20	4 January 1979	(Germany) Inzell
5000 m	7:25.68	8 November 1981	(Netherlands) The Hague
10 000 m	15:25.30	2013 March 1987	(Netherlands) Haarlem

=== World record ===
No.	Duration	Distance	Date	Track
1.	World hour record	38 558.45 m*	8 March 1983	(Germany) Inzell

*	= unofficial world record

== Long-track speed skating results ==
Year	NK All-round
1978	10th (17th, 9th, 15th, 7th)

(#, #, #, #) = distance ranking at all-round tournament (500 m, 5000 m, 1500 m, 10 000 m).

== Marathon speed skating results ==
=== Results in major competitions ===
Year	NK artificial ice	NK natural ice	Open NK natural ice	WK natural ice (unofficial)	Jaap Eden Trophy	KNSB Cup standing	Heineken Zesdaagse	Alternative Elfstedentocht	Elfstedentocht
1979					4th				
1980	4th				4th	7th		8th	
1981	10th				2nd place, silver medalist(s)	4th			
1982	1st place, gold medalist(s)				4th	1st place, gold medalist(s)			
1983	1st place, gold medalist(s)					2nd place, silver medalist(s)	2nd place, silver medalist(s)		
1984	2nd place, silver medalist(s)					4th	4th		
1985	7th	2nd place, silver medalist(s)			13th	5th	9th	2nd place, silver medalist(s)	4th
1986	1st place, gold medalist(s)	10th			8th	7th			6th
1987	5th				2nd place, silver medalist(s)	11th		1st place, gold medalist(s)	
1988				9th				4th	
1989								4th	
1990	11th		18th						
1991		21st							
1992	19th								
1993	23rd							1st place, gold medalist(s)	
1994								20th	
1997			9th						62nd

=== Results in natural-ice classics ===
Year	Amstelmeer Marathon	Driedaagse van Ankeveen	Noordwest- hoekrit	Rottemeren- tocht	Klassieker Cup
1982	2nd place, silver medalist(s)				
1985				4th	
1986		2nd place, silver medalist(s)	2nd place, silver medalist(s)		
1987		10th			
1996					56th
1997					15th

Source: Profile of Jan Kooiman at Marathonschaatsenutrecht.nl
