= Jos Niesten =

Dutch former speed skater (born 1945

- Niesten after his victory at the National Artificial Ice Championships in 1988.

Personal information
- Born: 5 December 1945 (age 80) Beverwijk, North Holland, Netherlands
- Years active: 1977–1991

Sport
- Sport: Marathon speed skating, Long-track speed skating
- Events: Long-distance, Marathons
- Club: IJsclub Kees Jongert

Jos Niesten (born 5 December 1945) is a Dutch former marathon and long-track speed skater. He finished third in the 1985 Elfstedentocht and became the Dutch marathon champion on artificial ice in 1988. He held the world one-hour speed skating record for two years (1981–1983). Furthermore, he won four natural-ice classics: the Rottemerentocht twice (in 1982 and 1985), De 100 van Eernewoude once (1986), and the Driedaagse van Ankeveen once (1987).

== Career ==
=== Early years ===
A market gardener's son, Niesten was born in Beverwijk. In his younger years, he had hardly any time for ice skating. "It was a case of working day and night at the market garden," he said in an interview with De Volkskrant. He is a cousin of the late cyclist Coen Niesten. Jos Niesten later moved to Heemskerk and did not take up speed skating until the age of 28. He first competed in long-track races as a B-category skater in 1975 and also skated marathons. He was physically fit, but his technique required significant refinement. A career as an all-round speed skater was not foreseen for him. He could hold his own against the top skaters in the 10,000 metres, but his 500-metre performance was substandard. "That short-distance work doesn't suit me. Even a 10,000-metre race doesn't last long enough for me." He achieved his first marathon victory on 3 December 1978 – two days before his 33rd birthday – at the Jaap Edenbaan in Amsterdam.

Niesten won the natural-ice classic Rottemerentocht in Zevenhuizen wearing bib number 1, crossing the finish line solo in 1982.

Niesten after his victory in the 1982 Rottemerentocht, where he was congratulated.

Franke Bouwstra and Niesten (behind him) klune during the 1985 Elfstedentocht.

=== A futile, arduous journey ===
Niesten (right) honoured in Heemskerk after finishing third in the 1985 Elfstedentocht.

The Rottemerentocht 1986: from left to right Evert van Benthem, Wim Vos, Ruud Christoffers, Niesten and Theun Busser.

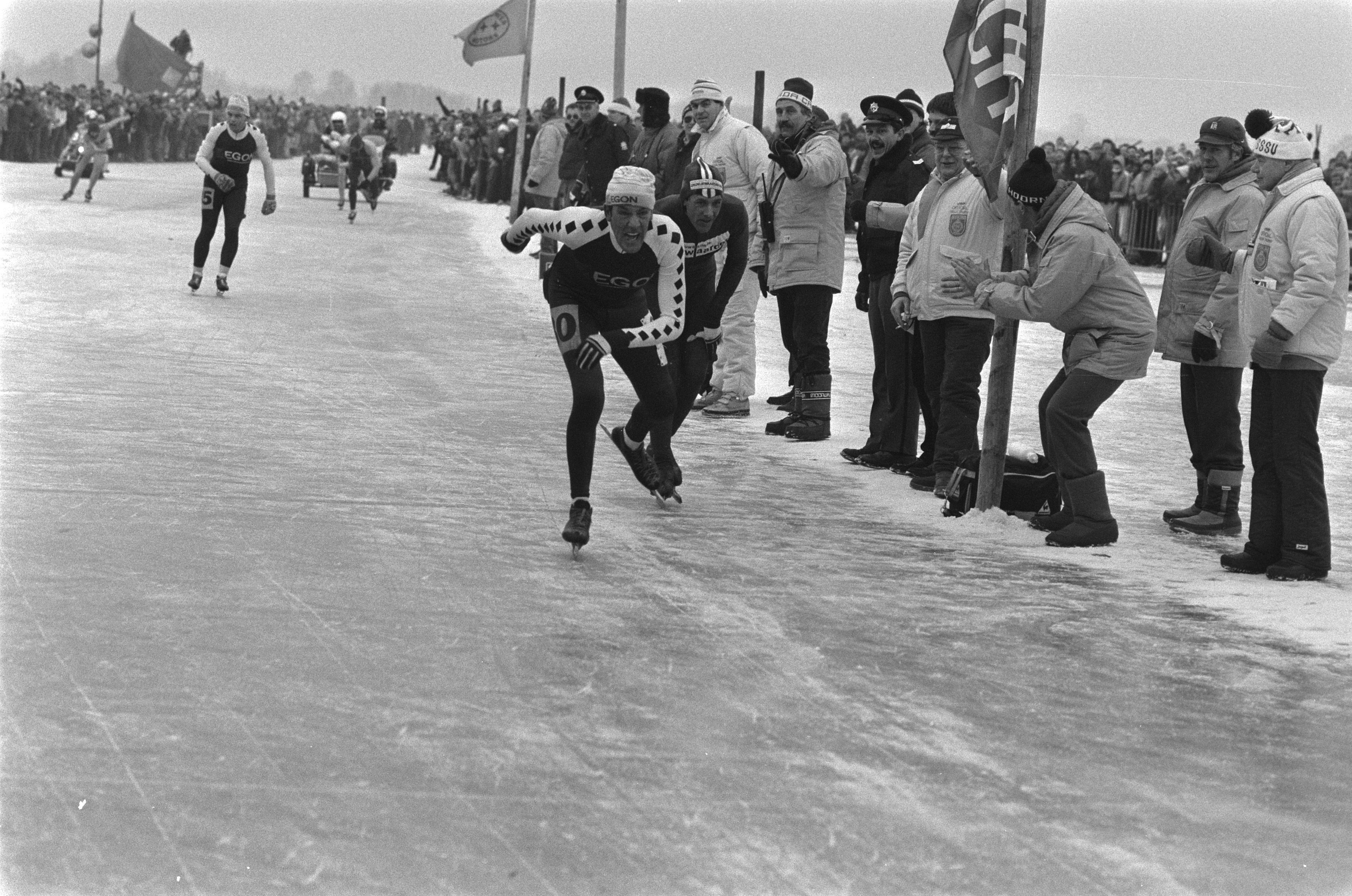
The 1986 Dutch natural-ice marathon skating championships, where Dries van Wijhe (left) finished just ahead of Niesten (right).

Driedaagse van Ankeveen in 1987 during the team time trial: Emiel Hopman, Niesten, and Frans Boon.

Driedaagse van Ankeveen 1987; at left Niesten, at right Richard van Kempen.

Nietsen crossed the finish line solo during the 1988 Dutch Marathon Skating Championships on artificial ice.

During the harsh winter of 1979, the Veluwemeertocht was held twice. In the first race, covering 65 kilometres, Niesten finished second on 4 January 1979, behind fellow local Ton Groot from Limmen. Three weeks later, the second edition took place, covering a distance of 200 kilometres. That morning, the top two finishers – Groot and Niesten – got into the car together at 5:15am to travel from North Holland to the starting point in Elburg in time. However, they failed to make it owing to the extremely slippery roads. After driving for three and a half hours, they called from Harderwijk to ask for the race to be delayed. Their request was in vain; by the time they arrived in Elburg after an arduous journey, the skaters had already been on the ice for half an hour.

Niesten in his greenhouse business, growing bell peppers in 1999.

=== World hour record ===
On 13 February 1981, Niesten undertook a successful attempt to break the world one-hour record. At the ice rink in Inzell, southern Germany, he covered a distance of 37,638 metres – nearly 700 metres farther than Jan Roelof Kruithof's five-year-old record. Niesten held the record for two years until Jan Kooiman became the first to break the 38-kilometre barrier on the same track.

=== Winner of the Rottemerentocht ===
Niesten won his first natural-ice classic on 16 January 1982. He crossed the finish line solo in Zevenhuizen after completing the 200-kilometre Rottemerentocht. Seven kilometres from the finish, he shook off his last challenger, Co Giling, who finished second more than a minute later. He achieved the highest average speed ever recorded in a 200-kilometre race: 35.057 kilometres an hour. He collected 4,000 guilders in prize money and bonuses.

The Royal Dutch Skating Federation (Koninklijke Nederlandsche Schaatsenrijders Bond; KNSB) had banned this race beforehand because a marathon counting towards the KNSB Cup was scheduled for that same evening at the Jaap Eden rink in Amsterdam. Twenty skaters were suspended for two races, including Niesten, who nevertheless did go on to compete on the ice in Amsterdam that evening after his victory. The suspensions were overturned by the KNSB disciplinary committee two months later.

=== Elfstedentocht ===
In 1983, Niesten participated in the Alternative Elfstedentocht, which was held in the United States for the first time. He skated in the lead for a long time on Lake Memphremagog, on the border with Canada. He was overtaken by the eventual winner, Jan Roelof Kruithof. He lost his chance after falling four times and finished in twelfth place. A year later, he lined up at the start in Ottawa. Niesten won the preliminary race over 80 kilometres and finished seventh in the main race.

Two weeks before the 1985 Elfstedentocht, Niesten announced that he would retire at the end of the season. He was among the pre-race favourites to win the Elfstedentocht. Niesten was part of the leading group of four and was narrowly beaten in the final sprint by Evert van Benthem and the runner-up, Henri Ruitenberg.

=== Thinking better of his decision ===
The forty-year-old Niesten returned to the ice in late 1985 after all. He stated that he wanted to wind down his career and no longer skate a marathon every week. In early December 1985, he set a track record of 15:00.37 in the 10-kilometre event at the Frankfurt ice rink, and achieved a marathon victory at the Jaap Eden Rink on 6 February 1986. A week later, he took silver at the Dutch natural-ice marathon skating championships and won the natural-ice classic De 100 van Eernewoude.

Niesten signed up for the Elfstedentocht of 26 February 1986. Five days earlier, the classic Rottemerentocht race had taken place, in which he finished second behind Evert van Benthem. Niesten once again started the Elfstedentocht as a favourite, but he was forced to withdraw early. During a crash just before Harlingen, he dislocated his arm and had to go to hospital for treatment.

=== Later life ===
Niesten continued racing in the peloton for a few more years and achieved a few more successes in the twilight of his career. For instance, in early February 1987, he won the Three Days of Ankeveen (Driedaagse van Ankeveen), an event shortened to two days that year owing to the onset of a thaw. Later that year, he improved his personal best in the 10,000 metres, clocking a time of 14:28.78. This performance earned him fourth place at the selection races held at the Thialf ice rink in Heerenveen.

On 16 January 1988, at the age of 42, Niesten won the Dutch marathon skating championships on artificial ice for the first time.

That month, Niesten also competed in the Dutch Single Distance Championships and finished eighth in the 10,000 metres with a time of 14:38.25. In 1990, he and his Haarlem-based team won a 24-hour marathon in Baselga di Piné, Italy.

The spell of freezing weather in 1991 lured Niesten back onto the ice for a few natural-ice races, such as the classic Ronde van Loosdrecht. The USA Marathon, though, in which he finished fourteenth, was his last major race.

Niesten twice received the Abe de Vries Trophy for the most combative skater of the season. After his active career as a skater, he spent three years as team manager for Frisia Financieringen, Dirk Scheringa's speed skating team.

Niesten grew various kinds of vegetables and flowers in his greenhouses on the edge of the dunes in Heemskerk. In 1990, he switched to growing bell peppers. He was named an honorary citizen of Heemskerk in 2020. He served as a board member of the "Kees Jongert" ice skating club for fifty years.

== Records ==
=== Personal bests ===
Distance	Time	Date	Track
500 m	44.50	8 December 1977	(Netherlands) Haarlem
1 000 m	1:28.5	12 February 1982	(Netherlands) Alkmaar
1 500 m	2:08.1	14 February 1982	(Netherlands) Alkmaar
3 000 m	4:24.7	17 February 1981	(Germany) Inzell
5 000 m	7:26.5	16 February 1981	(Germany) Inzell
10 000 m	14:28.78	17 December 1987	(Netherlands) Heerenveen

=== World record ===
No.	Duration	Distance	Date	Track
1.	World hour record	37.638,26 m*	13 February 1981	(Germany) Inzell

*	= unofficial world record

== Long-track speed skating results ==
Year	NK distances
1998	8th 10 000 m

== Marathon speed skating results ==
=== Results in major competitions ===
Jaar	NK artificial ice	NK natural ice	Jaap Eden Trophy	KNSB Cup standing	Heineken Six-Day Race	Alternative Elfstedentocht	Elfstedentocht
1979	23rd	10th	3rd place, bronze medalist(s)	14th			
1980	19th		10th	4th			
1981	5th		9th	7th			
1982	5th		7th	5th			
1983	2nd place, silver medalist(s)		6th	4th	7th	12th	
1984	4th		5th	2nd place, silver medalist(s)	5th	7th	
1985	12th	3rd place, bronze medalist(s)		6th			3rd place, bronze medalist(s)
1986	12th	2nd place, silver medalist(s)	13th	19th	14th		withdrew
1987	13th	6th	3rd place, bronze medalist(s)	24th	9th		
1988	1st place, gold medalist(s)		4th	4th			

=== Results in natural-ice classics ===
Year	De 100 van Eernewoude	Amstelmeer Marathon	Ronde van Loosdrecht	Rottemeren- tocht	Driedaagse van Ankeveen	Veluwemeer- tocht	USA Marathon
1979		4th		2nd place, silver medalist(s)		2nd place, silver medalist(s)	
1980	8th					3rd place, bronze medalist(s)	
1982				1st place, gold medalist(s)			
1985				1st place, gold medalist(s)			
1986	1st place, gold medalist(s)			2nd place, silver medalist(s)			
1987		7th			1st place, gold medalist(s)		
1991			23rd				14th

=== Medal table ===
Championship	Gold (gold)	Silver (silver)	Bronze (bronze)
NK kunstijs	1	1	0
NK natuurijs	0	1	1
KNSB Cup standings	0	1	0
Natuurijsklassiekers	4	3	1
Elfstedentocht	0	0	1
Wedstrijden op kunstijs	10	14	15

Sources:

- Profile of Jos Niesten at Schaatspeloton.nl
- Profile of Jos Niesten at Marathonschaatsenutrecht.nl
- Profile of Jos Niesten at Schaatsstatistieken.nl
