= René Ruitenberg =

Dutch former speed skater (born 1970)

Personal information
- Born: 8 December 1970 (age 55) Wezep, Gelderland, Netherlands
- Years active: 1990–2012

Sport
- Sport: Marathon speed skating
- Event: Natural ice

René Ruitenberg (born 8 December 1970) is a Dutch former marathon speed skater and clergyman. He became the Dutch national champion on artificial ice once (1992) and won the Open Dutch national championship on natural ice once (2002). Furthermore, he won the Royal Dutch Skating Federation (Koninklijke Nederlandsche Schaatsenrijders Bond; KNSB) Cup in 1997. He competed in the Elfstedentocht once as a professional racer – a race in which he was disqualified – and won a total of three "natural ice classics": the Amstelmeer Marathon (1991), the Veluwemeertocht (1997), and the USA Marathon (1997). In 1993, he won the Alternative Elfstedentocht.

== Career ==
=== Early years ===
Ruitenberg grew up in a religious family with eight children. On Sundays, church was the central focus, and participating in sports was not permitted.

At the outset, football was his great passion. He played so well that Go Ahead Eagles, from the nearby city of Deventer, wanted to sign him as a professional footballer. On the very day that he was set to sign his contract, he saw his elder brother, Henri Ruitenberg, finish in second place in the Elfstedentocht on television. He thus chose to focus on speed skating instead, trading his football boots for ice skates. After this switch, he became the Dutch inline skating champion twice. He achieved his first great success on the ice at the 1991 Dutch National Marathon Skating Championships on natural ice, where he won the silver medal behind Dries van Wijhe, who had broken away solo thirty kilometres from the finish line. A week later, he won the Amstelmeer Marathon, one of that winter's toughest natural-ice races. He finished second in the Super Prestige standings that season.

=== Dutch artificial ice champion ===
In 1992, at the age of 21, Ruitenberg became the Dutch champion on artificial ice, making him one of the youngest champions ever, after Emiel Hopman, who had achieved the feat in 1984. He had not expected this victory, for he had never before won a race on artificial ice.

At the time, Ruitenberg combined marathon speed skating with inline skating, and he had intended to focus exclusively on speed skating only a few years later. Winning the national title changed these plans, and he decided to concentrate further on marathon speed skating.

=== Peak years ===
In 1997, Ruitenberg won the KNSB Cup. In all, he secured seven victories in competitive events held on artificial ice. On natural ice, his wins included the 2002 Open Dutch Marathon Skating Championships, held on Orsasjön (lake) near Mora, Sweden, as well as the USA Marathon and the Veluwemeertocht. In the 1997 Elfstedentocht, he finished in thirteenth place; however, he was removed from the official results for having missed a checkpoint in Hindeloopen, though he did receive the traditional Elfstedentocht cross. Ruitenberg concluded his marathon skating career following the 2011/2012 season. The next season, he became the team manager for Team Van Werven.

On 1 April 2010, he became director of the foundation "Sports Witnesses". On 1 January 2011, the foundation was renamed "Geloofshelden" ("Faith Heroes"). Ruitenberg became a pastor in an Evangelical congregation and subsequently focused mainly on activities within the Christian faith.

In addition to speed skating, he worked part-time as a bookkeeper at his father's company.

=== Personal life ===
Ruitenberg and his wife Mirjam wed in 1996. In interviews and a documentary for the television programme De verandering ("The Change"), he later revealed that he had been unfaithful on several occasions during their courtship and the early period of their marriage. Eventually, he confessed this to his wife, who forgave him.

== Marathon speed skating results ==
=== Results in major competitions ===
Year	NK artificial ice	NK natural ice	Open NK natural ice	WK natural ice (unofficial)	Jaap Eden Trophy	KNSB Cup standing	Grand Prix standing	The Greenery Six	Alternative Elfstedentocht	Elfstedentocht
1990			9th							
1991	6th	2nd place, silver medalist(s)			19th	15th				
1992	1st place, gold medalist(s)		6th			23rd				
1993		withdrew	19th	1st place, gold medalist(s)	33rd				1st place, gold medalist(s)	
1994	19th	13th		4th	14th				13th	
1995			8th			13th				
1996	6th	3rd place, bronze medalist(s)			12th	21st				
1997	31st	7th	withdrew		2nd place, silver medalist(s)	1st place, gold medalist(s)				disqualified
1998	3rd place, bronze medalist(s)		2nd place, silver medalist(s)		10th	3rd place, bronze medalist(s)				
1999	13th		4th		2nd place, silver medalist(s)	7th		17th	6th	
2000	5th		3rd place, bronze medalist(s)		19th	7th		22nd	4th	
2001	12th		withdrew		4th	5th		22nd	14th	
2002	7th		1st place, gold medalist(s)		14th	21st		21st	(bronze) , (silver)	
2003	15th		42nd			33rd		15th		
2004	28th				64th	29th		41st	(silver) , (bronze)	
2005			55th			35th			7th, (bronze)	
2006			65th						36th, (bronze)	
2007			54th		41st	10th	14th	11th		
2008			3rd place, bronze medalist(s)		49th	58th	12th		5th	
2009	21st	5th	72nd			46th			50th	
2010			8th		53rd	40th	17th		118th	
2011		50th	17th			41st				
2012		38th	70th			56th				

=== Results in natural-ice classics ===
Year	De 100 van Eernewoude	Amstelmeer Marathon	Ronde van Loosdrecht	Westland Marathon	Driedaagse van Ankeveen	Noordwest- hoekrit	Oldambt- rit	Ronde van Duurswold	Ronde van Skarsterlân	Rottemeren- tocht	Veluwemeer- tocht	USA Marathon	Klassieker Cup
1991	2nd place, silver medalist(s)	1st place, gold medalist(s)	2nd place, silver medalist(s)			3rd place, bronze medalist(s)							2nd place, silver medalist(s)
1996			11th	3rd place, bronze medalist(s)	18th		12th				2nd place, silver medalist(s)		7th
1997										8th	1st place, gold medalist(s)	1st place, gold medalist(s)	7th
2010			25th					24th	17th		9th		
2012	19th								13th		28th		

Sources:

- Team van Werven
- Profile of René Ruitenberg at Schaatspeloton.nl
- Profile of René Ruitenberg at Marathonschaatsenutrecht.nl
