= Ammerstol =

- Village
- Flag Coat of arms
- Interactive map of Ammerstol
- Coordinates: 51°55′39″N 4°48′31″E
- Country: Netherlands
- Province: South Holland
- Municipality: Krimpenerwaard

Population (2009)
  - Total: 1,544

Ammerstol is a village, part of the municipality of Krimpenerwaard in the Netherlands. It is located about 12 kilometres (7.5 mi) southeast of Gouda, on the Lek River.

Between 1817 and 1985, Ammerstol was an independent municipality. Until 2015, it was part of Bergambacht.

Ammerstol has two listed Rijksmonuments: the 17th century inventory of its Reformed Church (itself built during 1880-81), and a thatched-roof farmhouse.

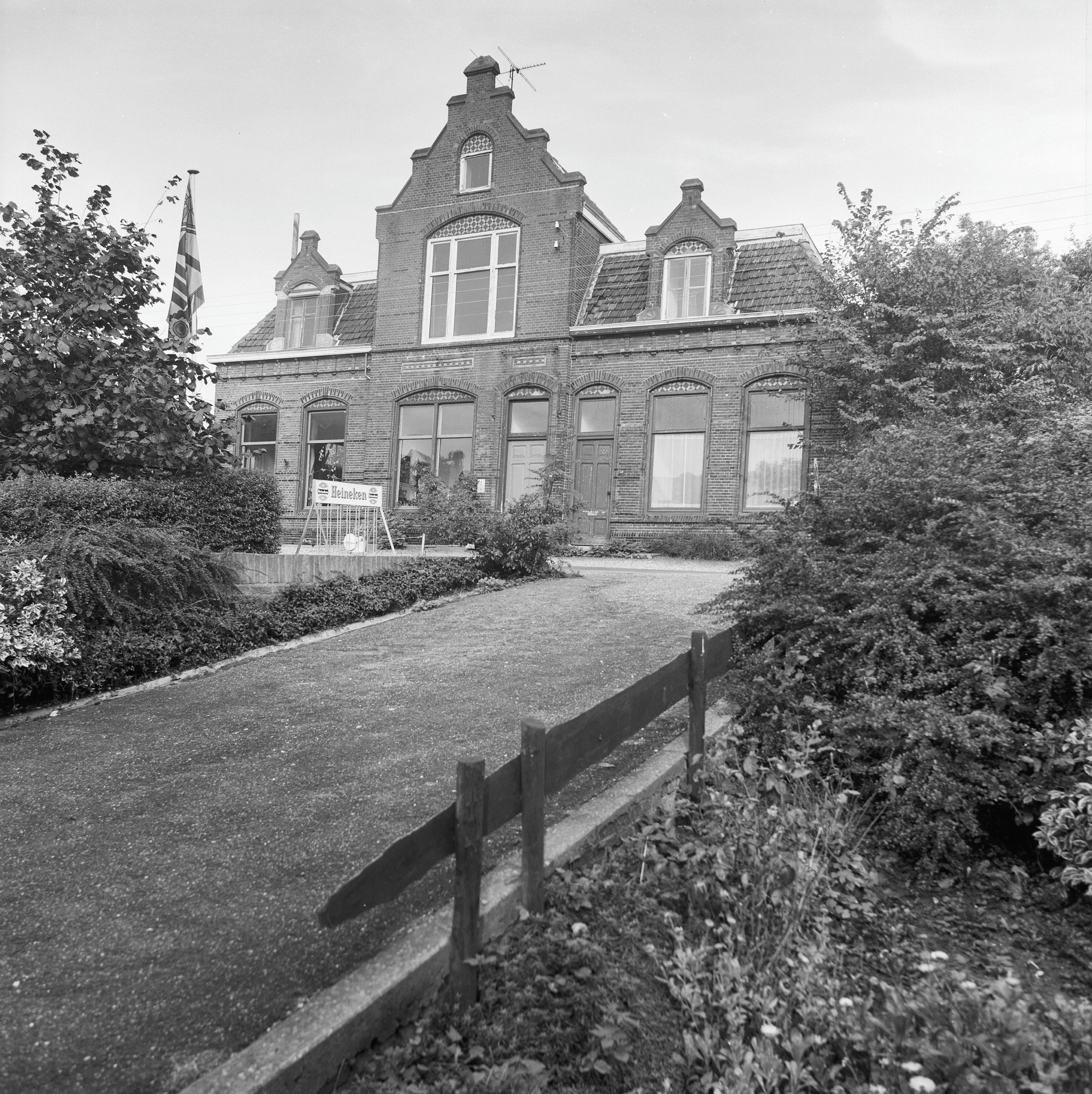
The former post office in Ammerstol

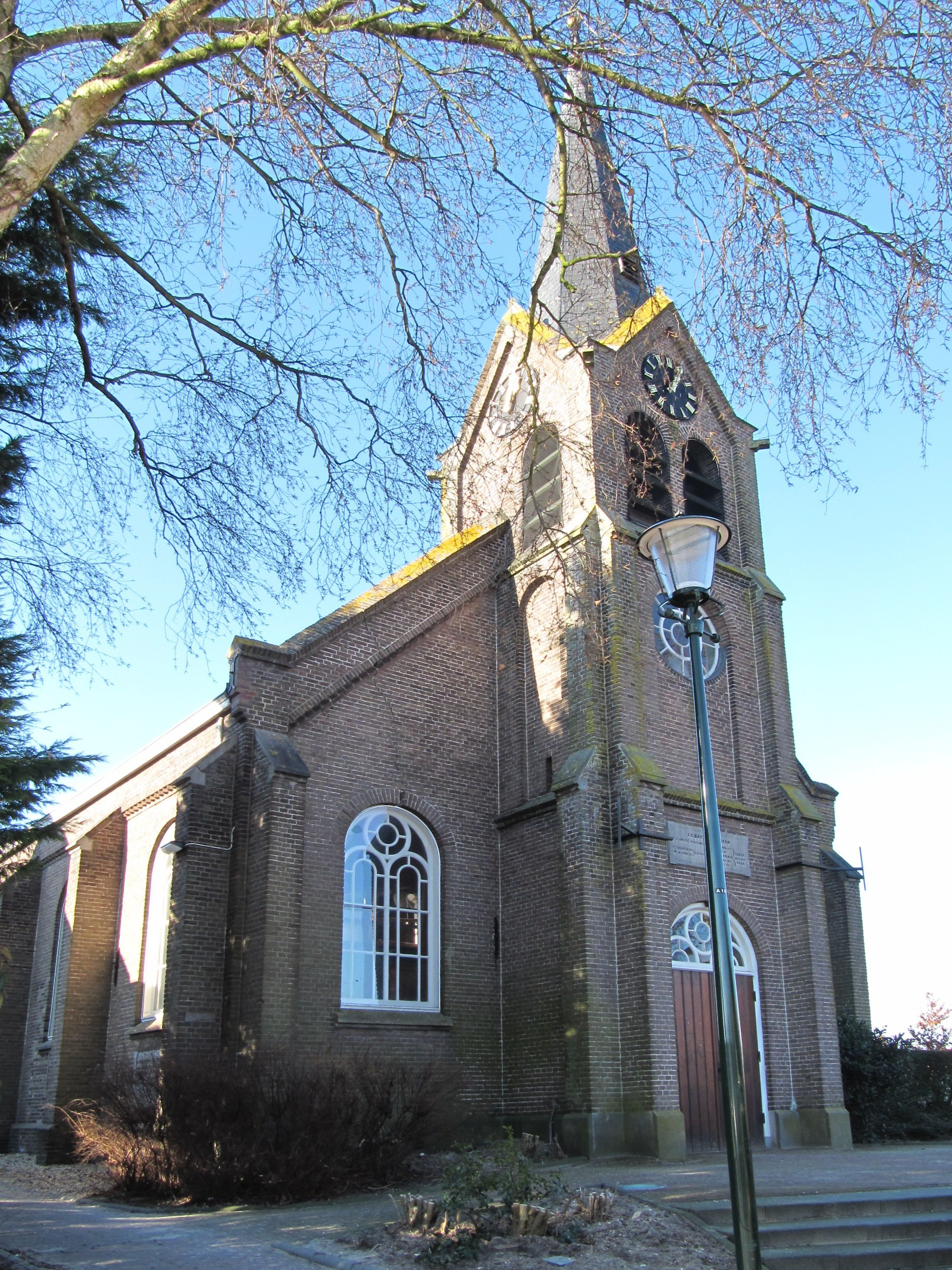
Ammerstol's Reformed Church

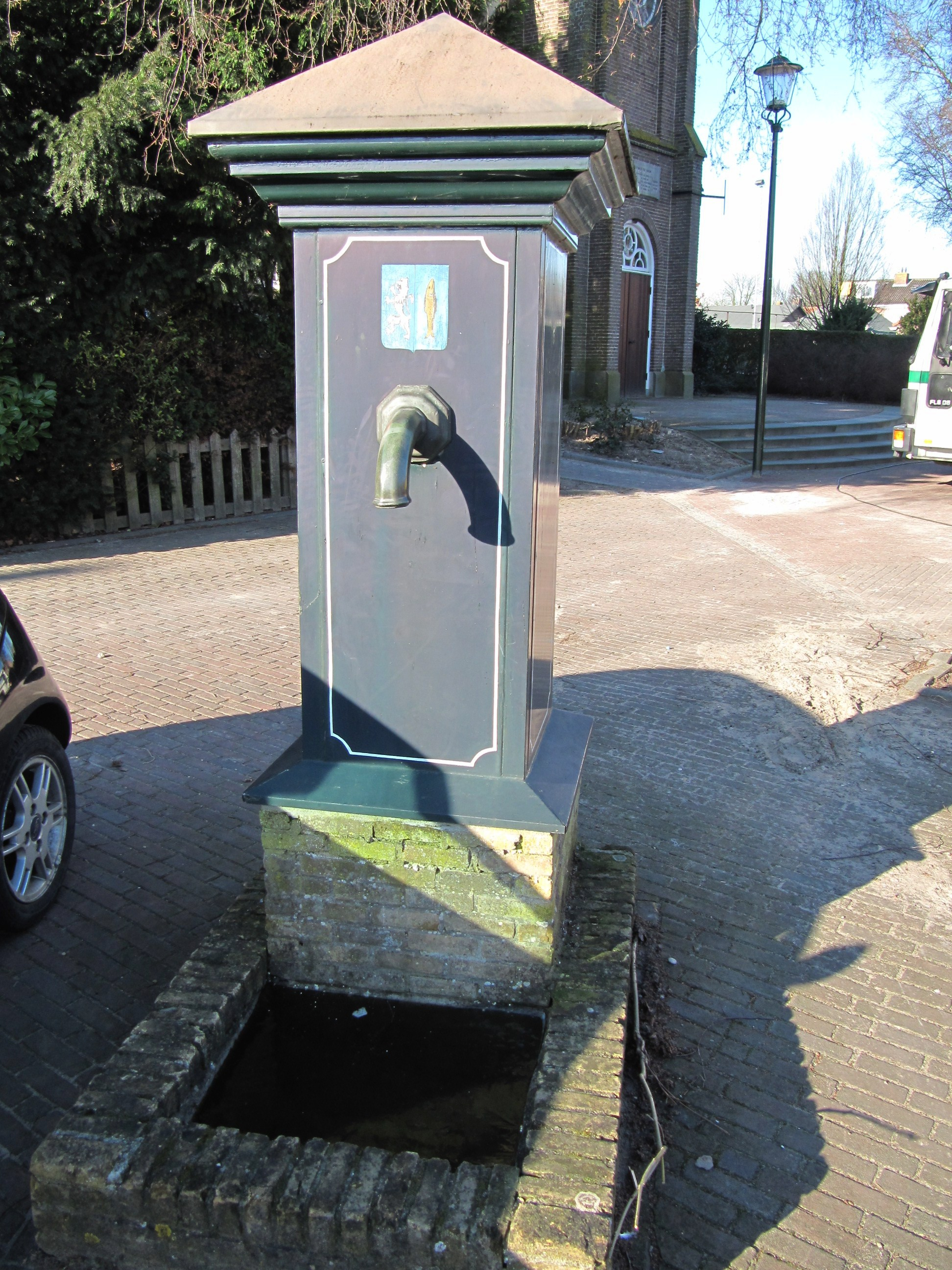
Village pump on the Kerkplein

== Notable people ==
- Jan Kooiman (born 1953), speed skater
