= Coen Niesten =

Dutch cyclist (1938–2024)

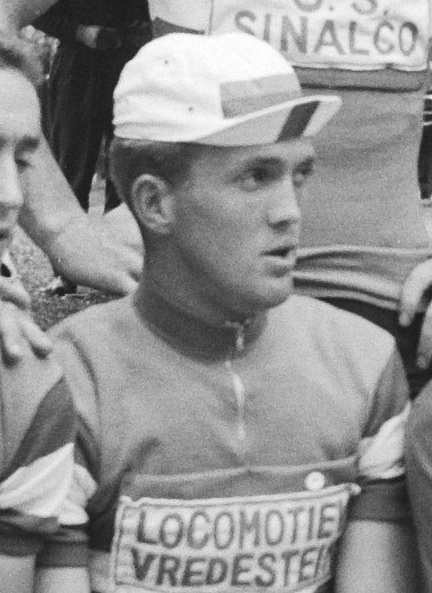
- Niesten in 1960

Personal information
- Born: 30 August 1938 Wijk aan Zee en Duin, Netherlands
- Died: 23 October 2024 (aged 86) Beverwijk, Netherlands

Cycling career
- Sport: Cycling
- Role: Rider

Coen Niesten (30 August 1938 – 23 October 2024) was a Dutch professional racing cyclist. He rode the 1960 and 1961 Tour de France. Niesten died in Beverwijk on 23 October 2024, at the age of 86.

Niesten was cousin to the former speed skater Jos Niesten.
