= Henri Ruitenberg =

Dutch former speed skater (born 1957)

- Ruitenberg wins KNSB Cup (1985)

Personal information
- Born: 28 January 1957 (age 69) Oldebroek, Gelderland, Netherlands
- Years active: 1981–2005

Sport
- Sport: Marathon speed skating

Henri Ruitenberg (born 28 January 1957) is a Dutch former marathon speed skater who was part of the peloton for a quarter of a century. He was the Dutch champion on natural ice in 1985, won the Jaap Eden Trophy in 1984, and triumphed twice in the Hollands Venetiëtocht, a classic natural-ice race, in 1986 and 1987. He won three overall series titles: the Heineken Six-Day (1984), the Royal Dutch Skating Federation (Koninklijke Nederlandsche Schaatsenrijders Bond; KNSB) Cup (1985), and the Klassieker Cup (1996). He was best known for finishing second in the 1985 Elfstedentocht.

== Career ==
=== Early years ===
Ruitenberg played football for a lower-level team at OverWinnen Is Ons Streven ("Overcoming Is Our Aim"; OWIOS) in his hometown of Oldebroek, where his father ran a fodder business. In 1977, he took part in a natural-ice skating race in Oldebroek. For Ruitenberg, the race was over after ten laps, yet he enjoyed the atmosphere and the setting, largely thanks to fellow local and crowd-pleaser Dries van Wijhe. Ruitenberg subsequently decided to become a marathon speed skater and joined the DSO ice skating club in Epe. He was a quick learner; after one year as a B-division skater, he was promoted to the A-group. Even so, it took a few more seasons for him to achieve his breakthrough. Ruitenberg, who worked as a heating technician, combined speed skating with cycling. During the summer months, he competed in about sixty amateur criteriums, while in the winter he switched to cyclo-cross. From 1983 onwards, he reduced the number of cycling races he entered, using cycling primarily as training for speed skating.

=== Peak year ===
That paid off, as Ruitenberg won the Jaap Eden Trophy, the season opener for marathon skating, on 4 November 1984. This victory heralded a successful period. In mid-December 1984, he won the overall classification of the Heineken Six-Day race, and on 15 January 1985, he became the Dutch champion in marathon speed skating on natural ice.

In late February, he took first place in the KNSB Cup standings. In the midst of this, the Elfstedentocht took place on 21 February 1985. Ruitenberg was in good form and a contender for overall victory. He formed the lead group with Evert van Benthem, Jan Kooiman, and Jos Niesten during the decisive final stage. In the sprint, he was narrowly beaten by Van Benthem and finished in second place. Through Dries van Wijhe's skilful agency, he found another job as a bicycle mechanic at a bicycle shop. This left him with more time for training and inline skating during the summer months.

=== Setback ===
He soon suffered a setback during the following speed skating season. He fell ill, and the intensive inline skating he had done over the summer seemed to be taking its toll. During January 1986 he got back into shape. On 16 February he won the natural ice classic Hollands Venetiëtocht and he was again considered the favourite for the fourteenth Elfstedentocht which was held ten days later. But Ruitenberg could not play a leading role this time. He fell behind while kluning and broke off a point of his skate early on. He finished in ninth place, just over 9 minutes behind winner Van Benthem. In 1987 he won the Hollands Venetiëtocht for the second time.

=== Later years ===
In the years that followed, Ruitenberg achieved several podium finishes but did not secure any further major marathon victories. However, on 9 September 1989, he became the Dutch inline skating champion in Maasland. In February 1996, he finished at the top of the Classic Cup standings, having accumulated the most points in that season's natural-ice classics. During the Elfstedentocht on 4 January 1997, the nearly forty-year-old Ruitenberg raced in support of his younger brother, René. Both brothers were in the lead group, but René fell behind following a crash. Henri briefly eased up, but his brother was unable to rejoin the pack. Henri also lost contact with the lead group and skated solo to the finish line, crossing it in thirteenth place. After Piet Kleine's disqualification for missing a checkpoint, Ruitenberg moved up to twelfth place. Towards the end of his career, marathon speed skating became more commercial as major companies, such as Wehkamp and DSB Bank, invested in the sport. Ruitenberg, who had been a full-time athlete since 1996, remained part of the marathon peloton until the age of forty-eight. After spending a few seasons competing in relative obscurity, he retired in March 2005.

Ruitenberg's wife died in a traffic collision in Oldebroek on 19 August 2002.

== Marathon speed skating results ==
=== Results in major competitions ===
Year	NK artificial ice	Open NK natural ice	Open NK artificial ice	WK natural ice (unofficial)	Jaap Eden Trophy	KNSB Cup standing	Heineken Zesdaagse	Alternative Elfstedentocht	Elfstedentocht
1982	21st				9th	12th			
1983	6th					6th	3rd place, bronze medalist(s)	17th	
1984	5th				1st place, gold medalist(s)	10th	1st place, gold medalist(s)		
1985	5th	1st place, gold medalist(s)				1st place, gold medalist(s)		74th	2nd place, silver medalist(s)
1986	3rd place, bronze medalist(s)	3rd place, bronze medalist(s)			5th	13th	19th		9th
1987	12th	4th			12th	8th	10th		
1988	7th				12th	5th	8th		
1989	2nd place, silver medalist(s)			4th		22nd			
1990									
1991		8th		10th					
1992	8th		10th			30th			
1993		6th	14th	5th	14th				
1994	withdrew	3rd place, bronze medalist(s)							
1995	30th		18th		35th				
1996	15th	7th			5th	37th			
1997	29th		19th			35th		8th	12th
1998			43rd		55th			19th	
1999			19th			48th		17th	
2000	24th		11th			29th		48th	
2001	37th		withdrew		17th				
2002	44th		5th			53rd		12th	
2003	29th		45th		62nd	55th			
2004	50th		19th		51st			31st	

=== Results in natural-ice classics ===
Year	De 100 van Eernewoude	Amstelmeer Marathon	Ronde van Loosdrecht	Westland Marathon	Driedaagse van Ankeveen	Noordwest- hoekrit	Oldambt- rit	Hollands Venetiëtocht	Rottemeren- tocht	Veluwemeer- tocht	USA Marathon	Klassieker Cup
1985									3rd place, bronze medalist(s)			
1986					4th			1st place, gold medalist(s)				
1987				12th	7th			1st place, gold medalist(s)				
1991	4th	11th	6th			6th						10th
1994	7th											
1996	15th	5th	4th	4th	5th		4th	6th		5th		1st place, gold medalist(s)
1997								8th	13th	6th	11th	16th

Sources:

- Profile of Henri Ruitenberg at Schaatspeloton.nl
- Profile of Henri Ruitenberg at Marathonschaatsenutrecht.nl
