= Lenie van der Hoorn =

Dutch speed skater (born 1948)

- Van der Hoorn at the presentation of a book about the 1986 Elfstedentocht

Personal information
- Born: 30 March 1948 (age 78) Pijnacker, South Holland, Netherlands
- Years active: 1972-2008

Sport
- Sport: Marathon speed skating
- Event: Natural ice
- Club: IJsclub Haarlem

Lenie van der Hoorn-Langelaan (born 30 March 1948) is a Dutch long-distance speed skater and the first female winner of the Elfstedentocht.

== Biography ==
Lenie Langelaan, as she was then known, achieved her first success on 7 January 1970, in the Ronde van Loosdrecht, in which she finished second. In 1972, she married Jan van der Hoorn, moved from Pijnacker to Ter Aar, and switched her club affiliation from Schaats Vereniging Rotterdam to Trainingsgroep Ter Aar. While there, she enjoyed success in 1976 during the Oldambtrit. In 1979, she won the Driedaagse van Ankeveen, the Westland Marathon (a title she would win again in 1981), and the Rottemerentocht. She won the last event again in 1982 and 1991; the 1982 victory earned her the highest prize money of her career: 200 guilders. Furthermore, she won the Veluwemeertocht in 1980 and 1987, and on 26 February 1978, she set the world one-hour speed skating record at the Jaap Eden ice rink in Amsterdam, covering a distance of 31,212.59 metres. Van der Hoorn also participated in the first official Dutch National Marathon Skating Championship on natural ice, held on the Loosdrechtse Plassen (lakes). On 21 February 1985, at the age of 36, she became the first woman to finish the 13th Elfstedentocht, arriving 47 minutes after Evert van Benthem and ahead of Betty Westerveld and Ineke Kooiman. Thus, Van der Hoorn became the first-ever unofficial female winner of the Elfstedentocht. A year later, in the Fourteenth Elfstedentocht, she finished as the third woman.

As of 2008, Van der Hoorn was still participating in the marathon speed skating competition in Haarlem, organized by the Haarlem Marathon Committee. She is a member of the Haarlem Ice Skating Club (IJsclub Haarlem) and resides in the municipality of Nieuwkoop. On 5 January 2020, the programme Andere Tijden Sport featured a report titled "The Invisible Winner of the Elfstedentocht" (De onzichtbare winnares van de Elfstedentocht).

On 18 January 2021, Van der Hoorn and the first women to finish the Elfstedentocht in 1986 – Tineke Dijkshoorn – and 1997 – Klasina Seinstra – were belatedly honoured as winners. The chairman of the Frisian Eleven Cities Association (Vereniging de Friese Elfsteden) presented them with a certificate and a vase, the latter featuring an illustration of the route. The female winners' names on the "Elfstedenrijder" (Eleven Cities Skater) monument were unveiled on 23 November 2022.

== Marathon speed skating results ==
=== Results in major competitions ===
Year	NK artificial ice	NK natural ice	KNSB Cup standing	Heineken Zesdaagse	Alternative Elfstedentocht	Elfstedentocht
1974	5th		6th			
1975	6th		4th			
1976	7th		2nd place, silver medalist(s)			
1977	8th					
1978	5th					
1979	9th		3rd place, bronze medalist(s)			
1980	6th		2nd place, silver medalist(s)			
1981						
1982	8th		6th			
1983						
1984				9th		
1985	4th	3rd place, bronze medalist(s)				1st place, gold medalist(s)
1986		5th				3rd place, bronze medalist(s)
1987	14th	7th				
1988	16th					
1989						
1990	18th					
1991		10th				
1992						
1993		7th				
1994	22nd	15th				
1995						
1996	22nd	22nd	30th		3rd place, bronze medalist(s)	
1997		14th	40th			
1998	36th					12th

=== Results in natural-ice classics ===
Year	Amstelmeer Marathon	Ronde van Loosdrecht	Westland Marathon	Driedaagse van Ankeveen	Oldambt- rit	Rottemeren- tocht	Veluwemeer- tocht	USA Marathon	Klassieker Cup
1976					1st place, gold medalist(s)				
1979				1st place, gold medalist(s)		1st place, gold medalist(s)			
1980							1st place, gold medalist(s)		
1982						1st place, gold medalist(s)			
1986							1st place, gold medalist(s)		
1991		3rd place, bronze medalist(s)							
1996	10th						5th		14th
1997	7th		8th			5th	7th	3rd place, bronze medalist(s)	4th
