= Rein Jonker =

Dutch former speed skater (born 1950)

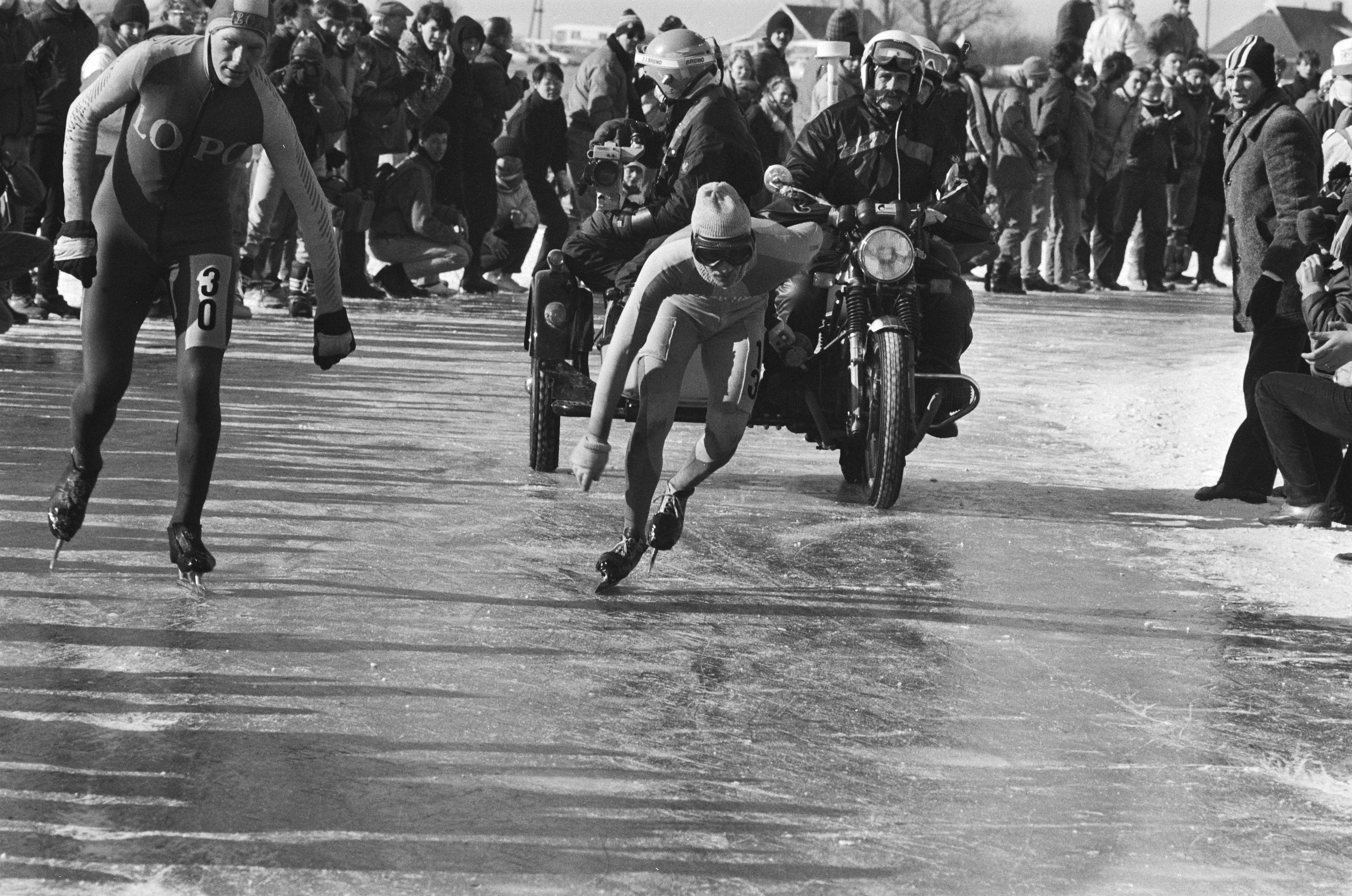
- Jonker (left) with Evert van Benthem in the 1986 Elfstedentocht final.

Personal information
- Nickname: De Diesel
- Born: 10 September 1950 (age 76) Warten, Friesland, Netherlands
- Years active: 1981–1997

Sport
- Sport: Marathon speed skating
- Events: Long distances and marathons

Rein Jonker (born 10 September 1950) is a Dutch former marathon speed skater. He finished in second place in the 1986 Elfstedentocht. Also, he placed second twice in the natural-ice classic, the Oldambtrit.

== Career ==
=== Early years ===
Jonker was twelve years old when the Elfstedentocht took place on 18 January 1963. At his neighbours' house, he watched footage on television of the gruelling race, which was won by Reinier Paping. He resolved that, one day, he would skate the Elfstedentocht himself. Before the Thialf ice rink in Heerenveen opened in 1967, Jonker had to travel by bus to Deventer during his youth to train at the IJsselstadion.

As well as speed skating, Jonker also engaged in inline skating, running, and cycling. He balanced his athletic pursuits with his job as head chef at a care home in Grouw. As a marathon skater, he often took on a supporting role, such as closing gaps when others broke away, setting up intermediate sprints, and maintaining a high pace during the final stages of a race. Because of his strength and endurance, he was nicknamed "The Diesel" (Dutch: De Diesel).

=== Alternative Elfstedentocht ===
Owing to a series of mild winters with little ice for skating in the Netherlands, marathon speed skaters sought out locations abroad. After a few races in Scandinavia, the Alternatieve Elfstedentocht took place in the United States for the first time on 19 February 1983. On Lake Memphremagog, lying astride the border with Canada, Jonker finished in sixth place, one and a half minutes behind the winner, Jan Roelof Kruithof. A year later, on 11 February 1984, he also lined up at the start in Ottawa, Canada, and finished in fifth place.

His best performance was a podium finish on 5 March 1988, in Kuopio, Finland. Jonker finished in third place after a sprint against the winner, Evert van Benthem, and runner-up Bert Verduin.

=== Elfstedentocht 1985 ===
Born and raised in Friesland, Jonker had to wait 22 years for his wish to come true. Yet, on Sunday 17 February 1985, it seemed that the Elfstedentocht would not take place. Owing to a sudden thaw, the board of the Koninklijke Vereniging De Friesche Elf Steden (Royal Association of the Eleven Frisian Cities) decided to call the event off. This news reached Jonker and two hundred other skaters after they had already set off for Poland. An Alternative Elfstedentocht was scheduled to take place on Thursday 21 February in Giżycko, in the country's northeast. The buses departed from the Netherlands on the morning of Monday 18 February and reached the East German border that evening. After hours of waiting, they faced another long delay at the Polish border. The skaters did not arrive at their hotel until Tuesday morning. There, they soon learnt that the actual Elfstedentocht in the Netherlands – also scheduled for Thursday – would indeed go ahead. The skaters were eager to return home as quickly as possible, but the bus drivers refused, citing mandatory rest periods; the return journey was expected to take five days. Behind the Iron Curtain, maintaining telephone contact with those back home proved difficult. Eventually, at 5:00 p.m. on Tuesday, one bus set off back to the Netherlands. Jonker managed to secure a seat, and following a long return trip – which again included waiting times at both border crossings – he arrived in Friesland on the morning of Wednesday 20 February. He braved the exhaustion and lack of sleep, arriving at the starting line early Thursday morning and finishing in fifteenth place. In January 2011, the programme Andere Tijden produced a documentary about the story of the bus journey to Poland.

=== Elfstedentocht 1986 ===
Jonker's hope for a second chance was realized the next year, when the Elfstedentocht took place on 26 February 1986. He was in good form; on 25 January, he had finished sixth in the Dutch national marathon speed skating championships on artificial ice. On 15 February 1986, he had taken second place in the Oldambtrit, a classic long-distance race held on natural ice. During the Elfstedentocht, Jonker broke away from the lead group about thirty kilometres before the finish line. He reached the front alongside the eventual winner, Evert van Benthem. Just before reaching Dokkum, Jonker fell, and a camera motorcycle belonging to the NOS (Dutch public broadcaster) ran over him. He managed to catch up with Van Benthem, and the two skated together at the front for many kilometres. Exhausted, he was forced to let Van Benthem pull away seven kilometres from the end, just before the village of Oudkerk. Jonker finished in second place, one minute and ten seconds behind the winner.

=== Later career ===
By the time that the 1997 Elfstedentocht took place, Jonker had not competed among the top-tier (A-category) skaters for several years. Nevertheless, at the age of 46, he returned to the competitive field and secured 25th place in what was his third Elfstedentocht. Jonker won the Dutch national marathon skating championships on artificial ice in the veterans' category in 1993, 1998, and 2000. In 1994, he won the unofficial world championship for veterans, held at the Weißensee in Austria.

== Personal bests ==
Distance	Time	Date	Track
500 m	45.80	8 February 1981	(Netherlands) Heerenveen
1 500 m	2:14.80	4 March 1980	(Netherlands) Heerenveen
3 000 m	4:47.20	22 February 1980	(Netherlands) Heerenveen
5 000 m	8:13.10	4 March 1980	(Netherlands) Heerenveen
10 000 m	15:24.10	2 March 1987	(Netherlands) Heerenveen

== Marathon speed skating results ==
=== Results in major competitions ===
Year	NK artificial ice	NK natural ice	Open NK natural ice	Jaap Eden Trophy	KNSB Cup standing	Alternative Elfstedentocht	Elfstedentocht
1981						13th	
1982	17th				23rd		
1983						6th	
1984	22nd				19th	5th	
1985		15th	16th	11th			15th
1986	6th	opgave			14th		2nd place, silver medalist(s)
1987	19th						
1988	19th			16th		3rd place, bronze medalist(s)	
1989							
1990				12th			
1991	10th	26th			13th	13th	
1992						10th, 11th	
1993						15th	
1994						23rd	
1995						13th	
1996						15th	
1997			16th				25th
1998						35th	

=== Results in natural-ice classics ===
Year	De 100 van Eernewoude	Amstelmeer Marathon	Noordwest- hoekrit	Oldambt- rit	Hollands Venetiëtocht	Klassieker Cup
1980	18th					
1985			4th			
1986	10th			2nd place, silver medalist(s)		
1987		8th		2nd place, silver medalist(s)		
1991	15th		8th		22nd	
1996			9th			32nd
1997		21st				

=== Results for veteran speed skating ===
1993
(gold) NK veterans on artificial ice
1994
(gold) Unofficial WK veterans' marathon
1997
(silver) NK veterans on natural ice
1998
(gold) NK veterans on artificial ice
1999
(bronze) NK veterans on artificial ice
2000
(gold) NK veterans on artificial ice
