= Bert Aipassa =

Dutch footballer

Personal information
- Date of birth: 7 December 1969 (age 56)
- Place of birth: Voorthuizen, Netherlands
- Position: Defender

Youth career
- VVOP

Senior career*
Years	Team	Apps	(Gls)
1990–1994	Utrecht	23	(1)
1994	→ Haarlem (loan)	1	(0)
1995–1999	Holland		
1999–2001	Hilversum		
2007–2008	Nijenrodes		
2008–2010	Chabab		
- * Club domestic league appearances and goals

Bert Aipassa (born 7 December 1969) is a Dutch retired footballer.

== Career ==
After making 23 league appearances for Utrecht in the Dutch top flight, Aipassa was sent on loan to Haarlem and then got sentenced to one year in prison for driving from a fatal car accident. Following his release, he played in the Dutch lower leagues for Breukelen and Chabab.
