= Hans Smalhout =

Dutch ice hockey player

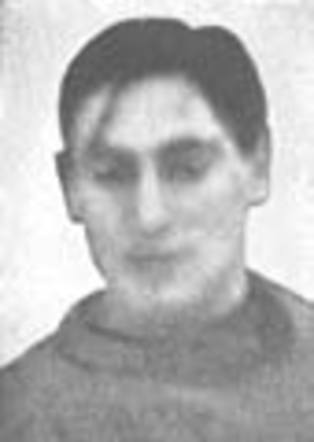
- Born: 31 December 1920 Velsen-Noord, Netherlands
- Died: 31 October 1942 (aged 21) Auschwitz concentration camp, Poland
- Position: Right wing
- Played for: Den Haag
- National team: Netherlands
- Playing career: 1937–1940

Hans Henri Smalhout (31 December 1920 – 31 October 1942) was a Dutch professional ice hockey right wing who played for the Dutch national ice hockey team. He appeared in the 1939 Ice Hockey World Championship. Smalhout, who was Jewish, was arrested and killed in the Auschwitz concentration camp in 1942.

== Career statistics ==
=== Club career ===
| | | | Regular season | | | | | Playoffs |
| Season | Team | League | GP | G | A | Pts | PIM | GP | G | A | Pts | PIM |
|---|---|---|---|---|---|---|---|---|---|---|---|---|
| 1937–38 | Den Haag | NIJB | – | – | – | – | – | – | – | – | – | – |
| 1938–39 | Den Haag | NIJB | 2 | 0 | 0 | 0 | – | – | – | – | – | – |
| 1939–40 | Den Haag | NIJB | 2 | 0 | – | – | – | – | – | – | – | – |
| Club career totals | | | 4 | 0 | 0 | 0 | – | – | – | – | – | – |

=== International career ===
| | | | Regular season | | | | | Playoffs |
| Season | Team | Competition | GP | G | A | Pts | PIM | GP | G | A | Pts | PIM |
|---|---|---|---|---|---|---|---|---|---|---|---|---|
| 1938–39 | Netherlands | World Championships | 2 | 0 | – | – | – | – | – | – | – | – |
| 1938–39 | Netherlands | International Matches | 1 | – | – | – | – | – | – | – | – | – |
| International career totals | | | 3 | 0 | – | – | – | – | – | – | – | – |
