= Klasina Seinstra =

Dutch speed skater and coach (born 1968)

Personal information
- Born: 26 March 1968 (age 58) Luxwoude, Friesland, Netherlands
- Years active: 1994–1999

Sport
- Sport: Marathon speed skating
- Events: Artificial ice Natural ice
Medal record
(gold) Women's 15th Elfstedentocht

Klasina Seinstra (born 26 March 1968) is a Dutch long-distance speed skater and speed skating coach.

== Biography ==
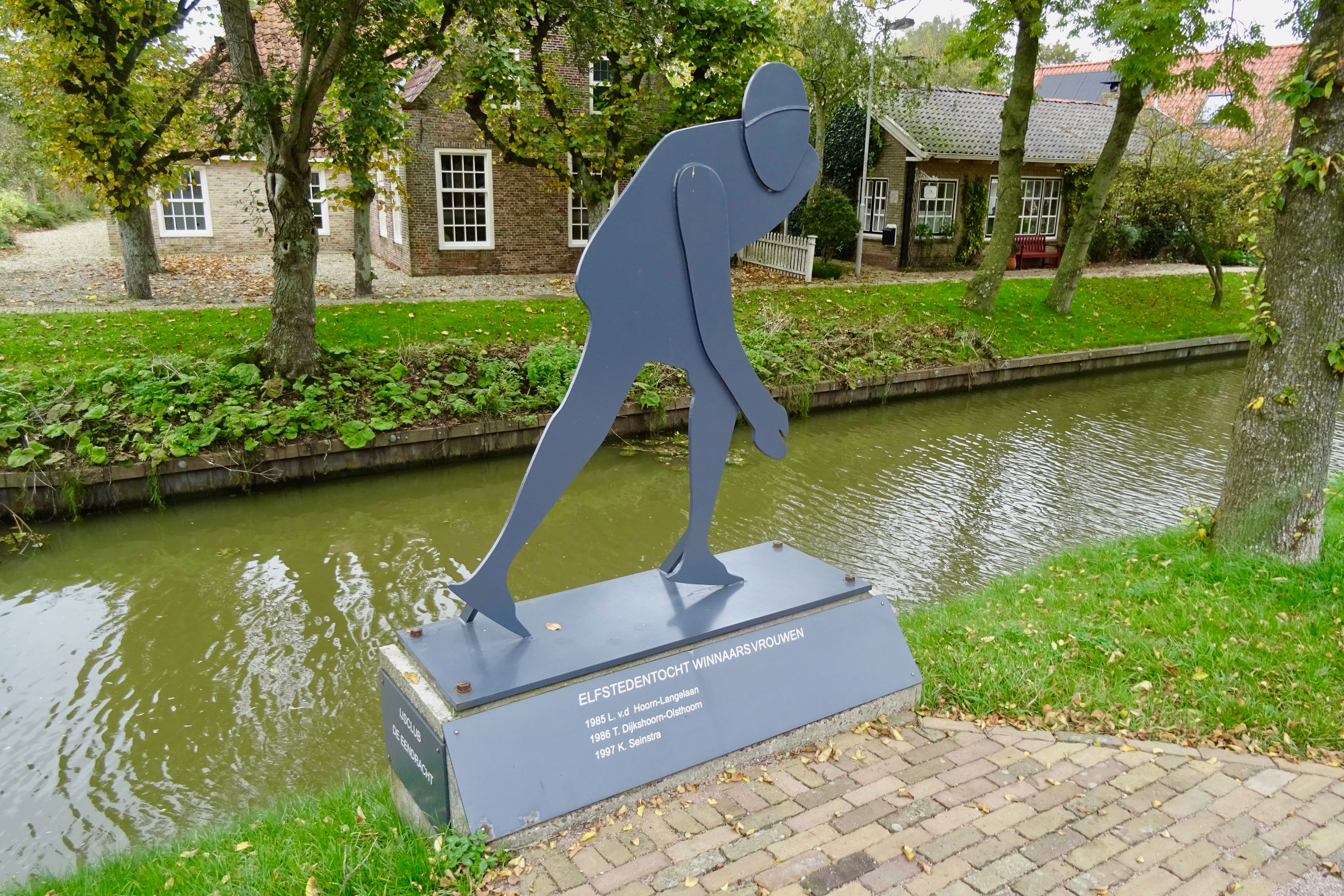
Sculpture in Alde Leie, honouring the winners of the Elfstedentocht: Lenie van der Hoorn (1985), Tineke Dijkshoorn (1986), and Klasina Seinstra (1997)

At the age of 28, Seinstra took part in the Fifteenth Elfstedentocht and finished as the first woman. In the last stretch on the Bonkevaart (canal), she managed to beat 20-year-old Gretha Smit. The race did not yet have a separate category for women; so Seinstra was not an official winner of the event. Afterwards, she spontaneously stepped onto the podium alongside the winner, Henk Angenent, wearing the winner's wreath. It turned out later that she was pregnant during the race.

On 18 January 2021, Klasina Seinstra, along with the women who finished first in 1985 (Lenie van der Hoorn) and 1986 (Tineke Dijkshoorn), were belatedly honoured as winners. They received a certificate and a vase depicting the route from the chairman of the Royal Association De Friesche Elf Steden (The Frisian Eleven Cities). Their names have been added to the Elfstedenrijder monument in Leeuwarden. and her name and photograph also appear on the Elfstedenmonument in Bartlehiem. On 9 September 2017, Seinstra also unveiled an Eleven Cities Monument in Vrouwenparochie. Her name is featured on that monument as well.

On 1 February 1997, she also finished first among the women in the Alternative Elfstedentocht on the Weißensee, a feat she had previously accomplished in 1995 and 1996, and would go on to achieve for a fourth time in 1999. On 8 February 1997, she secured her second Open Dutch Championship title in marathon speed skating on natural ice. She had also won this title in 1996; in both instances, the event took place in Austria on the Plansee, near Reutte. On 28 December 1996, Seinstra won the Dutch marathon speed skating title on artificial ice in Utrecht.

After her active speed skating career, Seinstra became a team manager for marathon skating squads, specifically the Frisia team and Zuidema-Kranen. During the 2006/2007 season, she served as a coach for Team Asics/Right to Play, alongside Falko Zandstra. Subsequently, she taught ice skating lessons at the Elfstedenhal in Leeuwarden.

== Palmares ==
- De 100 van Eernewoude (50/60 km): 1994 and 1996
- The Alternative Elfstedentocht on the Weißensee (Austria): 1995, 1996, 1997 and 1999
- ONK marathon on natural ice: 1996, 1997
- Oldambtrit (60 km): 1996
- KNSB Cup: 1996, 1997 and 1999
- NK marathon on artificial ice: 1997

Seinstra also took part in the Fietselfstedentocht and, in 2009, in the Elfstedenwandeltocht (Eleven Cities Walking Tour). She thus qualified for the Elfstedenbrevet (Eleven Cities Certificate), which is awarded to anyone who has completed the route at least once by skating, cycling, and walking. By 2009, this certificate had been awarded to some 1,240 people. In April 2010, she received the certificate from the King's Commissioner for the province of Friesland.
