= Emiel Hopman =

Dutch speed skater (1963–2023)

- Emiel Hopman in 1984

Personal information
- Nicknames: De Hulk; The Marathonman
- Born: 9 May 1963 't Zand, North Holland, Netherlands
- Died: 23 June 2023 (aged 60) 't Zand, North Holland, Netherlands
- Years active: 1983–1988

Sport
- Sport: Long-track speed skating Marathon speed skating

Emiel Hopman (9 May 1963 – 23 June 2023) was a Dutch marathon and long-track speed skater.

== Career ==
In the early 1980s, Hopman was highly successful. He was one of the few to secure a spot in the Royal Dutch Skating Federation (Koninklijke Nederlandsche Schaatsenrijders Bond; KNSB) core team (kernploeg) without having come up through the Jong Oranje (Dutch junior national) speed skating squad. During the 1983/1984 season, he won fifteen races, including eight in a row. These victories were often achieved in impressive fashion, frequently with a lead of several laps over the rest of the field. This style of racing and his results earned Hopman the nickname "The Hulk."

After his successful period in marathon skating, Hopman transitioned to long-track speed skating. Although he narrowly missed the podium at the 1985 Dutch All-round Championships in Alkmaar, he was selected to compete in the European Championships in Eskilstuna, Sweden, where he finished sixteenth. In the concluding 10,000-metre race, he placed third, finishing just ahead of Frits Schalij. However, further success failed to materialize, leading him to retire from the sport. Because Hopman was not a member of the association that organizes the Elfstedentocht, he was not granted an entry for the 1986 event and could therefore not participate.

In 1986, together with Geert Kuiper, he was one of the first to experiment with something that at the time was highly revolutionary: the clap skate.

== Death ==
Emiel Hopman died on 23 June 2023 at the age of 60.

== Personal bests ==
Distance	Time	Date	Track
500 m	40.3	8 January 1985	(Netherlands) Heerenveen
1500 m	1:58.93	20 January 1985	(Switzerland) Davos
3000 m	4:14.7	8 January 1985	(Netherlands) Heerenveen
5000 m	7:12.22	30 November 1986	(Netherlands) Heerenveen
10 000 m	14:45.92	17 December 1987	(Netherlands) Heerenveen

== Long-track speed skating results ==
Year	NK distance	NK all-round	NK sprint	EK all-round	WK all-round
1985		4th (5th, 2th, 4th, 4th)	9th (20th, 9th, 17th, 6th)	16th (28th, 5th, 12th, 3rd)	10th (25th, 7th, 13th, 7th)
1986			16th (11th, 21st, 22nd)		
1987	27th 500 m 14th 1500 m 10th 5000 m 12th 10 000 m	17th (18th, 14th, 17th, –)			

(#, #, #, #) = distance ranking at an all-round tournament (500 m, 5000 m, 1500 m, 10 000 m).

== Marathon speed skating results ==
=== Results in major competitions ===
Year	NK artificial ice	Jaap Eden Trophy	KNSB Cup standing	Heineken Zesdaagse	Alternative Elfstedentocht
1983	3rd place, bronze medalist(s)			4th	
1984	1st place, gold medalist(s)	3rd place, bronze medalist(s)	1st place, gold medalist(s)		
1986				15th	
1987	10th			13th	
1988			12th	15th	
1989					
1990	19th				13th

=== Medal table ===
Championship	Gold (gold)	Silver (silver)	Bronze (bronze)
NK artificial ice	1	0	1
KNSB Cup standing	1	0	0
Races on artificial ice	16	3	6
