= Evert van Benthem =

Dutch speed skater

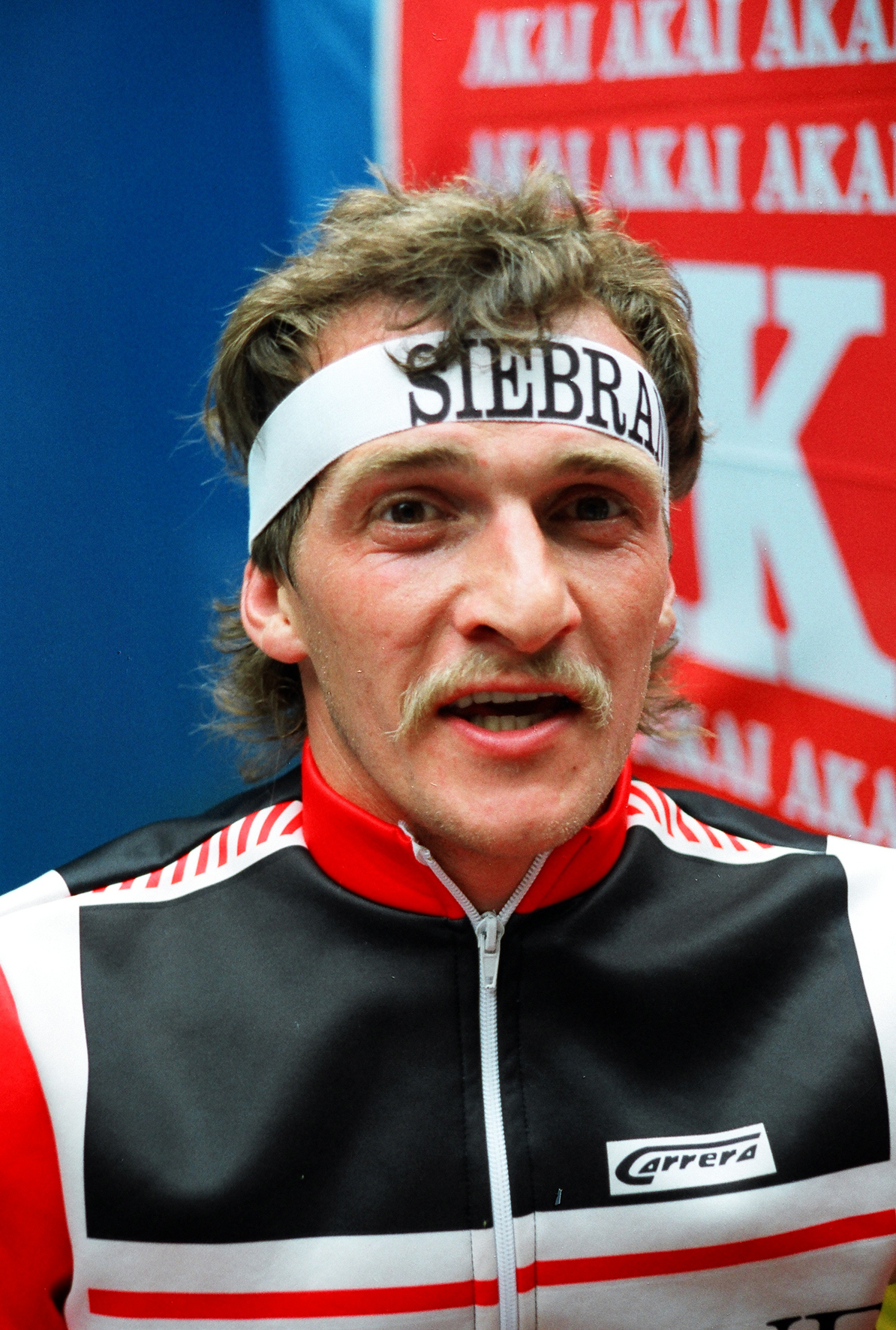
- Evert van Benthem

Personal information
- Born: 21 November 1958 (age 67) Sint Jansklooster, Netherlands

Sport
- Country: Netherlands
- Sport: Speed skating
- Retired: 1997

Achievements and titles
- Personal bests: 1985 Elfstedentocht; 1986 Elfstedentocht

Evert van Benthem (born 21 November 1958) is a Dutch former speed skater who won the rarely raced Elfstedentocht twice in a row, in 1985 and 1986.

== Early career ==
Van Benthem, a farmer from Leeuwte, near Vollenhove in The Netherlands, became involved in marathon skating in the early 1980s. He started racing in the A-class in 1983, which involved longer races (100 km instead of 40 km), and finished third in the Dutch championship in 1985.

== Elfstedentocht 1985 ==
In 1985, it had been 22 years since the last Elfstedentocht. The event is skated on natural ice in Friesland, at a distance of 196.8 kilometres (122.3 mi). On 21 February 1985, van Benthem won the 13th Elfstedentocht. Van Benthem entered the final stretch of the race into Leeuwarden together with Jan Kooiman, Jos Niesten and Henri Ruitenberg, all marathon speed skaters. Van Benthem won the sprint, completing the race in 6 hours 47 mins, an average of 29.0 kilometres per hour (18.0 mph).

== Elfstedentocht 1986 ==
One year later, on 26 February 1986, the competition was held again. The leading pack near the end of the race included, Rein Jonker, Robert Kamperman and van Benthem. Van Benthem kept the lead and won again, with a time of 6 hours 55 mins 17 secs.

== Elfstedentocht 1997 ==
The next Elfstedentocht took place in 1997, after van Benthem's retirement. He still entered the event but without trying to win, drawing much public attention. His brother, Henk van Benthem, finished fourth in the race.

== Emigration ==
In the summer of 1999 van Benthem and his family decided to move to Spruce View, Alberta, Canada. His farm in the Netherlands was located in a natural preservation area and thus could not expand. Moreover, Van Benthem said he had gotten tired of the attention. Van Benthem has a dairy farm in Spruce View, 320 hectares in size with 175 cows. An "Alternative Elfstedentocht" has been organized since 2003, but van Benthem's goal of having the Dutch top skaters regularly competing has not come to fruition.

Year	Date	Temperature	Winner (*)		Time	Distance	Average speed
1909	2 January	n/a	Minne Hoekstra		13:50	189 km	13.7 km/h
1912	7 February	3.8°C	Coen de Koning		11:40	189 km	16.2 km/h
1917	27 January	-1.8°C	Coen de Koning		9:53	189 km	19.1 km/h
1929	12 February	-10.1°C	Karst Leemburg		11:09	191 km	17.1 km/h
1933	16 December	-2.0°C	Abe de Vries; Sipke Castelein		9:53	195 km	19.7 km/h
1940	30 January	-6.1°C	Piet Keijzer; Auke Adema; Cor Jongert; Durk van der Duim; Sjouke Westra		11:34	198.5 km	17.3 km/h
1941	7 February	0.0°C	Auke Adema		9:19	198.5 km	21.3 km/h
1942	22 January	-11.7°C	Sietze de Groot		8:44	198 km	22.7 km/h
1947	8 February	-8.5°C	Jan W. van der Hoorn		10:51	191 km	17.6 km/h
1954	3 February	-5.4°C	Jeen van den Berg		7:35	198.5 km	26.2 km/h
1956	14 February	-4.9°C	no winner declared (**)		—	190.5 km	—
1963	18 January	-7.7°C	Reinier Paping		10:59	196.5 km	17.9 km/h
			Winner men	Winner women (*)			
1985	21 February	0.3°C	Evert van Benthem	Lenie van der Hoorn	6:47	196.8 km	29.0 km/h
1986	26 February	-6.9°C	Evert van Benthem	Tineke Dijkshoorn	6:55	199.3 km	28.8 km/h
1997	4 January	-3.6°C	Henk Angenent	Klasina Seinstra	6:49	199.6 km	29.3 km/h
"History" (in Dutch). Vereniging De Friesche Elf Steden [Association of the Eleven Fries Cities].; * Women were first allowed to take part in the tour proper in 1985; before then they had to skate with the amateurs and no award was given. ** After shared wins in 1933 and 1940, when the front-runners decided not to compete but join hands to cross the line together, this practice was forbidden by the organisation. Jan van der Hoorn, Aad de Koning, Jeen Nauta, Maus Wijnhout and Anton Verhoeven however ignored this rule when they crossed the finish line in unison. They were not disqualified, but no winner was declared.: "3,000 Skaters in 124-mile race". The Times. No. 48527. London. 31 January 1940. col. B, p. 7.
