= Kluning =

Walking over land on ice skates

Kluning is the act of walking over land on ice skates. The word is derived from the Frisian word klune.

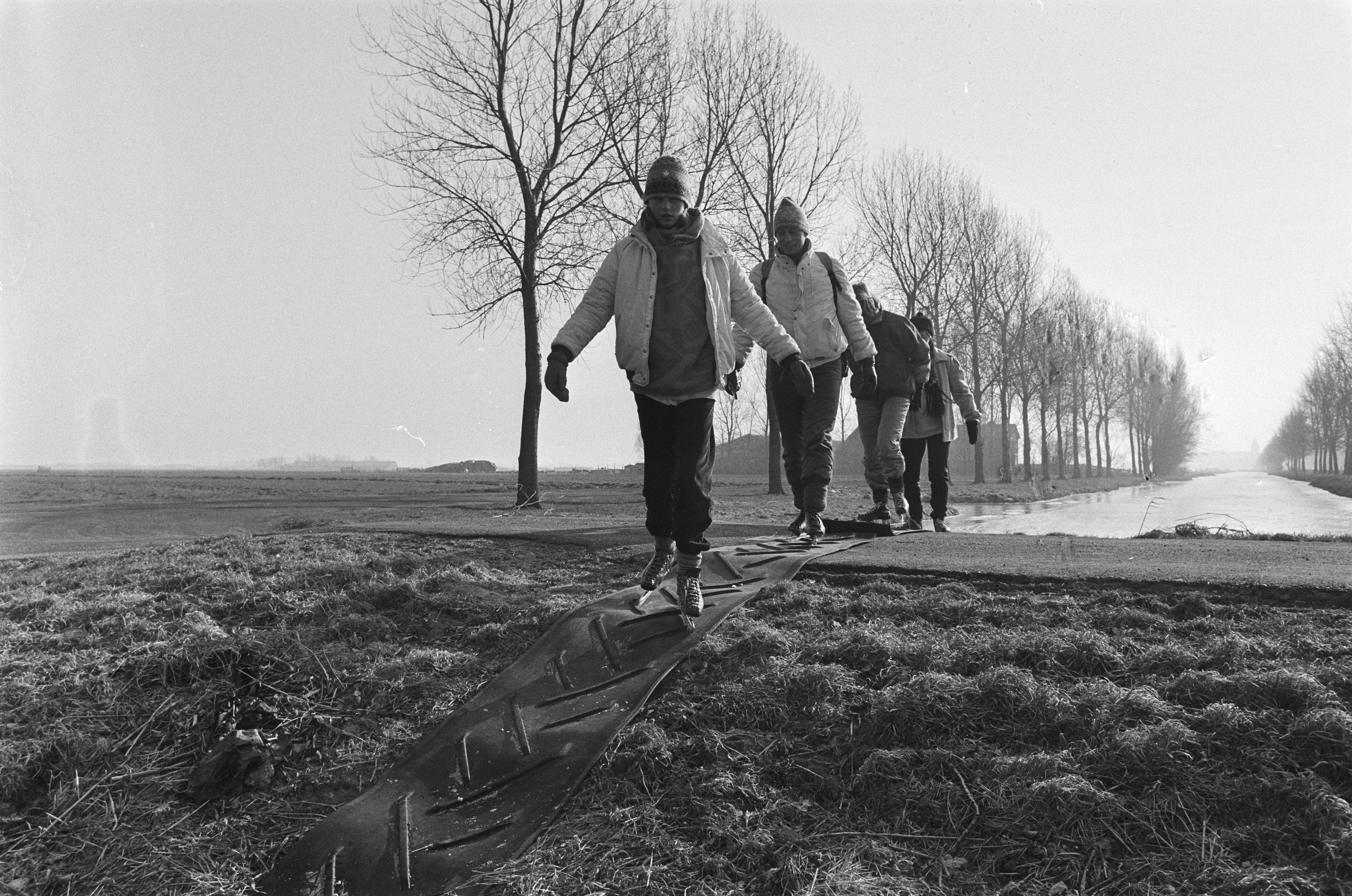

In tour skating it is not always possible to travel the entire distance by skate. The ice under bridges might be too thin or kept open for transportational purposes. In this case, the skater is forced to take off his skates, walk a certain distance and put his skates back on to carry on his trip. 'Kluning' however makes it possible to win time by walking the distance on land on skates. Planks or mats are placed in advance, to avoid damage to the blades.
