= Elfstedentocht =

Dutch long-distance skating event

- Most recent season or competition: 1997
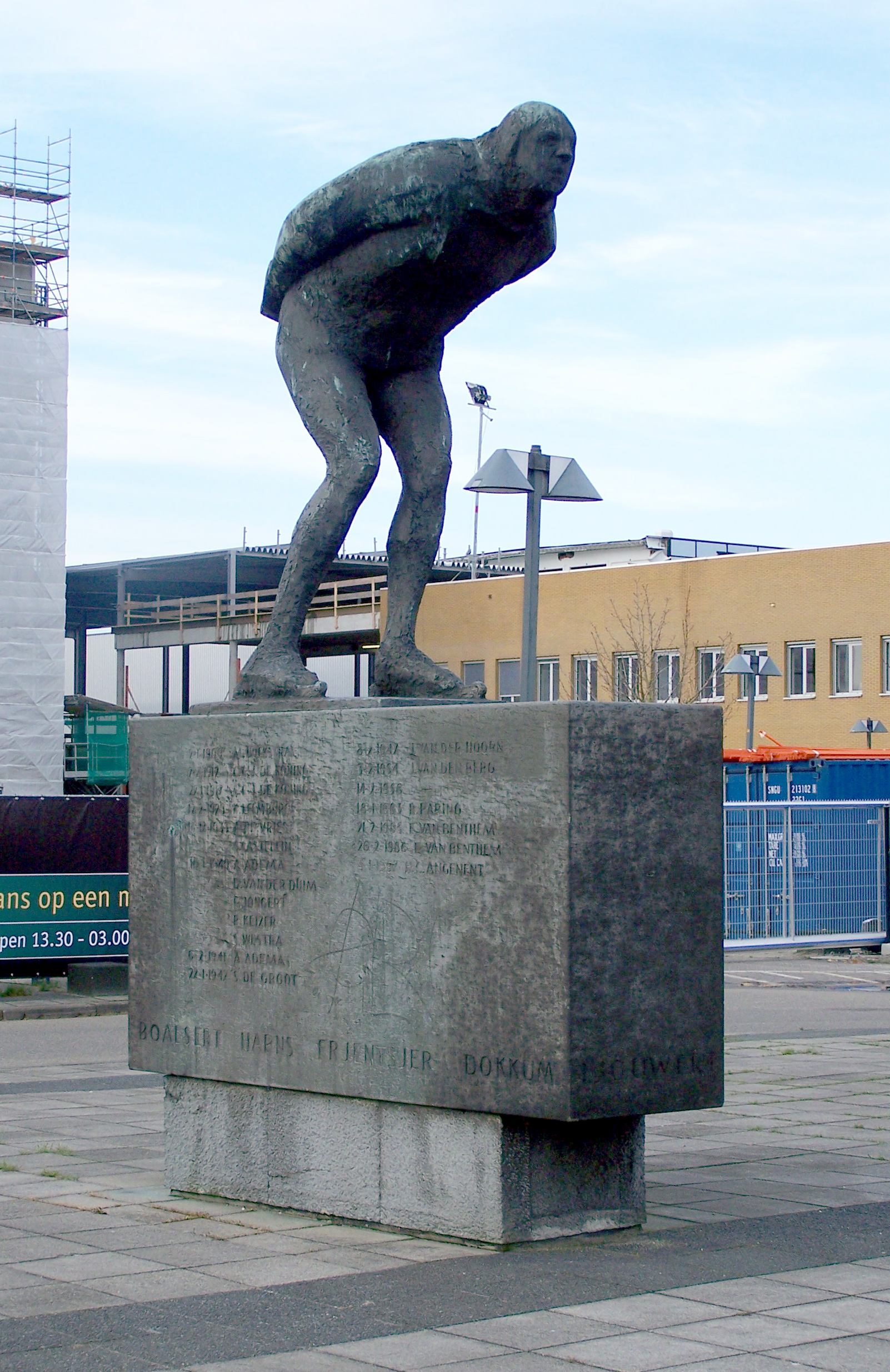
- Statue in Leeuwarden of an Elfstedentocht competitor. The eleven cities and all the winners are listed on the plinth
- Sport: Tour skating and speed skating
- Founded: 1909; 117 years ago
- Countries: World

The Elfstedentocht (Dutch pronunciation: [ɛl(ə)fˈsteːdə(n)tɔxt]; West Frisian: Alvestêdetocht [ɔlvəˈstɛːdətɔχt]; lit. 'eleven cities tour') is a long-distance tour skating event on natural ice, almost 200 kilometres (120 mi) long, which is held both as a speed skating competition (with 300 contestants) and a leisure tour (with 16,000 skaters). The Elfstedentocht is the biggest ice-skating tour in the world.

The tour is held in the province of Friesland in the north of the Netherlands, leading past all eleven historical cities of the province. The tour is held at most once a year, only when the natural ice along the entire course is at least 15 centimetres (6 in) thick; sometimes on consecutive years, other times with gaps that may exceed 20 years. When the ice is suitable, the tour is announced and starts within 48 hours.

The Elfstedentocht has been declared to be in danger of "extinction" due to climate change. In the past 50 years, the Elfstedentocht has taken place only three times, most recently in 1997.

== Course and rules ==
The tour, almost 200 km (125 miles) in length, follows a closed or circular route along frozen canals, rivers and lakes visiting the eleven historic Frisian cities: Leeuwarden, Sneek, IJlst, Sloten, Stavoren, Hindeloopen, Workum, Bolsward, Harlingen, Franeker, Dokkum, then returning to Leeuwarden. The tour is held only if the ice is, and remains, at least 15 centimetres (6") thick along the entire course as about 15,000 amateur skaters take part, putting high requirements on the quality of the ice. The last tours were held in 1985, 1986 and 1997. All skaters must be members of the Association of the Eleven Frisian Towns. A starting permit and bib is required (€100 in 2017). Skaters must collect a stamp in each city, and at three secret check points, and must finish the course before midnight.

There are often points along the route where the ice is too thin to allow mass skating; they are called "kluning points" (from West Frisian klúnje meaning to run on skates over a carpet), and the skaters walk on their skates to the next stretch of good ice. In 1997 ice-transplantation was re-introduced to strengthen weak places in the ice, for instance under bridges.

The finishing point of the Elfstedentocht is a canal near Leeuwarden, called the "Bonkevaart", close to the landmark windmill, De Bullemolen, Lekkum.

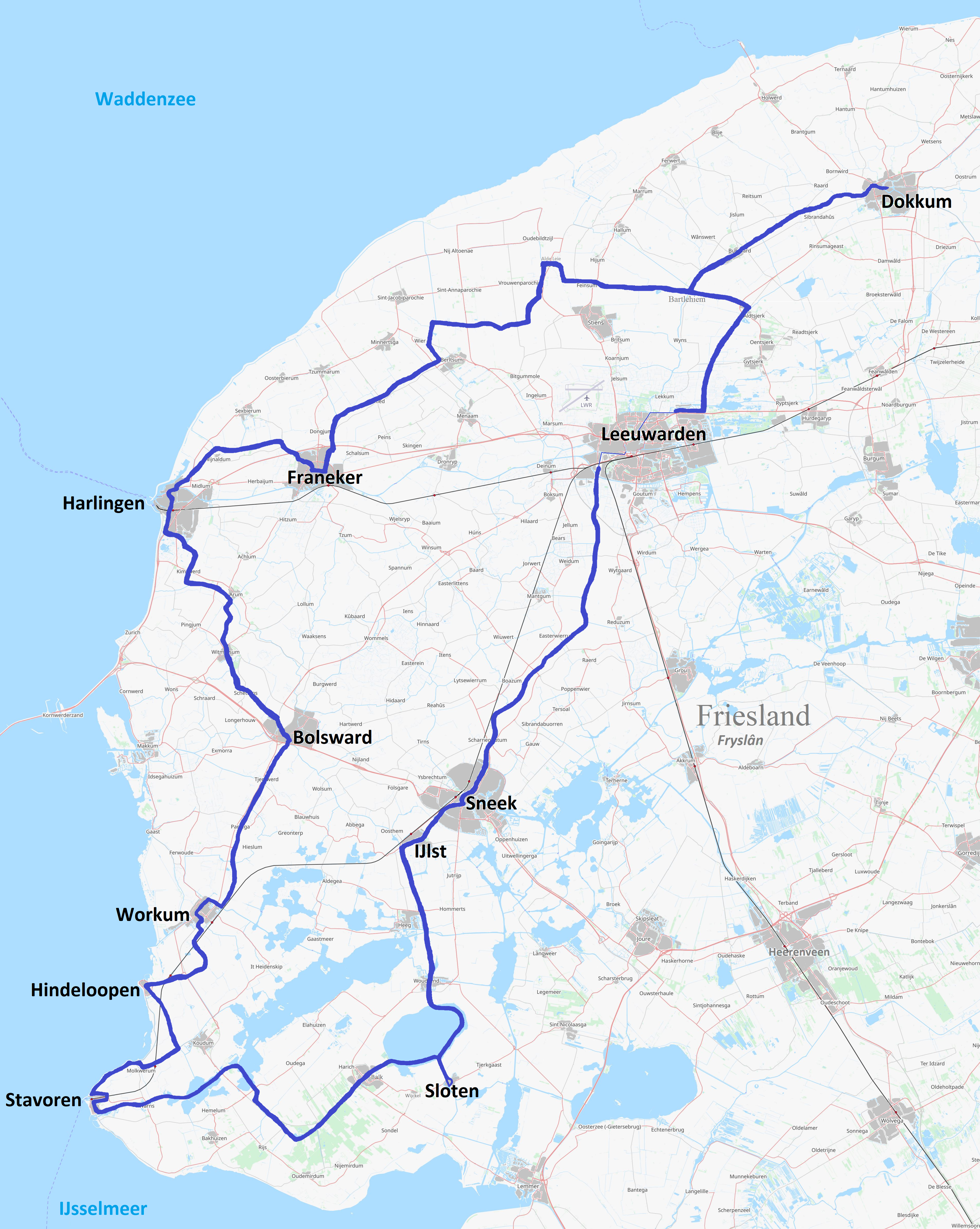
Elfstedentocht map

=== Route table ===
City	Frisian Name	Distance from Start (km)
Leeuwarden (start)	Ljouwert	0
Sneek	Snits	22
IJlst	Drylts	26
Sloten	Sleat	40
Stavoren	Starum	66
Hindeloopen	Hylpen	77
Workum	Warkum	86
Bolsward	Boalsert	99
Harlingen	Harns	116
Franeker	Frjentsjer	129
Dokkum	Dokkum	174
Leeuwarden (finish)	Ljouwert	199

== Planning and publicity ==
Since the Elfstedentocht is such a rare event, its declaration creates excitement all over the country. In the build-up to a possible race in 2012, Mark Rutte, the Dutch Prime Minister remarked "once every fifteen years our country is not governed from The Hague but by twenty-two district heads in Friesland. And our country is in good hands." As soon as a few days pass with below-freezing temperatures, the media start speculating about the chances for an Elfstedentocht. The longer the freezing temperatures stay, the more intense this Elfstedenkoorts (eleven cities fever) gets, culminating in a national near-frenzy when it is announced that the tour will actually be held. The day before the tour many Dutch flock to Leeuwarden to enjoy the party atmosphere that surrounds the event; that evening, called the "Nacht van Leeuwarden" (Night of Leeuwarden), becomes a giant street party (Frisians, who have a reputation for surliness, are said to thaw when it freezes).

On the day of the tour many Dutch either stay at home to watch it on television (9.2 million viewers by one estimate), or find a place along the route to cheer the skaters on, either taking the day off or calling in sick for work. In February 2012, Friesland hotels were fully booked and expecting between 1.5 and 2 million visitors in anticipation of a tour before it was announced, as the weather seemed suitable.

== History ==
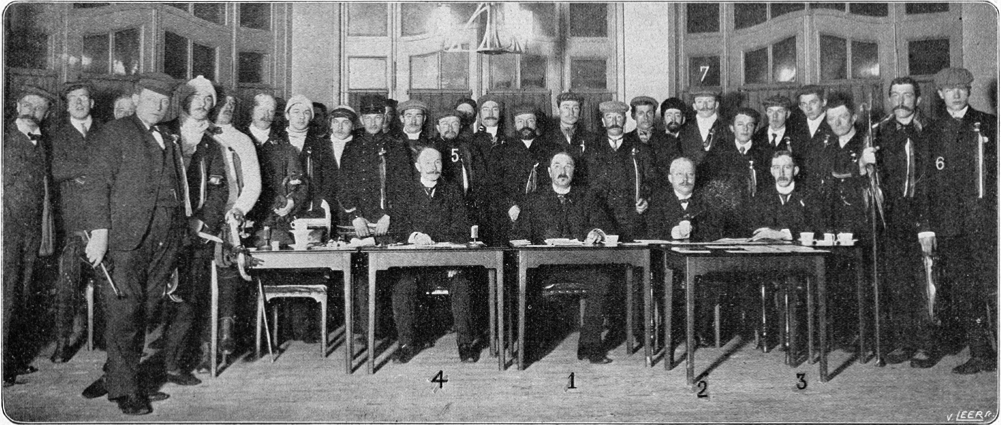
Competitors of the first (1909) Elfstedentocht

There has been mention of skaters visiting all eleven cities of Friesland on one day since 1760. The Elfstedentocht was already part of Frisian tradition when, in 1890, Pim Mulier conceived the idea of an organised tour, which was first held in 1909 when 22 men competed. After this race, the Vereniging De Friesche Elf Steden (Association of the Eleven Frisian Towns) was established to organise the tours.

In the 1912 edition Jikke Gaastra was the first woman ever who finished the Elfstedentocht, but could not complete the full tour because the ice was not good enough after Sneek. In the 1917 edition Janna van der Weg was the first woman who finished the tour.

Video of the Elfstedentocht of 1954 (commentary in Dutch)

The winters of 1939/40, 1940/41 and 1941/42 were particularly severe, with the race being run in each of them. The 1940 race, run three months prior to the German invasion of the Netherlands, saw over 3,000 competitors start at 05:00 on 30 January, with the first five finishing at 16:34. The event dominated the front pages of Dutch newspapers.

The Elfstedentocht of 1963 became known as "The hell of '63" when only 69 of the 10,000 participants were able to finish the race, due to the extremely low temperatures of −18 °C (0 °F), powder snow and a harsh eastern wind. Conditions were so horrendous that the 1963 winner, Reinier Paping, became a national hero, and the tour itself legendary. Paping could not make out the finishing line as he was snow blind by the end of the race, and many of the contestants had frostbite, broken limbs, and damaged eyes.

The next Elfstedentocht after 1963 was held in 1985; times had changed. Before, one of the best methods to stay warm during the tour was to wear newspapers underneath the clothes. In the 20 years between the tours of 1963 and 1985, clothing, training methods and skates became much more advanced, changing the nature of skating.

The tour of 1985 was terminated prematurely because of thawing; as early as 22:00 in the evening skaters were taken off the ice. In 1986 Crown Prince (now King) Willem-Alexander completed the Elfstedentocht under the name 'W. A. van Buren', Van Buren being a traditional pseudonym of the royal house. In 1997 Piet Kleine, who had previously won a gold medal at the Olympics for speed skating, was disqualified because he missed getting a stamp at Hindeloopen despite video evidence that he had been there.

=== Elfstedentocht 2012 – the race that did not happen ===
The ten-day cold spell in late January and early February 2012, the 33rd such occurrence since 1901 when temperatures as low as −22.9 °C (−9.2 °F) were recorded in Lelystad, heightened the expectation of a 2012 Elfstedentocht – the expected day of the event, had it taken place, was Saturday 11 February.

On 2 February 2012, it was reported that 95% of various locks that controlled the water flow in the canals had been adjusted to maximise the ice thickness. On the same day, the Royal Netherlands Meteorological Institute (KNMI) forecast that temperatures would not rise above freezing until Wednesday 8 February at the earliest and that the thickness of the ice would be 15 cm (5.9 in) from Tuesday 7 February until Saturday 11 February. On 3 February, the KNMI forecast a probable ice-thickness of 20 cm (7.9 in) on Saturday 11 February and on 5 February they forecast an ice thickness approaching 25 cm (9.8 in).

On 6 February it was announced that the committee had met the previous evening for the first time in fifteen years. Although there were areas where the ice was not thick enough for the race to be held, the forecast for continuing freezing weather meant that they were optimistic that the race would be held. A press conference was held at 09:30 CET and the committee was due to meet again on 8 February. At the press conference, it was stated that in north Friesland the ice conditions were suitable to hold the race. In south west Friesland, the conditions were not so good, Stavoren being a particular problem where the ice was only 2 cm (0.79 in) thick in places.

On 6 February a prohibition order on navigation on many of the canals in Friesland was extended in order to facilitate the growth of the ice. The following day the KNMI forecast that the cold spell would break on Sunday 12 February or Monday 13 February with the temperature rising above freezing point.

Late afternoon on the 8 February Wiebe Wieling, chairman of the organising committee, said that the race was off – the committee had to be realistic – safety issues had made the race impossible. A ten-day cold spell was insufficient for the event; the 1997 event had taken place at the end of a 12-day cold spell.

=== Winners ===
The time taken for the winner to complete the course is given in hours and minutes. Although temperatures were sometimes above freezing on the day of the tour, all tours were preceded by many days of below-freezing temperatures.

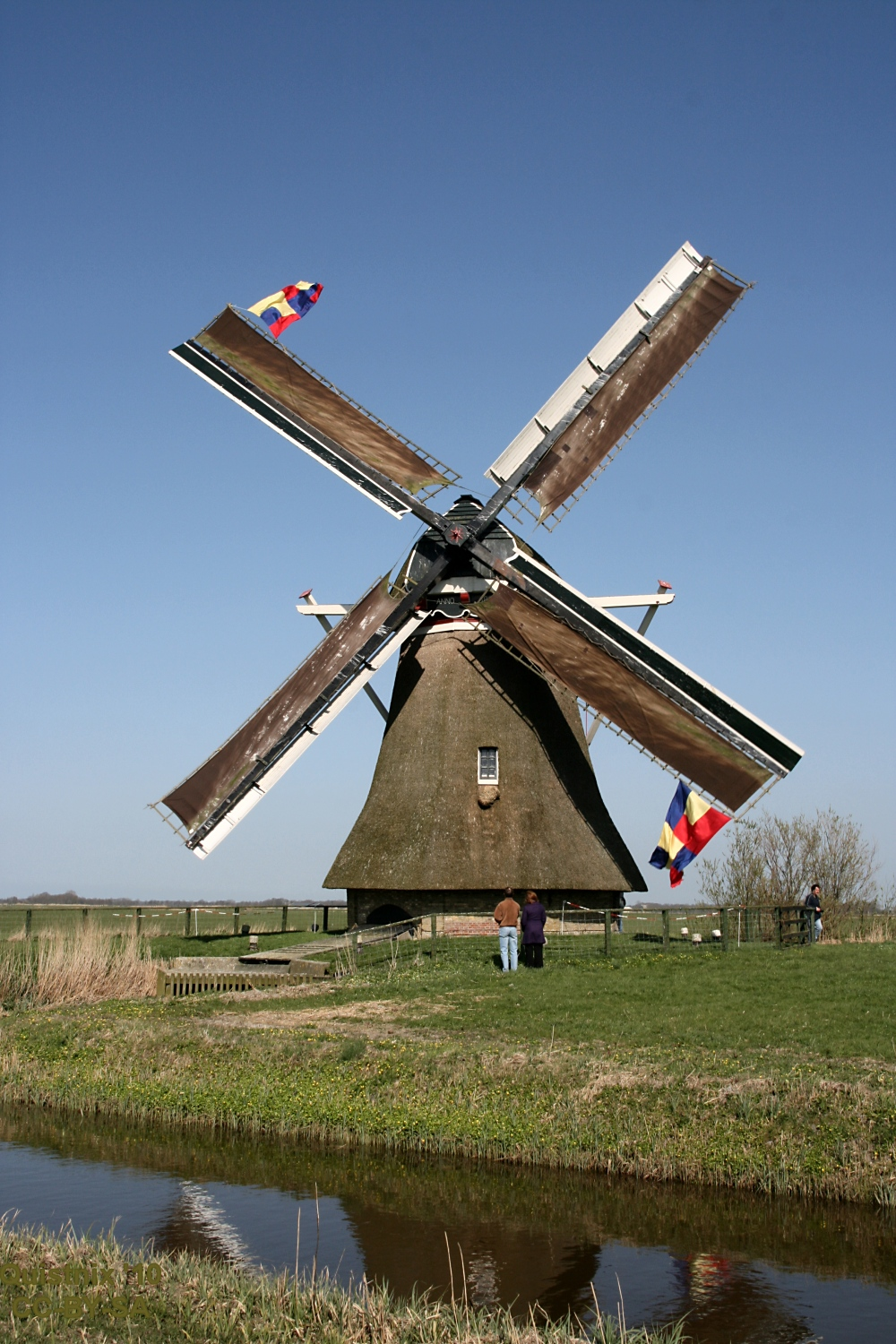
De Bullemolen, along the canal "Ouddeel", near the finishing point of the Elfstedentocht

Date	Temperature (Note: Mean temperatures at de Kooy, one of three Dutch meteorological stations for which records go back to 1910.)	Winner	Time	Distance	Average speed	Years since previous tour
2 January 1909	n/a	Minne Hoekstra	13:50	189 km	13.7 km/h	—
7 February 1912	+3.8 °C	Coen de Koning	11:40	189 km	16.2 km/h	3
27 January 1917	−1.8 °C	Coen de Koning	9:53	189 km	19.1 km/h	5
12 February 1929	−10.1 °C	Karst Leemburg	11:09	191 km	17.1 km/h	12
16 December 1933	−2.0 °C	Abe de Vries and Sipke Castelein	9:05	195 km	19.7 km/h	5
30 January 1940	−6.1 °C	Piet Keijzer, Auke Adema, Cor Jongert, Durk van der Duim and Sjouke Westra	11:34	198.5 km	17.3 km/h	6
7 February 1941	0.0 °C	Auke Adema	9:19	198.5 km	21.3 km/h	1
22 January 1942	−11.7 °C	Sietze de Groot	8:44	198 km	22.7 km/h	1
8 February 1947	−8.5 °C	Jan W. van der Hoorn	10:51	191 km	17.6 km/h	5
3 February 1954	−5.4 °C	Jeen van den Berg	7:35	198.5 km	26.2 km/h	7
14 February 1956	−4.9 °C	no winner declared (Note: After shared wins in 1933 and 1940, when the front-runners decided not to compete but join hands to cross the line together, this practice was forbidden by the organisation. Jan J. van der Hoorn, Aad de Koning, Jeen Nauta, Maus Wijnhout and Anton Verhoeven however ignored this rule when they crossed the finish line in unison. They were not disqualified, but no winner was declared.)	—	190.5 km	—	2
18 January 1963	−7.7 °C	Reinier Paping	10:59	196.5 km	17.9 km/h	7
21 February 1985	+0.3 °C	Evert van Benthem	6:47	196.8 km	29.0 km/h	22
26 February 1986	−6.9 °C	Evert van Benthem	6:55	199.3 km	28.8 km/h	1
4 January 1997	−3.6 °C	Henk Angenent	6:49	199.6 km	29.3 km/h	11
Present	—	—	—	—	—	29

Women were first allowed to take part in the tour proper in 1985; before then they had to skate with the amateurs and no award was given. The women to cross the finish line first were:

- 1940 – Sjoerdtsje Faber
- 1941 – Wopkje Kooistra
- 1942 – Antje Schaap
- 1985 – Lenie van der Hoorn
- 1986 – Tineke Dijkshoorn
- 1997 – Klasina Seinstra (7:49.11)

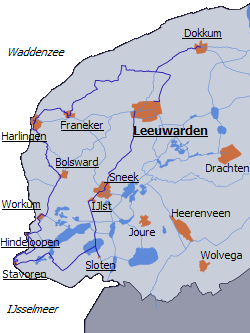
The course of the 1997 Elfstedentocht

The course can vary slightly from race to race, depending on the quality of the ice. The cumulative distance at each checkpoint in 1997 was:

- 0 km: Leeuwarden
- 22 km: Sneek
- 26 km: IJlst
- 40 km: Sloten
- 66 km: Stavoren
- 77 km: Hindeloopen
- 86 km: Workum
- 99 km: Bolsward
- 116 km: Harlingen
- 129 km: Franeker
- 174 km: Dokkum
- 199 km: Leeuwarden

== Similar events ==
=== Alternative Elfstedentocht ===
An "alternative Elfstedentocht" has been held every year in January since 1989 on the Weissensee in Carinthia, Austria.

The 930 mAA (3051 ft) lake is 12 km long (7 miles) and around 3000 speed skaters do either the 50, 100 or 200 km (30, 60 or 125 mile) course at what is likely to be the world's largest ice sport event.

The Dutch Speed Skating Championship is part of the event and the fastest competitors do the 200 kilometre (125 mile) course in just over five hours.

=== Fietselfstedentocht (Eleven towns by bicycle) ===
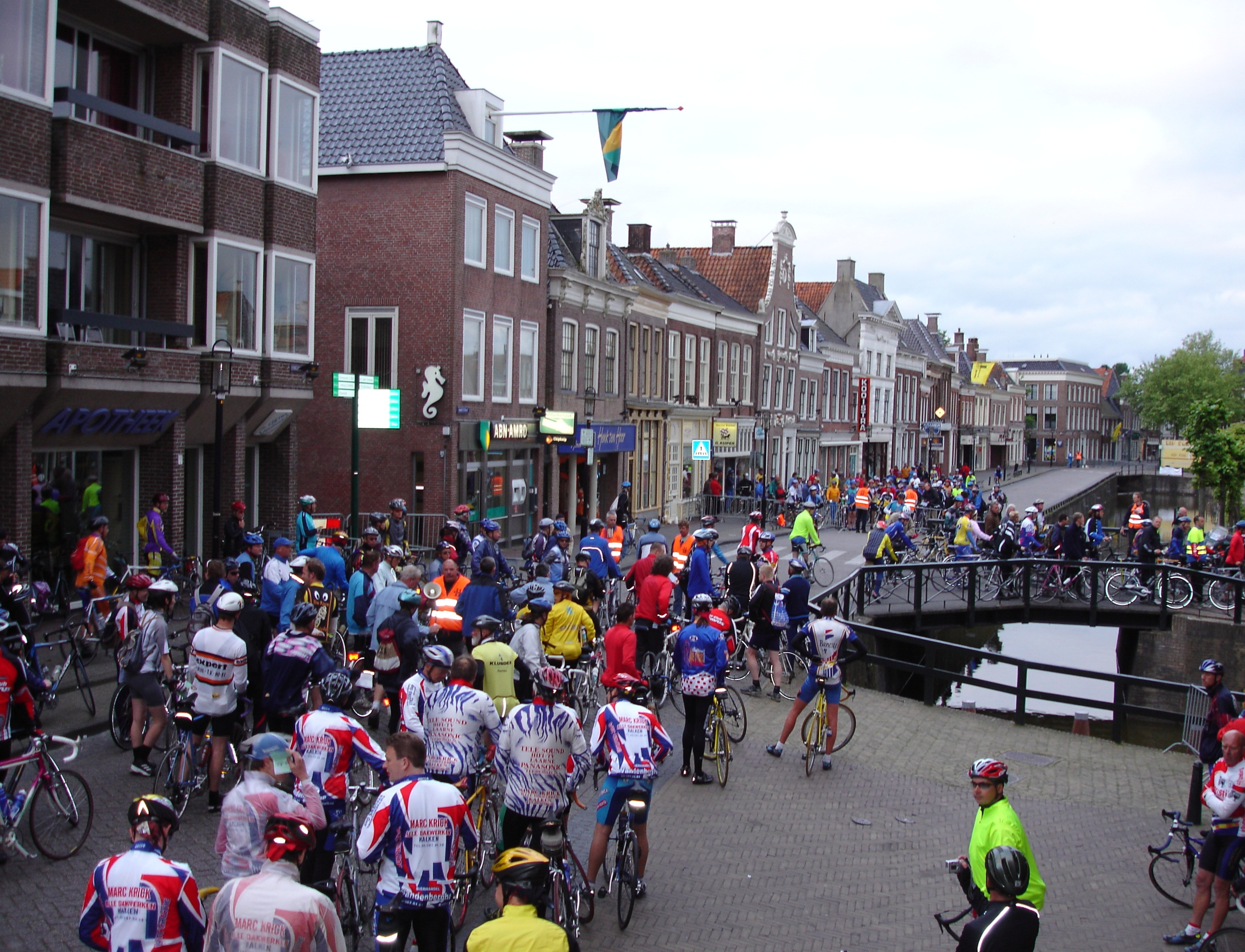
Departure of the Elfstedentocht cycling tour in 2006

The eleven towns cycle race was first held in 1912 and developed in parallel with its skating counterpart, but unlike the skating race, has taken place on almost every year - apart from the 2001 event which was cancelled due to foot and mouth disease and the 2020 event which was cancelled due to the COVID-19 pandemic, it has taken place on Whit Monday every year since 1947. The event has become immensely popular and as a safety precaution it ceased to be a race but has become a tour with a maximum average speed of 25 km/h (15 mph) between checkpoints.

The tour, which starts and ends in Bolsward rather than Leeuwarden, is currently limited to 15,000 entrants. Between 05:00 and 08:00, entrants leave Bolsward every eight minutes in batches of about 600 and those who complete the 235 km (146 mile) course before midnight receive medals.

In 2013 the organisers banned velomobiles from the event by limiting the event to two-wheeled vehicles propelled by human power.

=== Zwemelfstedentocht ===
In 2018, Dutch long-distance swimmer Maarten van der Weijden attempted to swim the entire eleven city tour. This attempt ended due to poor swimming conditions and illness from E. coli. The following summer he successfully completed the route, arriving at the finish in Leeuwarden on June 24, 2019. His effort raised over €6.1 million for cancer research.

=== Elfstedentriathlon ===
The Eleven Cities Triathlon was completed for the first time by Frisian triathlete Stefan van der Pal in 2020. Within a week he swam 200 kilometres (125 miles) (five days), then cycled the trip (7 hours) and then ran the route again (32.5 hours). He raised €96000 for a foundation that is committed to research into brain stem cancer in children.

Between June 18th and 25th 2023, Maarten van der Weijden completed the Eleven Cities Triathlon. He raised over 3 million euro for cancer research. Unlike van der Pal, who ran, van der Weijden walked the last part.
