= KNSB Dutch Marathon Championships =

Speed skating event

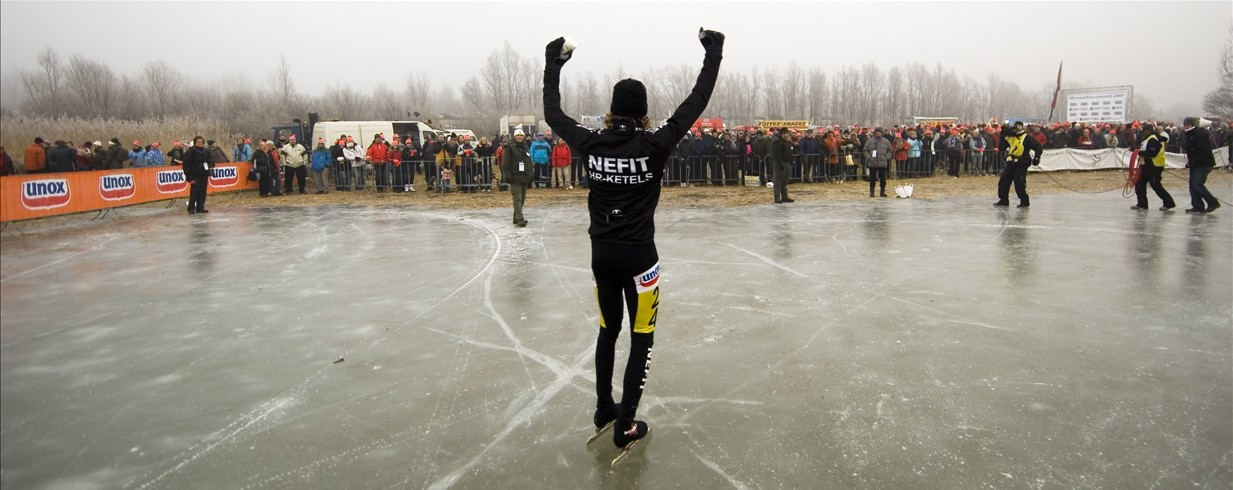
- Sjoerd Huisman 2009 champion
- Highest governing body: KNSB

Characteristics
- Mixed-sex: Yes

The Dutch Marathon Championships is a speed skating event composed of two championships. One on natural ice and one on artificial ice.

== Natural ice ==
The championship was skated for the first time in 1979. In the next 33 years the championship could be organized only 13 times. The last edition was skated in 2012 at the Grote Rietplas in Emmen. The skating event is held each winter season (if possible) and it is possible for the event to take place twice in the same year.

Dries van Wijhe and Jorrit Bergsma are the only male skaters who have won the championships twice. Alida Pasveer is the only female skater to win twice. One skater, Rudi Groenendal won the veteran's championship three times.

=== Champions ===
Edition	Date	Location	Men	Women	Masters (men)	Details
1st	18 January 1979	Loosdrechtse Plassen	Henk Portengen			
2nd	15 January 1985	Wieringen	Henri Ruitenberg	Ineke Kooiman		
3rd	11 February 1986	Giethoorn	Dries van Wijhe	Ingrid Paul	Jan Visser	
4th	16 January 1987	Earnewâld	Hilbert van der Duim	Lilian van Tol	Jan van der Meulen	
5th	7 February 1991	Ankeveen	Dries van Wijhe	Alida Pasveer	Marten Hoekstra	
6th	4 January 1993	Maasland	Erik Hulzebosch	Alida Pasveer	Robert Kamperman	
7th	21 February 1994	Giethoorn	Lammert Huitema	Laura Kamminga	Robert Kamperman	
8th	30 December 1995	Ermerzand	Yep Kramer	Gretha Smit	Kees Borst	
9th	30 December 1996	Ankeveen	Bert Verduin	Jenita Hulzebosch-Smit	Piet Manden	
10th	8 January 2009	Oostvaardersplassen	Sjoerd Huisman	Carla Zielman	Arnold Stam	
11th	10 February 2010	Zuidlaardermeer	Jorrit Bergsma	Maria Sterk	Arnold Stam	
12th	23 December 2010	Belterwiede	Bob de Vries	Foske Tamar van der Wal	Rudi Groenendal	
13th	8 February 2012	Grote Rietplas	Jorrit Bergsma	Yvonne Spigt	Rudi Groenendal	
14th	25 January 2013	Veluwemeer	Christijn Groeneveld	Mariska Huisman	Rudi Groenendal	

_{Source: Schaatsen.nl}

== Artificial ice ==
The championship was skated for the first time in 1973. The event is organized every year at an ice rink.

=== Champions ===
Edition	Year	Location	Men A	Men B	Women	Masters (men)
1st	1973		Jeen van den Berg			
2nd	1974		Ton Groot		Sofie Westenbroek	
3rd	1975		Henk Portengen		Atje Keulen-Deelstra	
4th	1976		Wout List		Atje Keulen-Deelstra	
5th	1977		Co Giling		Atje Keulen-Deelstra	Henk Borst
6th	1978		Henk Portengen		Atje Keulen-Deelstra	Hylke Speerstra
7th	1979		Rien de Roon		Ineke Kooiman	Joop Zuiker
8th	1980		Co Giling		Atje Keulen-Deelstra	Bernard v/d Heuvel
9th	1981		Co Giling		Margriet de Vries	Henk Wijnja
10th	1982		Jan Kooiman		Ineke Kooiman	Cees Molenaar
11th	1983		Jan Kooiman		Coby Borst	Kees Borst
12th	1984		Emiel Hopman		Ineke Kooiman	Cees Molenaar
13th	1985		Lex Cazemier		Linda vd berg	Cees Molenaar
14th	1986		Jan Kooiman		Coby Borst	Marten Hoekstra
15th	1987		Dirk Maarssen		Lilian van Tol	Piet de Boer
16th	1988		Jos Niesten		Lilian van Tol	Marten Hoekstra
17th	1989		Dries van Wijhe	Haico Bouma	Erna Uitham	Henk Portengen
18th	1990		Piet Kleine	Erik Hulzebosch	Boukje Keulen	Atty Duijn
19th	1991		Richard van Kempen	Ronald de Graaf	Alida Pasveer	Ben Hogemans
20th	1992		Renée Ruitenberg	Marcel Nat	Kitty Snel	Henk Portengen
21st	1993		Lammert Huitema	Conrad Alleblas	Henriette v/d Meer	Rein Jonker
22nd	1994		Lammert Huitema	Ruud Borst	Sandra Zwolle	Henk Portengen
23rd	1995		Arnold Stam	Gerwin vd Grift	Sandra Zwolle	Jan Kooiman
24th	1996		Lammert Huitema	Willem Poelstra	Marjan Mager	Marten Hoekstra
25th	1997		Peter Baars	Arjan Smit	Klasina Seinstra	Piet Lagerweij
26th	1998		Hans Pieterse	Gerben van Hest	Jenita Smit	Rein Jonker
27th	1999		Ruud Borst	Bas van Hest	Petra de Boer	Piet Lagerweij
28th	2000		Jan Maarten Heideman	Casper Helling	Gretha Smit	Rein Jonker
29th	2001		Bert Jan vd Veen	Willem Hut	Gretha Smit	Egbert Post
30th	2002		Jan Maarten Heideman	Fabian van Altena	Gretha Smit	Albert Bakker
31st	2003		Bert Jan vd Veen	Piet de Boer	Jenita Hulzebosch	Egbert Post
32nd	2004		Jan Maarten Heideman	Andre Withaar	Gretha Smit	Egbert Post
33rd	2005		Bert Jan vd Veen	Johan Boonstra	Jenita Hulzebosch	Eppie Wiersema
34th	2006	The Hague	Arjan Smit	Herjan van der Heuvel	Foske Tamar van der Wal	Arjan Bakker
35th	2007	Amsterdam	Ingmar Berga	Peter Nauta	Elma de Vries	Jurgen Meijer
36th	2008	Assen	Arjan Stroetinga	Peter van de Pol	Daniëlle Bekkering	Arjan Bakker
37th	2009		Yoeri Lissenberg	Pieter Overmars	Daniëlle Bekkering	Arjan Bakker
38th	2010		Arjan Stroetinga	Elwin Hulsink	Mariska Huisman	Kurt van de Nes
39th	2011		Arjan Stroetinga	Simon Schouten	Carla Zielman	Piet Hijlkema
40th	2012	Heerenveen	Arjan Stroetinga	Sjaak Schipper	Mariska Huisman	Rudi Groenendal
41st	2013		Ingmar Berga	Erik Jan Kooiman	Rixt Meijer	Arjan Bakker
42nd	2014	Dronten	Arjan Stroetinga	Thom van Beek	Foske Tamar van der Wal	Robert Gaasenbeek
43rd	2015	Groningen	Jorrit Bergsma	Remco Schouten	Mariska Huisman	Arjan Elferink
44th	2016	Amsterdam	Arjan Stroetinga	Luuc Bugter	Irene Schouten	Arjan Elferink

_{Source: Schaatsen.nl}
