= Lammert Huitema =

Dutch former speed skater (born 1961)

Personal information
- Years active: 1986–2003

Sport
- Sport: Marathon speed skating
- Events: Long distances Marathons

Lammert Huitema is a Dutch former marathon speed skater and cyclist. He was the Dutch marathon skating champion on artificial ice three times (1993, 1994, 1996) and also won the title on natural ice in 1994. In 1997, he added the Open Dutch Championship on natural ice to his list of victories. He won the Royal Dutch Skating Federation (Koninklijke Nederlandsche Schaatsenrijders Bond; KNSB) Cup overall standings in 1993 and 1996 and triumphed in the 1995 "Alternative Elfstedentocht" on the Weißensee. He was a regional champion fifteen times and won 26 races on artificial ice.

== Career ==
=== Early years ===
He began ice skating at the age of ten and was part of the Groningen junior squad. As a teenager, he had to undergo knee surgery owing to overuse. He could not skate for the next four years. His doctor advised him to take up cycling. He began his career as an eighteen-year-old cyclist in 1980 and started racing at the amateur level in 1982. In May 1982, he won a race in Wolfsburg, Germany, by a wide margin. He twice won the criterium in his hometown of Roden. He resumed speed skating in 1984, combining it with cycling. He achieved his first speed skating victory as a B-category skater on 23 December 1986, at the Stadspark Groningen artificial ice rink. He also competed in long-track races and won the 500 metres at the Groningen championships in January 1987. In late January 1987, he became the Groningen marathon champion in the B and C categories.

=== Rise as a B-class skater ===
At the age of 26, he began working part-time as a delivery man for a magazine rental service to allow more time for training. In 1987, he competed among the nation's top skaters for the first time. He finished fourth in the Northern Marathon Championship on 15 November 1987, placing behind winner Yep Kramer, Jan Eise Kromkamp, and Lex Cazemier, while finishing ahead of Bennie van der Weide (fifth) and Piet Kleine (sixth). Ten days later, he won his first marathon at the Stadspark in Groningen. Huitema finished second in the B-division at the Dutch artificial-ice marathon skating championships at the IJsselstadion in Deventer in January 1988, placing behind Bart Veldkamp. He travelled to Ottawa, Canada, where the unofficial marathon world championship was held on 12 February 1988. Huitema returned with the bronze medal. On 1 March 1988, he became the Groningen marathon champion.

=== Breakthrough ===
Starting in the 1988/1989 season, he competed in the A-division, though the step up proved significant during that first year. He achieved his first victory at the top level in December 1989 at the Assen marathon (held at De Bonte Wever), which counted towards the KNSB Cup. He finished fourth in the final standings of the KNSB Cup as a newcomer. During the summer of 1990, he also competed as a cyclist in criteriums, winning the race in his birthplace, Haren. However, for him, cycling was secondary to marathon speed skating. In December 1990, he surprised all the top skaters by snatching the victory in the marathon at De Meent in Alkmaar. Huitema was also the fastest in the first natural-ice marathon in Veenoord, Drenthe, on 3 February 1991.

=== Peak period ===
The best period of Huitema's career began around his thirtieth birthday in 1991. At the Dutch artificial-ice marathon skating championships held at the Eindhoven ice rink on 12 January 1991, he lost the sprint to Richard van Kempen, finishing second. Although he preferred not to skate on natural ice, he reached the podium twice in natural-ice classics that year. After winning bronze in the 100 van Eernewoude on 12 February he took silver in the Noordwesthoekrit two days later. Yep Kramer was the winner on both occasions. Huitema participated in an Alternative Elfstedentocht for the first time on 11 March 1991. He finished third in Rovaniemi, Finland, in the 200-kilometre race won by Evert van Benthem. He repeated this feat a year later, also in Rovaniemi. At the KNSB Cup in late February 1992, he reached the final podium for the first time by finishing third. Huitema won, among other events, the marathon at Thialf in Heerenveen.

=== Five national titles ===
Huitema opened his successful 1993 season on 9 January by winning the national title. At De Uithof in The Hague, he defeated Arnold Stam (second) and Henk Angenent (third). He also became the Dutch marathon champion in 1994 and 1996. In 1994, he achieved this as an independent athlete without a commercial team, though he did have a personal sponsor. The team he skated for until 1993 ceased to exist. The reason for this was that the sponsor decided they had had enough after four years. Even though he had won a national title, no team showed any interest in him. In late February 1993, he won the KNSB Cup standings for the first time. Just as at the National Championships, he relegated Stam and Angenent to the other podium spots. In 1996, he was once again the overall winner of the KNSB Cup. On 21 February 1994, he won a national title that had previously eluded him. In Giethoorn, he proved to be the strongest competitor at the Dutch National Marathon Skating Championships on natural ice. Just a few days earlier, during a training run on the Zuidlaardermeer, he had skated into an open patch of water and slid underneath the ice; he narrowly managed to save himself with the help of a training partner. Huitema further added to his list of victories by winning the Jaap Eden Trophy – the season's opening race – on 21 October 1995. Earlier that year, on 28 January, he had prevailed in the final sprint of the Alternative Elfstedentocht on the Weißensee in Austria. He achieved his last major victory on 8 February 1997, winning the Open Dutch Marathon Skating Championship on natural ice on the Plansee in Austria. With this win, he had claimed every national title. A month earlier, he had skated his first Elfstedentocht in the Netherlands, finishing in nineteenth place. He was not fond of the Elfstedentocht because of the need to skate in the dark and all the kluning.

== After skating ==
Huitema later worked as a security officer at the Veenhuizen Correctional Institution. Following his active speed skating career, he served as team manager for the Groningen-based marathon skating team "Team Selecteq" from 2004 to 2015. In May 2017, he was seriously injured in Germany after being struck by a car during the Hel van Twente recreational cycling tour. He spent a week in hospital in Nordhorn before continuing his rehabilitation at home.

== Records ==
=== Personal bests ===
| Distance | Time | Date | Track |
|---|---|---|---|
| 500 m | 42.40 | 14 March 1987 | (Netherlands) Heerenveen |
| 1000 m | 1:26.93 | 8 January 1987 | (Netherlands) Groningen |
| 1500 m | 2:05.60 | 6 December 1992 | (Netherlands) Groningen |
| 3000 m | 4:44.50 | 6 December 1984 | (Netherlands) Groningen |
| 5000 m | 7:03.30 | 29 October 2000 | (Netherlands) Groningen |
| 10 000 m | 14:39.38 | 12 March 1995 | (Netherlands) Groningen |

== Marathon speed skating results ==
=== Results in major competitions ===
| Year | NK artificial ice | NK natural ice | Open NK natural ice | WK natural ice (unofficial) | Jaap Eden Trophy | KNSB Cup standing | Heineken Zesdaagse | Alternative Elfstedentocht | Elfstedentocht |
|---|---|---|---|---|---|---|---|---|---|
| 1988 | | | | 3rd place, bronze medalist(s) | | 10th | | | |
| 1989 | | | | | | 4th | 13th | | |
| 1990 | 18th | | 34th | | 4th | 14th | | | |
| 1991 | 2nd place, silver medalist(s) | 13th | | 17th | 6th | 20th | | 3rd place, bronze medalist(s) | |
| 1992 | 16th | | 5th | | 3rd place, bronze medalist(s) | 18th | | 3rd place, bronze medalist(s) | |
| 1993 | 1st place, gold medalist(s) | withdrew | 16th | | 1st place, gold medalist(s) | 6th | | | |
| 1994 | 1st place, gold medalist(s) | 1st place, gold medalist(s) | | | 9th | 6th | | 4th, 7th | |
| 1995 | 27th | | 3rd place, bronze medalist(s) | | 4th | 1st place, gold medalist(s) | | (gold) , 8th | |
| 1996 | 1st place, gold medalist(s) | withdrew | 11th | | 1st place, gold medalist(s) | 7th | | 9th, (silver) | |
| 1997 | 15th | | 1st place, gold medalist(s) | | 3rd place, bronze medalist(s) | 17th | | 11th | 19th |
| 1998 | 19th | | 40th | | 17th | 16th | | 8th | |
| 1999 | 14th | | 31st | | 34th | | | 9th | |
| 2000 | 22nd | | 25th | | 28th | 16th | | 19th | |
| 2001 | 19th | | withdrew | | 18th | | | 17th | |
| 2002 | 50th | | | | | | | 24th | |
| 2003 | 20th | | | | 30th | | | | |

=== Results in natural-ice classics ===
| Year | De 100 van Eernewoude | Amstelmeer Marathon | Ronde van Loosdrecht | Westland Marathon | Noordwest- hoekrit | Rottemeren- tocht | Veluwemeer- tocht | Klassieker Cup |
|---|---|---|---|---|---|---|---|---|
| 1991 | 3rd place, bronze medalist(s) | | 13th | | 2nd place, silver medalist(s) | | | 9th |
| 1996 | | | | | 5th | | | 13th |
| 1997 | | 8th | | 6th | | 3rd place, bronze medalist(s) | 10th | 6th |

=== Medal table ===
| Championship | Gold | Silver | Bronze |
|---|---|---|---|
| NK artificial ice | 3 | 1 | 0 |
| NK natural ice | 1 | 0 | 0 |
| Open NK natural ice | 1 | 0 | 0 |
| KNSB Cup standing | 1 | 0 | 0 |
| Natural ice classics | 0 | 1 | 2 |
| Alternative Elfstedentocht | 1 | 1 | 2 |
| Competitions on artificial ice | 29 | 14 | 13 |

- Profile of Lammert Huitema at Schaatspeloton.nl
