= Bennie van der Weide =

Dutch former speed skater (born 1947)

Personal information
- Born: 18 July 1947 (age 79) Bolsward, Friesland, Netherlands
- Years active: 1970–1989

Sport
- Sport: Marathon speed skating
- Events: Long distances and marathons

Bennie van der Weide (born 18 July 1947) is a Dutch former marathon speed skater. He won the inaugural edition of the Royal Dutch Skating Federation (Koninklijke Nederlandsche Schaatsenrijders Bond; KNSB) Cup in 1973. Furthermore, he won silver in the Oldambtrit, a classic natural-ice race, in 1980 and completed the Elfstedentocht twice.

== Career ==
=== Early years ===
Van der Weide was fifteen at the time of the 1963 Elfstedentocht and still too young to participate. From then on, he became passionate about speed skating and joined the training group in his hometown of Bolsward. Van der Weide, a carpenter by trade, moved to Heerenveen in 1969. He won his first race on 9 January 1970: the Zuidwesthoekrit, an 80-kilometre race on natural ice. Several victories followed, such as the marathon at the De Meent outdoor ice rink in Alkmaar on 3 December 1972.

=== KNSB Cup ===
On 14 March 1973, at the Jaap Eden Rink in Amsterdam, van der Weide became the first winner of the KNSB Cup, which was sponsored as the "Heineken Trophy." He won three of the nine races. He finished fourth on the last day, but his lead was substantial enough that his overall victory was never in jeopardy. A year later, at the second edition, Van der Weide finished third in the final standings, and the victory went to Henk Portengen. By 1975, he was no longer contending for the top positions and finished seventh.

=== Alternative Elfstedentocht ===
Owing to the mild winters with little ice suitable for skating in the Netherlands during the 1970s, marathon speed skaters turned to venues abroad. The first Alternative Elfstedentocht was held in Lillehammer, Norway, on 2 March 1974. Van der Weide finished fourteenth in the race, which was won by Jan Roelof Kruithof. The Alternative Elfstedentocht was held on 31 January 1976, in Lahti, Finland. Van der Weide finished seventh, with the same time as the winner, Kruithof.

After an eleventh-place finish on 5 March 1977, in Oulu, Finland, the race in Lahti on 4 March 1978, had to be shortened from 200 to 100 kilometres owing to a thaw. Jaap Jonkman won the race, while Van der Weide finished fourth. After crossing the finish line, he skated an additional 50-kilometre lap on his own to demonstrate that it was perfectly feasible. Two years later, on 23 February 1980, Van der Weide finished fourth again, this time in a full-distance race in Oulu. In 1981, in Lahti, he was forced to withdraw early owing to a broken skate; the severe frost caused cracks to form in the ice, leading to equipment failures for the skaters. The 1983 Alternative Elfstedentocht took place in the United States. Jan Roelof Kruithof proved the strongest on Lake Memphremagog, on the border with Canada. Van der Weide finished fifth.

=== Marathon ===
Van der Weide won the silver medal at the 1976 Dutch Marathon Skating Championships on artificial ice on 17 January 1976. At the Eindhoven ice rink, victory went to Wout List, who beat Van der Weide and Henk Portengen by a narrow margin in the sprint. He achieved his last great national marathon victory on Boxing Day 1976, when he won the "Martini Cup" at the Kardinge ice rink in Groningen. Van der Weide claimed the Frisian title on the frozen ice at Makkum on 9 February 1979. He also won the first natural-ice marathon in Gorredijk, Friesland, on 17 January 1982.

=== KNSB suspension ===
Van der Weide missed the marathon for the KNSB Cup on the Jaap Edenbaan in Amsterdam that weekend of 16 and 17 January 1982 because he preferred two trips on natural ice. On Saturday the Rottemerentocht in Zevenhuizen, he finished sixth, and on Sunday he won the marathon in Gorredijk. The KNSB did not accept this and imposed a two-race suspension on him and several other skaters. Van der Weide ignored the suspension and simply showed up at the start of the marathon in Deventer on 23 January, an event that counted towards the KNSB Cup. He finished in fourth place as an unregistered competitor and was disqualified from the results. Following an emergency meeting, the KNSB's appeals committee decided a few days later to provisionally lift the suspension. Ultimately, all the suspended marathon skaters were exonerated in late March 1982.

=== Elfstedentocht ===
Three days before Van der Weide's first Elfstedentocht, he beat Evert van Benthem on 17 February 1985 in the sprint of the marathon in Gorredijk. Competing as a 37-year-old debutant, he finished in 36th place on 20 February, more than 19 minutes behind winner Van Benthem. For several weeks leading up to his second Elfstedentocht, held on 26 February 1986, marathon races on natural ice were being held in the Netherlands. Van der Weide won the race in Franeker on 9 February. He finished the Elfstedentocht in 92nd place, putting him in the middle of the pack among the competitive skaters. He participated in the 1997 Elfstedentocht as a recreational skater. Not only did he complete the tour on ice skates, but in later years, he also covered the 200-kilometre Elfsteden route by bicycle, kick scooter, and inline skates, as well as on foot and by canoe.

=== Inline skating ===
In the mid-1980s, Van der Weide began inline skating during the summer months. He did not do it just to keep up his fitness; he also took part in competitions. At the first Dutch championship, on 14 September 1985 in Hattem, he finished second behind winner Dries van Wijhe. In 1986, an Elfsteden competition was organized in Friesland. Jan Eise Kromkamp won the overall standings after eleven races, finishing ahead of runner-up Van der Weide. A year later, he initiated the first 200-kilometre inline skating race to follow the route of the Elfstedentocht. Dries van Wijhe won, ahead of Van der Weide, who finished second.

=== Retirement ===
Halfway through the 1988/1989 speed skating season, Van der Weide decided to retire from competitive racing in the A-division. The 41-year-old Van der Weide skated his last marathon on 14 January 1989, in Assen. He had increasingly been forced to drop out of races early. "It’s all getting a bit too much for me. When you can no longer finish in the rankings, the fun starts to fade," he explained in the Leeuwarder Courant.

He moved up to the veterans (the "masters") category, where he would go on to race marathons for another nine years.

After his sports career and his retirement as a sports hall manager, he became a nature photographer and also exhibited his work.

== Records ==
=== Personal bests ===
| Distance | Time | Date | Track |
|---|---|---|---|
| 500 m | 42.50 | 19 February 1973 | (Netherlands) Heerenveen |
| 1000 m | 1:28.60 | 5 February 1974 | (Netherlands) Heerenveen |
| 1500 m | 2:13.30 | 20 February 1973 | (Netherlands) Heerenveen |
| 3000 m | 4:40.51 | 14 January 1978 | (Switzerland) Davos |
| 5000 m | 8:08.90 | 19 February 1973 | (Netherlands) Heerenveen |
| 10 000 m | 15:41.60 | 2 March 1987 | (Netherlands) Heerenveen |

== Marathon speed skating results ==
=== Results in major competitions ===
| Year | NK artificial ice | NK natural ice | Jaap Eden Trophy | KNSB Cup standing | Heineken Zesdaagse | Alternative Elfstedentocht | Elfstedentocht |
|---|---|---|---|---|---|---|---|
| 1971 | | | 5e | | | 13e | |
| 1972 | | | 8th | | | 19th | |
| 1973 | 10th | | 6th | 1st place, gold medalist(s) | | | |
| 1974 | withdrew | | | 3rd place, bronze medalist(s) | | 14th | |
| 1975 | 9th | | 3th | 7th | | | |
| 1976 | 2nd place, silver medalist(s) | | | 11th | | 7th | |
| 1977 | 11th | | 9th | 6th | | 11th | |
| 1978 | | | | | | 4th | |
| 1979 | 6th | withdrew | | | | | |
| 1980 | | | | 11th | | 4th | |
| 1981 | withdrew | | 6th | 9th | | withdrew | |
| 1982 | 4th | | | 13th | | | |
| 1983 | 10th | | | 16th | | 5th | |
| 1984 | | | | | 7th | 17th | |
| 1985 | | | 16th | 20th | 25th | | 36th |
| 1986 | 20th | withdrew | | 12th | | | 92nd |
| 1987 | 6th | withdrew | 15th | | | 24th | |
| 1988 | | | | | | 55th | |
| 1989 | | | | | | | |
| 1990 | | | | | | 31st | |
| 1993 | | | | | | 17th | |

=== Results in natural-ice classics ===
| Year | De 100 van Eernewoude | Amstelmeer Marathon | Ronde van Loosdrecht | Driedaagse van Ankeveen | Noordwest- hoekrit | Oldambt- rit | Hollands Venetiëtocht | Rottemeren- tocht | Veluwemeer- tocht |
|---|---|---|---|---|---|---|---|---|---|
| 1970 | | | 12th | | | | | | |
| 1971 | | | 13th | | | | | | |
| 1978 | | | | | | 6th | | | |
| 1979 | 7th | 7th | | 9th | | | | 6th | 35th |
| 1980 | 19th | | | | | 2nd place, silver medalist(s) | | | |
| 1982 | | | | | | | | 6th | |
| 1985 | | | | | 8th | | 14th | | |
| 1986 | | | | 33rd | | | | | |

=== Medal table ===
| Championship | Gold | Silver | Bronze |
|---|---|---|---|
| NK artificial ice | 0 | 1 | 0 |
| KNSB Cup standing | 1 | 0 | 0 |
| Natural ice classics | 0 | 1 | 0 |
| Competitions on artificial ice | 9 | 15 | 11 |

Sources:

- Profile of Bennie van der Weide at Schaatspeloton.nl
- Profile of Bennie van der Weide at Marathonschaatsenutrecht.nl
