= Oosterwolde =

Oosterwolde may refer to:

- Oosterwolde, Friesland, a village in the municipality of Ooststellingwerf in the Dutch province of Friesland
- Oosterwolde, Gelderland, a village in the municipality of Oldebroek in the Dutch province of Gelderland
- Jayden Oosterwolde (born 2001), Dutch footballer
