= Sjoerd Huisman =

Dutch speed skater (1986–2013)

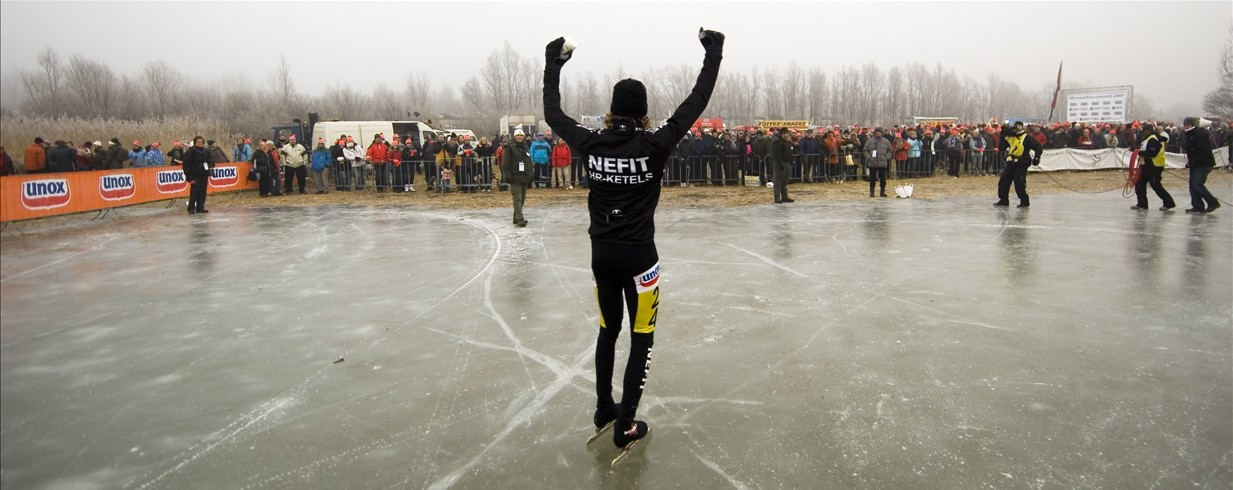
- Sjoerd Huisman Champion 2009

Personal information
- Born: 19 June 1986 Andijk, Netherlands
- Died: 30 December 2013 (aged 27) Avenhorn, Netherlands

Sport
- Country: Netherlands
- Sport: Speed skating
Medal record
Men's speed skating
Representing the Netherlands
Dutch Marathon Championships
Gold medal – first place	2009	Natural ice

Sjoerd Huisman (19 June 1986 – 30 December 2013) was a Dutch speed skater who specialised in marathon speed skating.

== Career ==
Huisman made his debut in marathon speed skating in 2005 to become one of the best sprinters in the peloton. His biggest success was winning the Dutch championship on natural ice in 2009 at the Oostvaardersplassen. A year later Huisman won the Essent Cup and the Dutch Open at the Austrian Weissensee.

Huisman was also successful in inline skating. In 2010 he won the Dutch marathon championship.

In May 2011, Huisman was involved in a car accident after he blacked-out behind the wheel. Seven months later he returned to the peloton.

== Honours ==
- Dutch national marathon speed skating champion: 1 time
- Dutch national marathon inlineskating champion: 1 time

=== Personal longtrack records ===
Personal records
Men's Speed skating
Event	Result	Date	Location	Notes
500 m	37.59	30 November 2008	Hoorn	
1000 m	1:14.78	4 October 2009	Heerenveen	
1500 m	1:53.69	25 November 2008	Heerenveen	
3000 m	4:10.80	12 November 2004	Heerenveen	
5000 m	7:44.06	15 February 2004	Utrecht	

== Personal life and death ==
His sister, Mariska Huisman, is one of the Netherlands' most successful female marathon speed skaters.

On 30 December 2013, Huisman died of cardiac arrest, aged only 27. He had finished only second to Arjan Stroetinga in one of his final races, on 22 December 2013.
