= Noordeinde, Gelderland =

Noordeinde
- Village
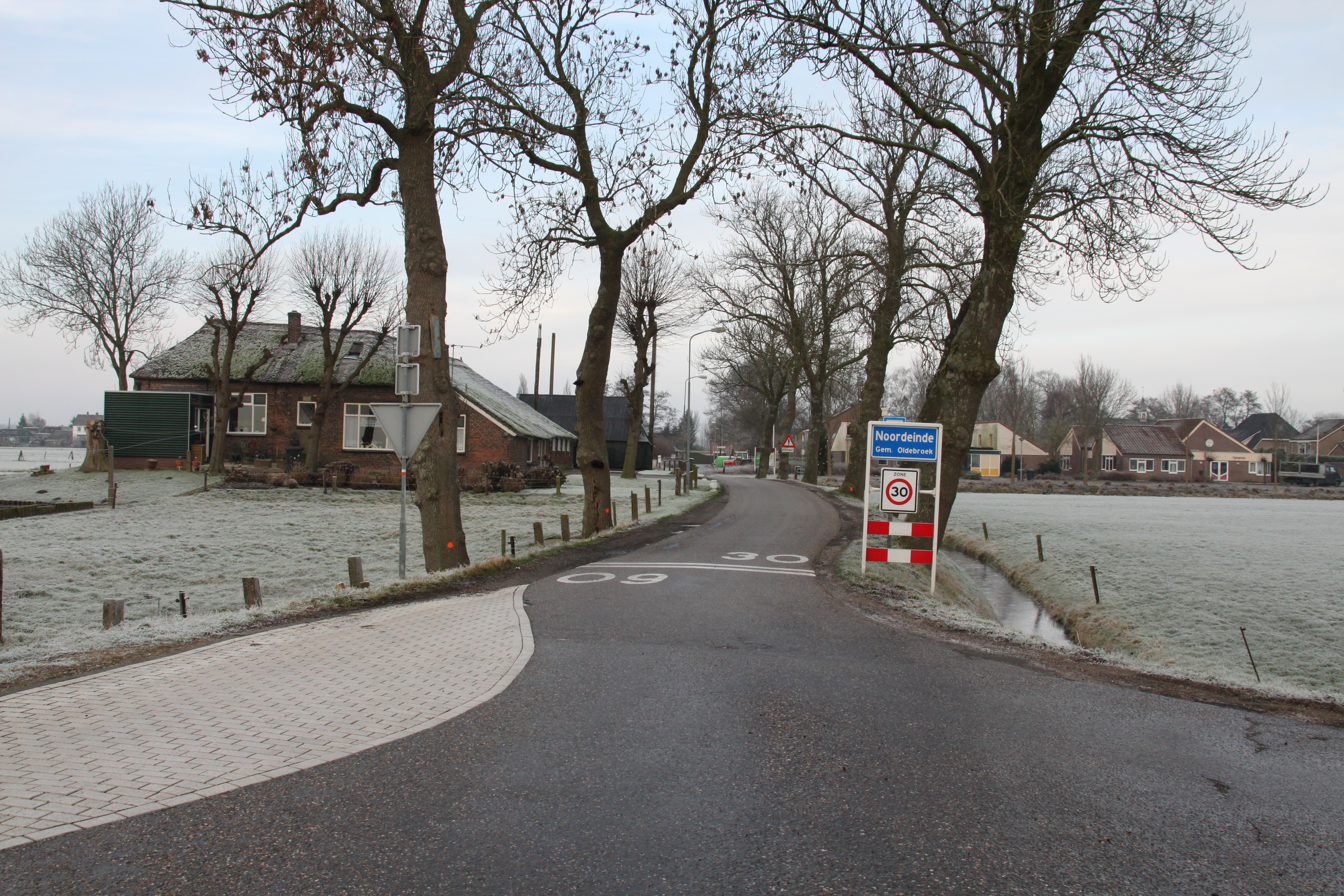
- Entrance to Noordeinde

- Location of Noordeinde in the province of Gelderland Noordeinde (Netherlands)
- Coordinates: 52.5128°N 5.8772°E
- Country: Netherlands
- Province: Gelderland
- Municipality: Oldebroek

Area
  - Total: 0.39 km^{2} (0.15 sq mi)
- Elevation: 1 m (3.3 ft)

Population (2021)
  - Total: 205
  - Density: 530/km^{2} (1,400/sq mi)
- Time zone: UTC+1 (CET)
  - Summer (DST): UTC+2 (CEST)
- Postal code: 8079
- Dialing code: 0525

Noordeinde is a village in the municipality of Oldebroek in the province of Gelderland, the Netherlands. Noordeinde has 215 inhabitants (2000).

It was first described between 1830 as 1855 Kamper Nieuwstad. In 1970, it was renamed Noordeinde (North end), because it was at the northern part of the municipality. In 1840, it was home to 155 people. In 1845, a church was built.

== Gallery ==
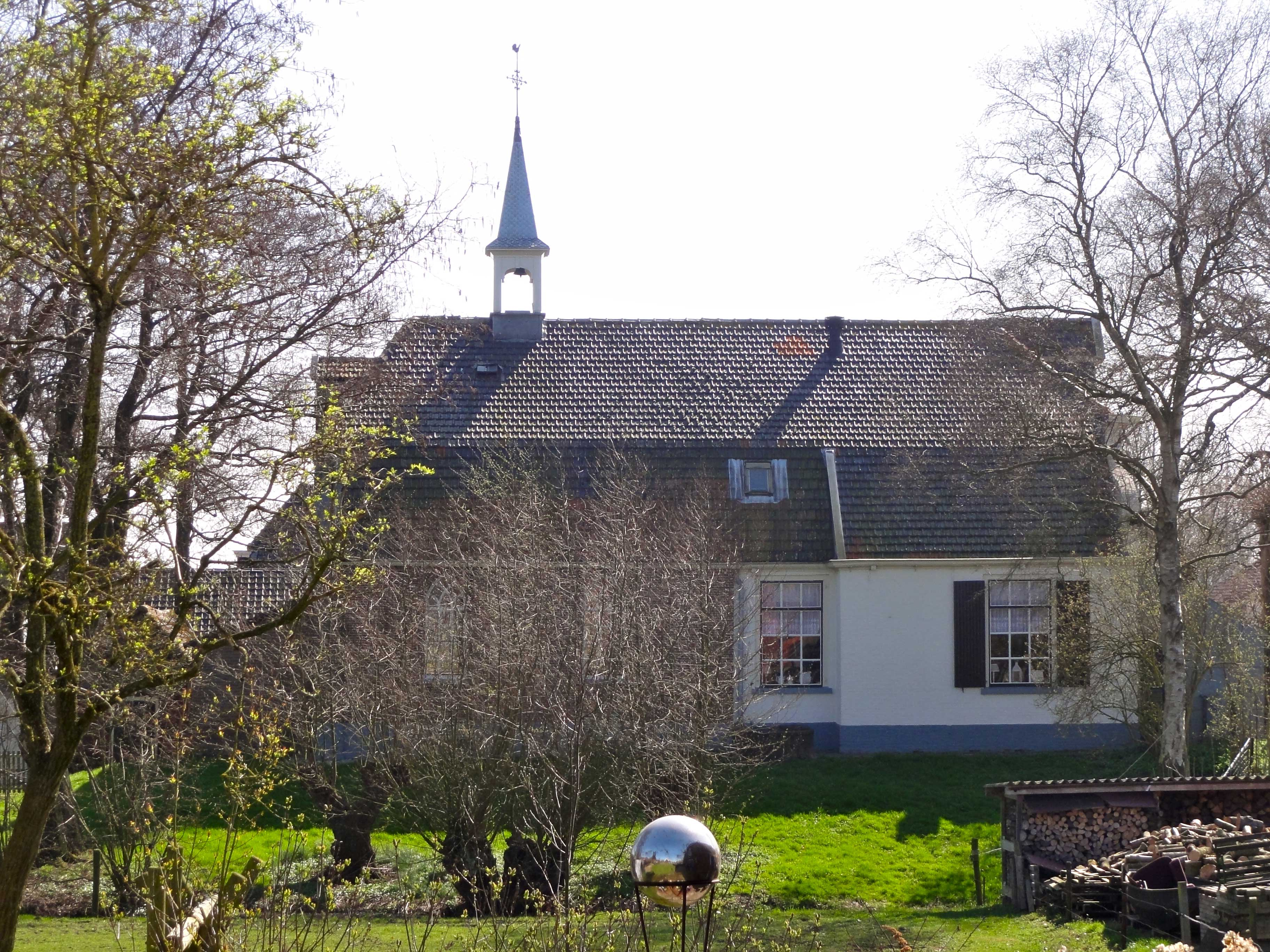
Church of Noordeinde

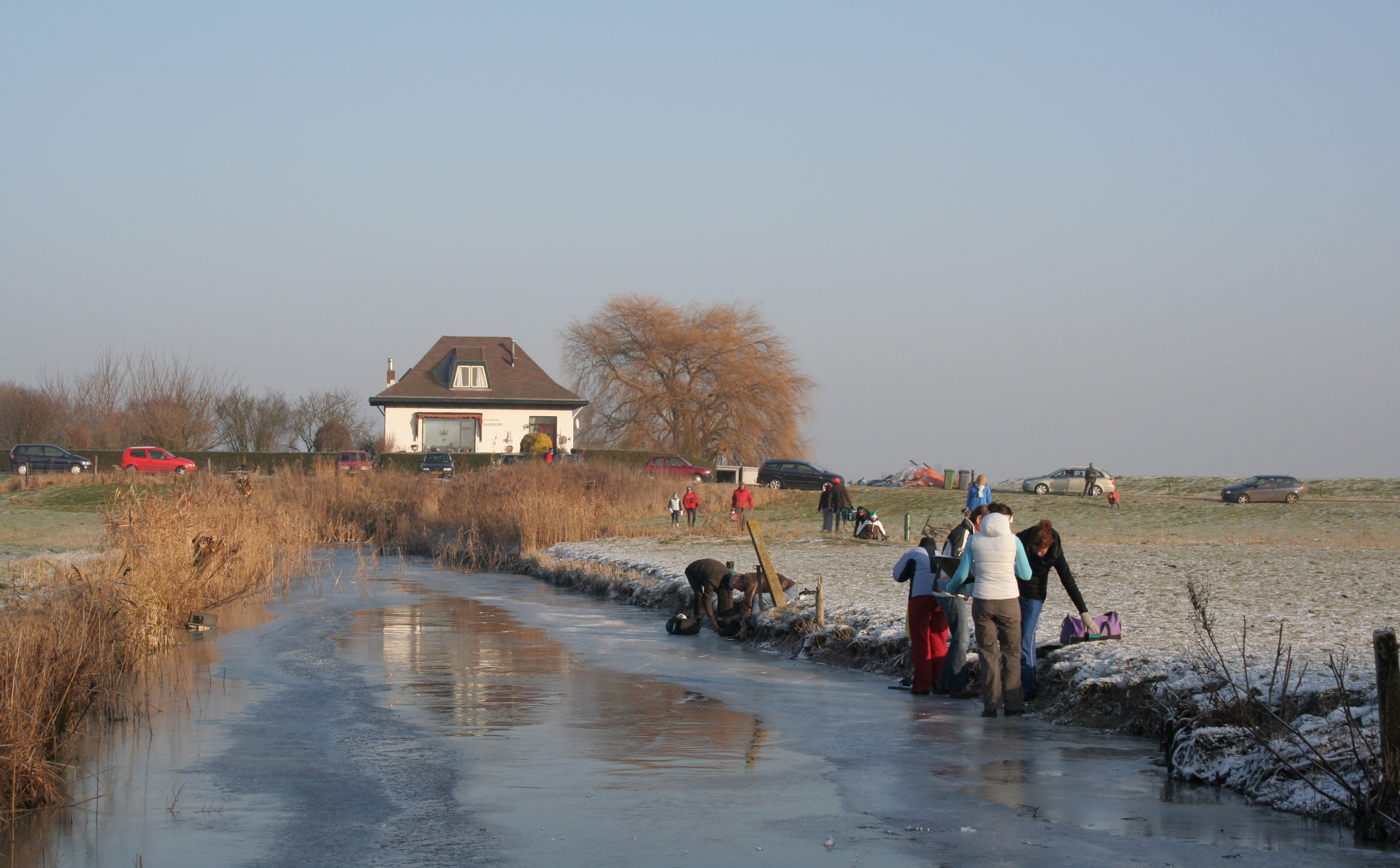
The former pumping station with skaters
