= Dries van Wijhe =

Dutch former speed skater (born 1945)

- Dries van Wijhe (1986)

Personal information
- Nicknames: "Dolle Dries" "De Keizer van het Kerkdorp" "De Boemerang" "Opa"
- Born: 20 December 1945 (age 80) Oosterwolde, Gelderland, Netherlands

Sport
- Sport: Marathon speed skating
- Events: Long distances Marathons

Dries van Wijhe (born 20 December 1945), nicknamed "Dolle Dries" (Crazy Dries), "De Keizer van het Kerkdorp" (The Emperor of the Village), or "De Boemerang" (The Boomerang), is a Dutch former marathon speed skater and cyclist. During his last years competing in A-division speed skating, the nickname "Opa" (Grandpa) was bestowed upon him.

== Biography ==
Van Wijhe was twice the Dutch champion in marathon speed skating on natural ice: in 1986 in Giethoorn and in 1991 in Ankeveen. He also finished second in 1979 in Loosdrecht, in that championship's first year, and in 1987 in Eernewoude.

As well as being a marathon speed skater, van Wijhe was a successful cyclist. His most notable achievement was winning the Dutch Amateur Championship in 1973 (in the province of Limburg). Van Wijhe was joined on the podium by Fedor den Hertog and Gerrie Knetemann. The story of how Van Wijhe suffered a flat tyre while in a winning position has become legendary; he hopped onto a women's bicycle and was the first to cross the finish line. To this day, it remains unclear whether "Dolle Dries" actually was struck by a flat tyre. He was, after all, one of the first to combine athletic performance with showmanship.

Van Wijhe won the A-category marathon skating race at the Thialf rink in Heerenveen fourteen times.

He also won the Alternative Elfstedentocht at Weißensee, Austria in 1989.

Later, van Wijhe competed in the National Marathon Skating Championships on natural ice for veterans, where he achieved a second-place finish (1993, Maasland) and a third-place finish (1994, Giethoorn).

== Marathon speed skating results ==
=== Results in major competitions ===
Year	NK artificial ice	NK natural ice	Jaap Eden Trophy	KNSB Cup standing	Heineken Zesdaagse	Alternative Elfstedentocht	Elfstedentocht
1974	withdrew			5th		withdrew	
1975							
1976	withdrew			5th			
1977	4th			9th			
1978	5th		2nd place, silver medalist(s)	8th			
1979	withdrew	2nd place, silver medalist(s)	1st place, gold medalist(s)	12th			
1980	2nd place, silver medalist(s)		9th	6th			
1981	14th			6th			
1982	2nd place, silver medalist(s)		1st place, gold medalist(s)	5th			
1983	7th		3rd place, bronze medalist(s)	9th	12th		
1984	13th			12th			
1985		withdrew		14th			10th
1986		1st place, gold medalist(s)		24th			withdrew
1987	7th	2nd place, silver medalist(s)		5th			
1988				9th			
1989	1st place, gold medalist(s)					1st place, gold medalist(s)	
1990							
1991		1st place, gold medalist(s)					

=== Results in natural-ice classics ===
Year	De 100 van Eernewoude	Ronde van Loosdrecht	Westland Marathon	Driedaagse van Ankeveen	Rottemeren- tocht	Veluwemeer- tocht
1970						2nd place, silver medalist(s)
1976						1st place, gold medalist(s)
1979		2nd place, silver medalist(s)		1st place, gold medalist(s)	1st place, gold medalist(s)	1st place, gold medalist(s)
1980	1st place, gold medalist(s)					
1987			4th	3rd place, bronze medalist(s)		

== Personal life ==
Van Wijhe, who is Christian, did not participate in competitions held on Sundays or other Christian holidays on religious principle. For the 2006 municipal elections, he served on the recommendation committee for the local branch of the political party ChristenUnie in Oldebroek.

Van Wijhe lives in the village of Kerkdorp near Oosterwolde in northern Gelderland, which is part of the municipality of Oldebroek.

== Gallery ==
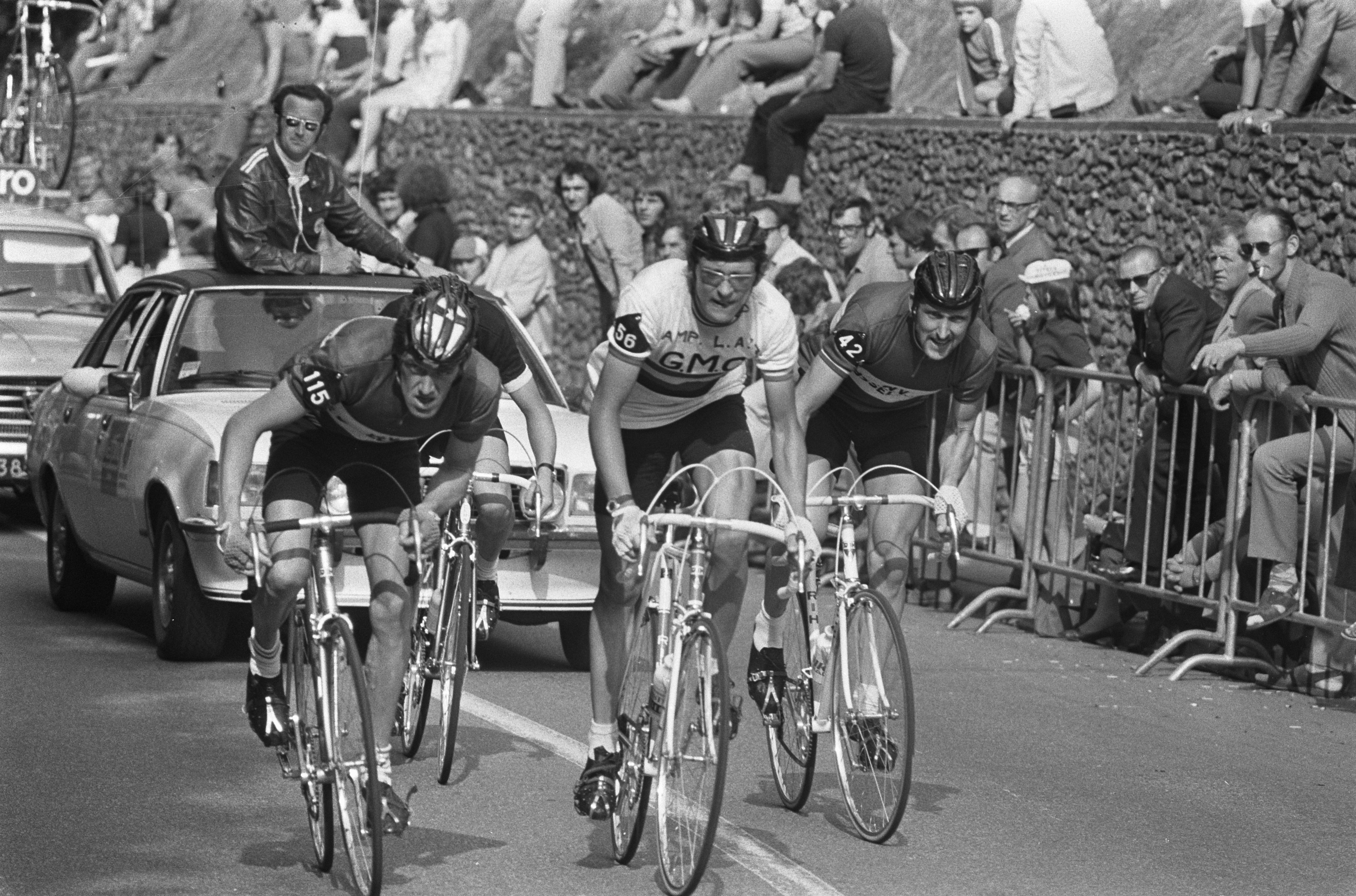
1973: Leading group at the National Amateur Championships, featuring Van Wĳhe, Knetemann, and Fedor den Hertog.

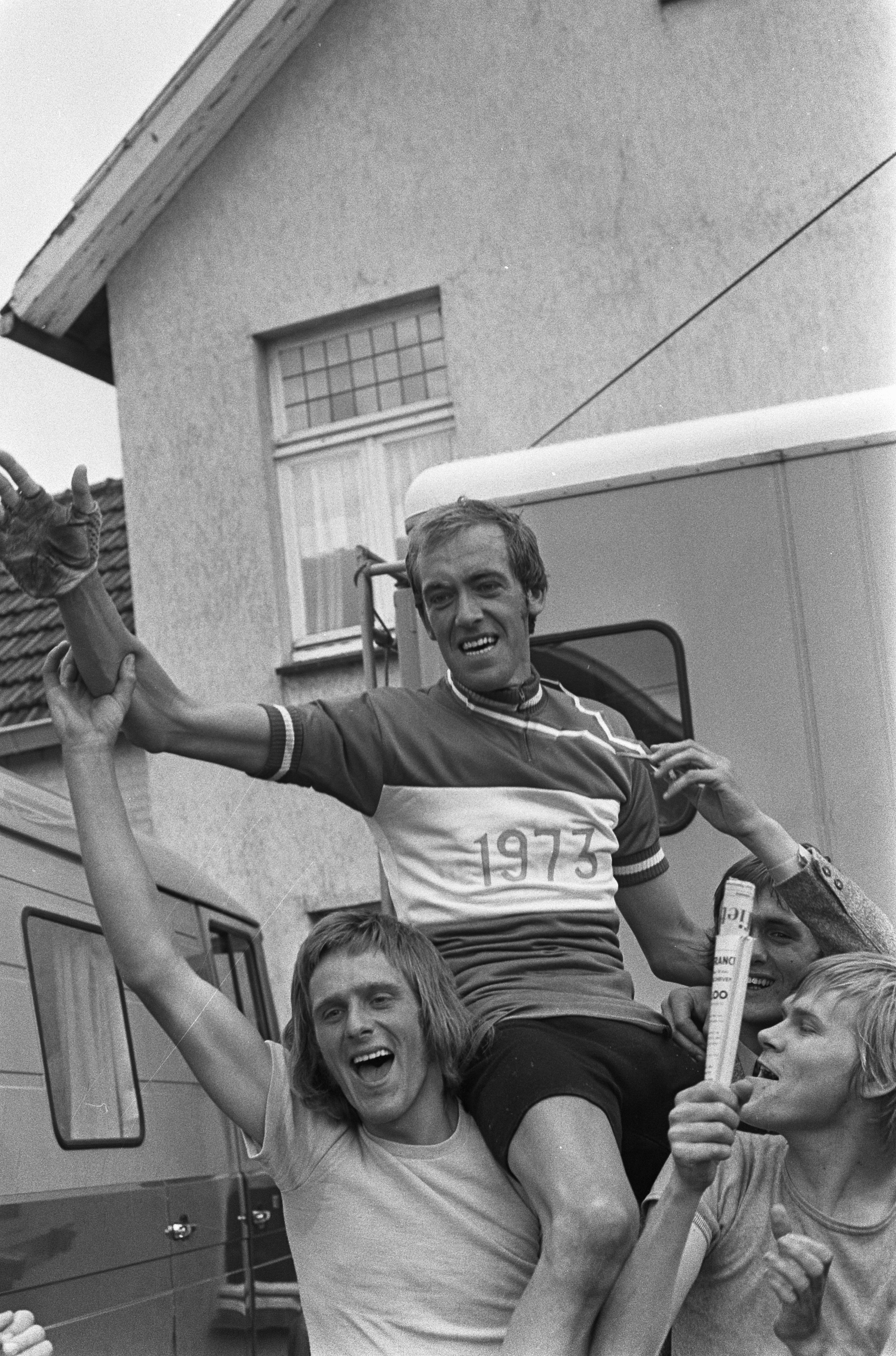
Celebration after the National Championship win

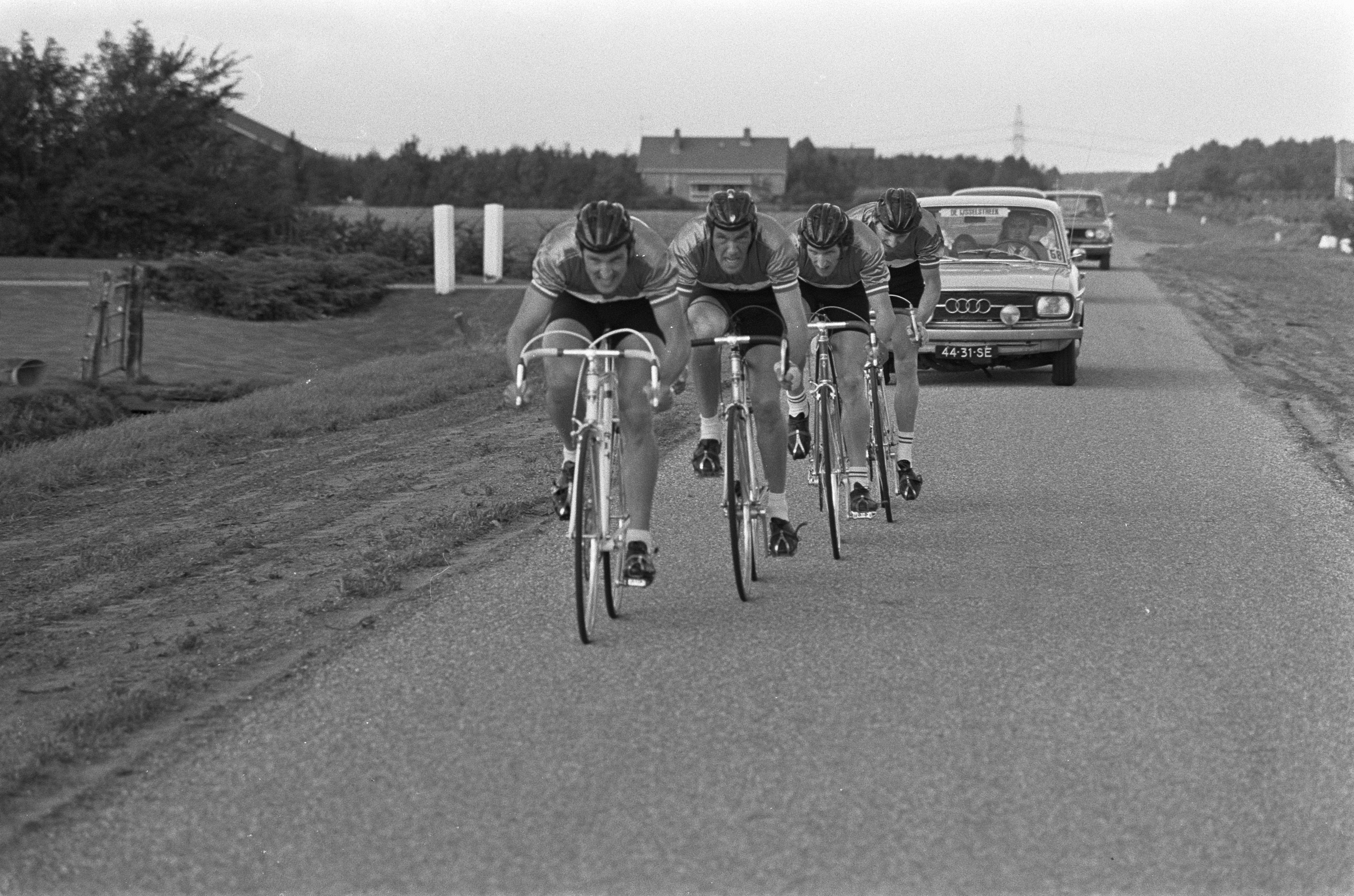
1973: Ĳsselstreek wins the National Club Championship with Fedor den Hertog; behind him are Dries van Wijhe, Nidi den Hertog, and D. Schuurman.

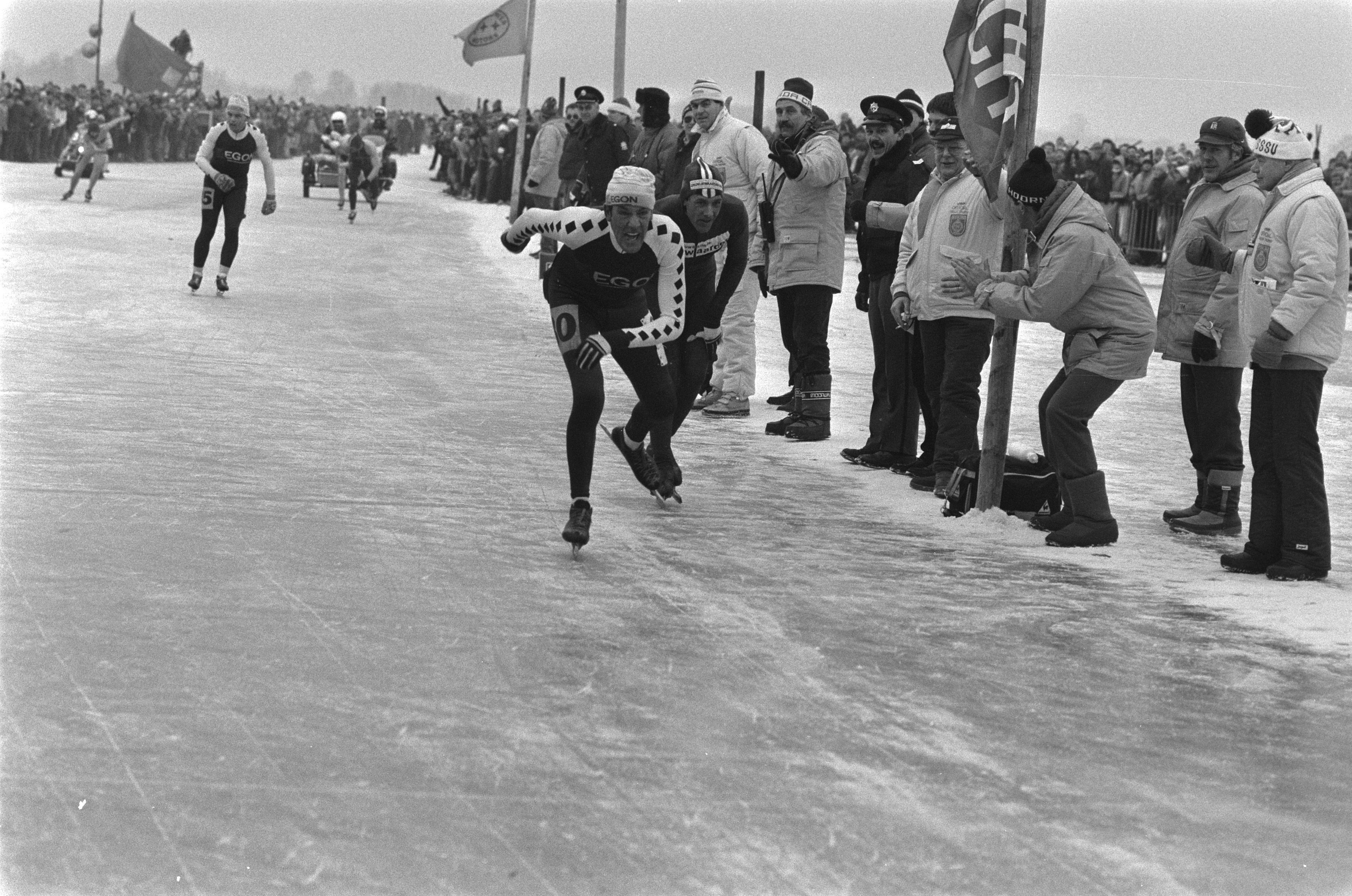
1986: Victory at the National Marathon Championship on natural ice

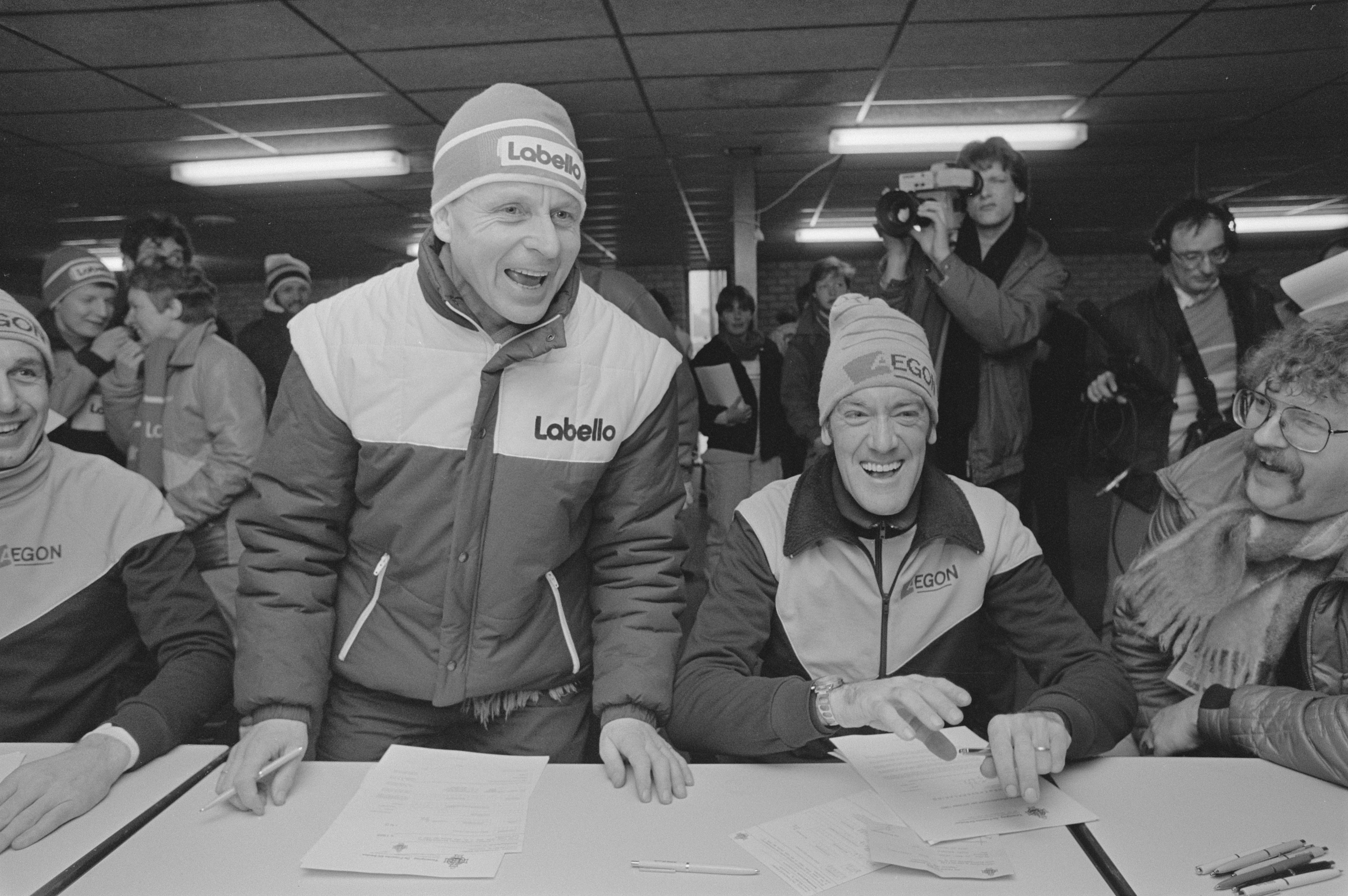
1986: Kruithof and van Wĳhe register for the Elfstedentocht race.

Sources:

- Profile of Dries van Wijhe at Schaatspeloton.nl
- Profile of Dries van Wijhe at Marathonschaatsenutrecht.nl
