= Oldebroek =

- Municipality
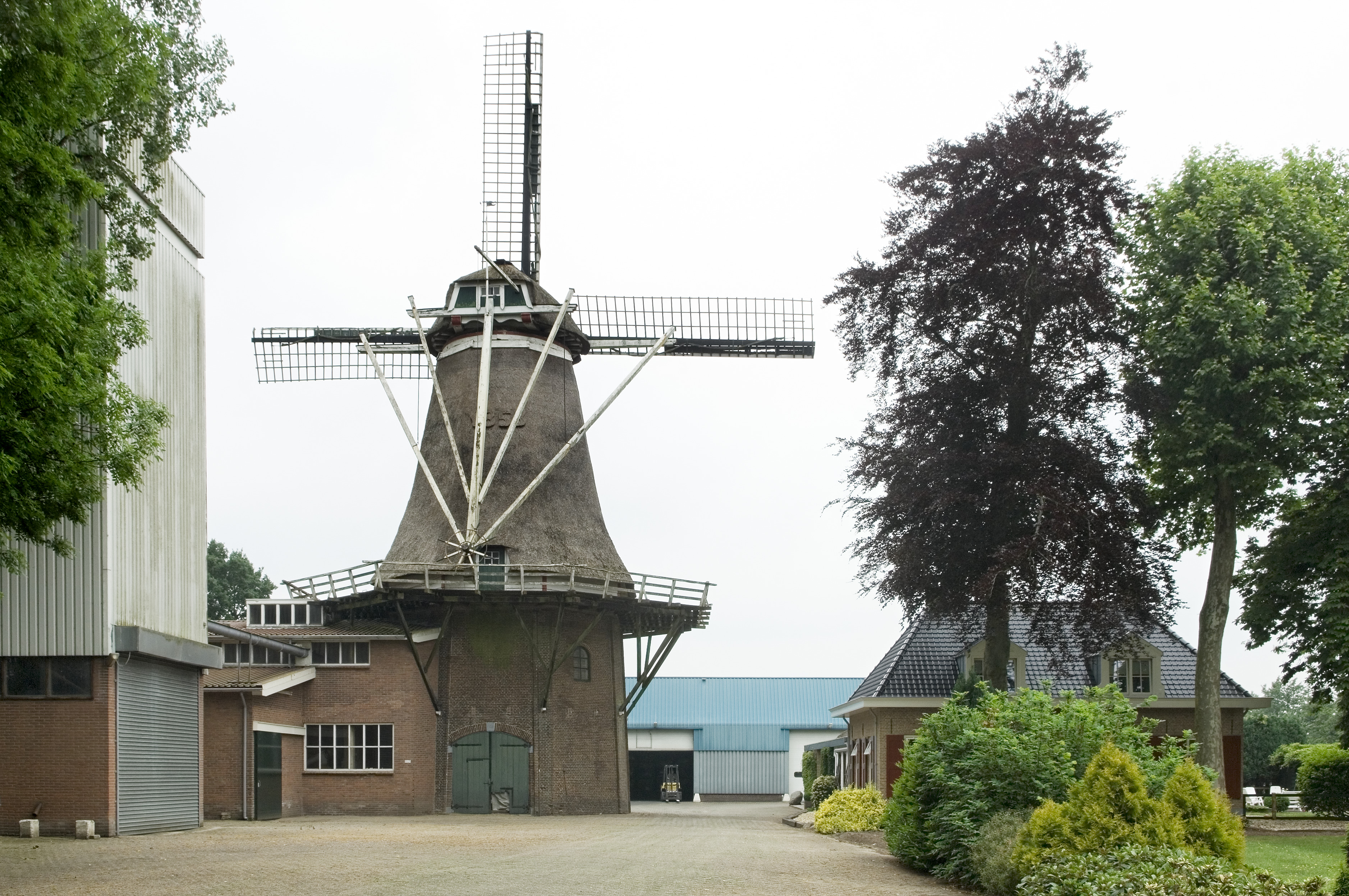
- Windmill in Oldebroek

- Flag Coat of arms

- Location in Gelderland
- Coordinates: 52°27′N 5°54′E
- Country: Netherlands
- Province: Gelderland

Government
  - Body: Municipal council
  - Mayor: Adriaan Hoogendoorn (CU)

Area
  - Total: 98.84 km^{2} (38.16 sq mi)
  - Land: 97.65 km^{2} (37.70 sq mi)
  - Water: 1.19 km^{2} (0.46 sq mi)
- Elevation: 2 m (6.6 ft)

Population (January 2021)
  - Total: 23,760
  - Density: 243/km^{2} (630/sq mi)
- Demonym: Oldebroeker
- Time zone: UTC+1 (CET)
  - Summer (DST): UTC+2 (CEST)
- Postcode: 8079, 8090–8097
- Area code: 038, 0525
- Website: www.oldebroek.nl

Oldebroek (Dutch pronunciation: [ˌɔldəˈbruk]) is a municipality and a town in the province of Gelderland. The municipality had a population of 23,760 in 2021.

== Population centres ==
- Bovenveen
- Eekt
- Hattemerbroek
- Kerkdorp
- 't Loo
- Mullegen
- Noordeinde
- Oldebroek
- Oosterwolde
- Posthoorn
- Voskuil
- Wezep

=== Topography ===
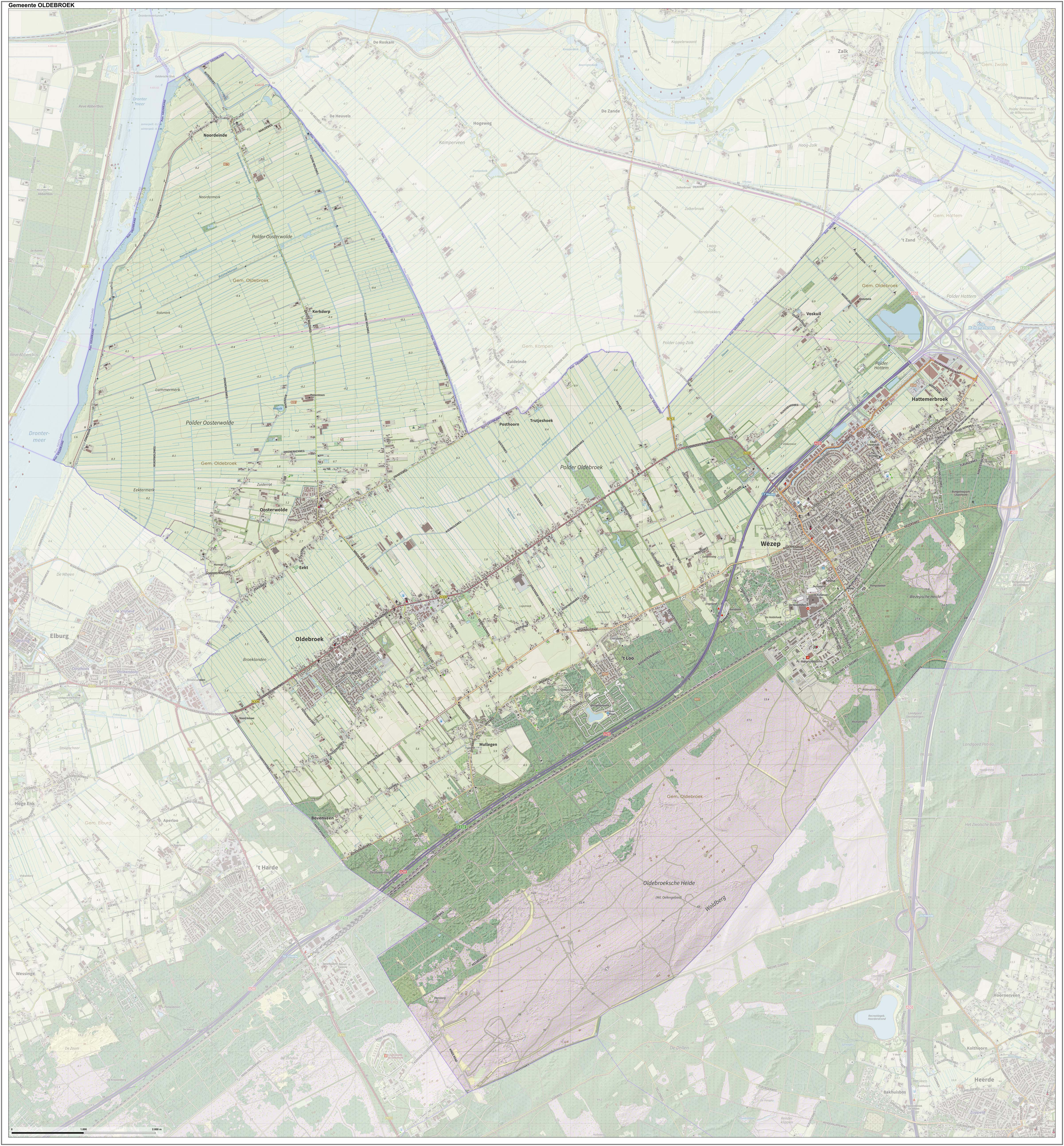

Dutch Topographic map of the municipality of Oldebroek, June 2015

== Sport ==
Oldebroek has been host to the Dutch Sidecarcross Grand Prix a number times

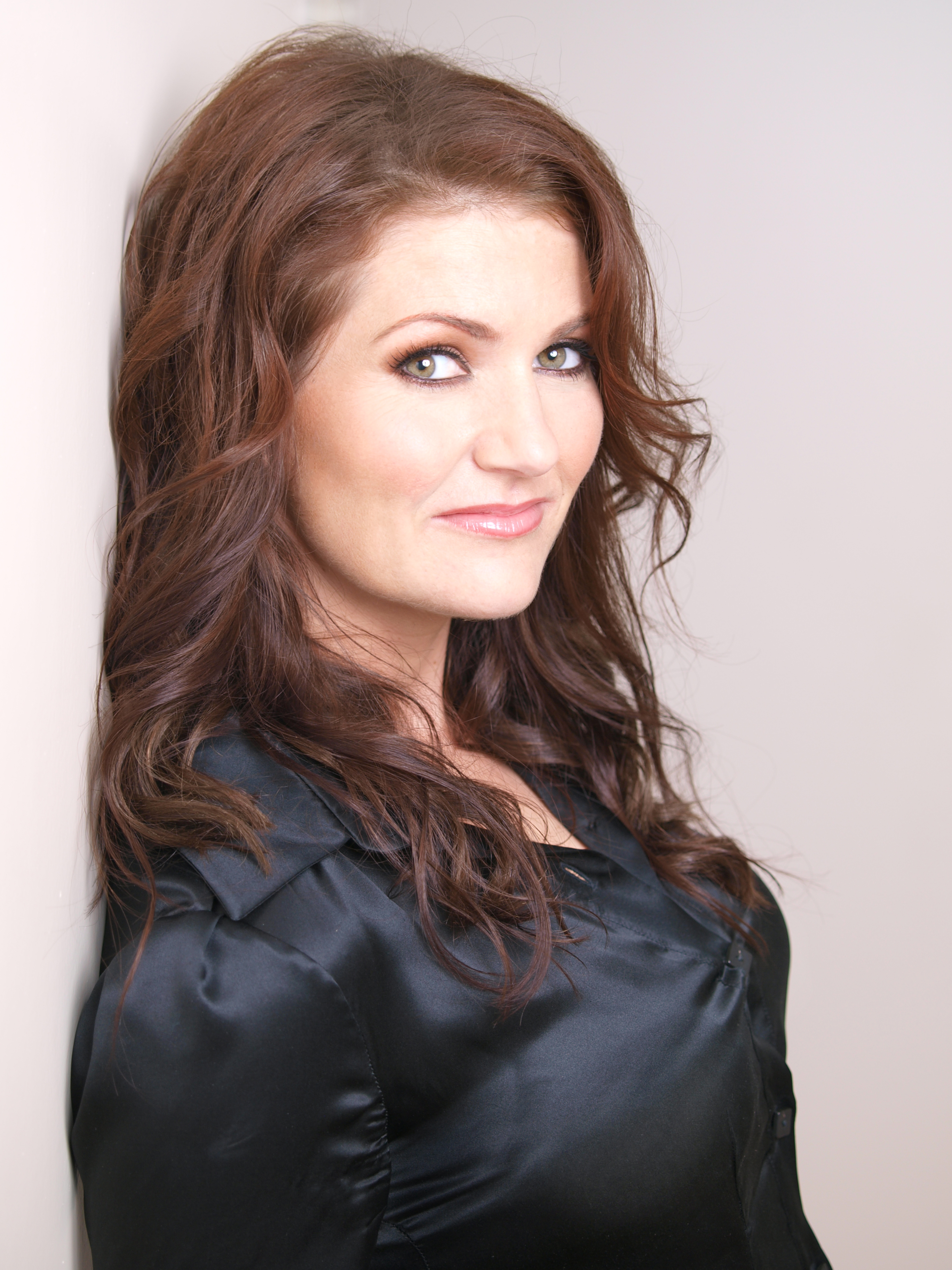
Lana Wolf, 2012

== Notable people ==
- Rudolph van Pallandt (1868–1913), sport shooter who competed at the 1908 Summer Olympics
- Martin Koopman (born 1956 in Wezep), former football defender and football manager
- Jan Maarten Heideman (born 1973), speed skater
- Henri Ruitenberg (born 1957), speed skater
- Lana Wolf (born 1975 in Wezep), pop singer
- Freek Jansen (born 1992), politician

== Gallery ==
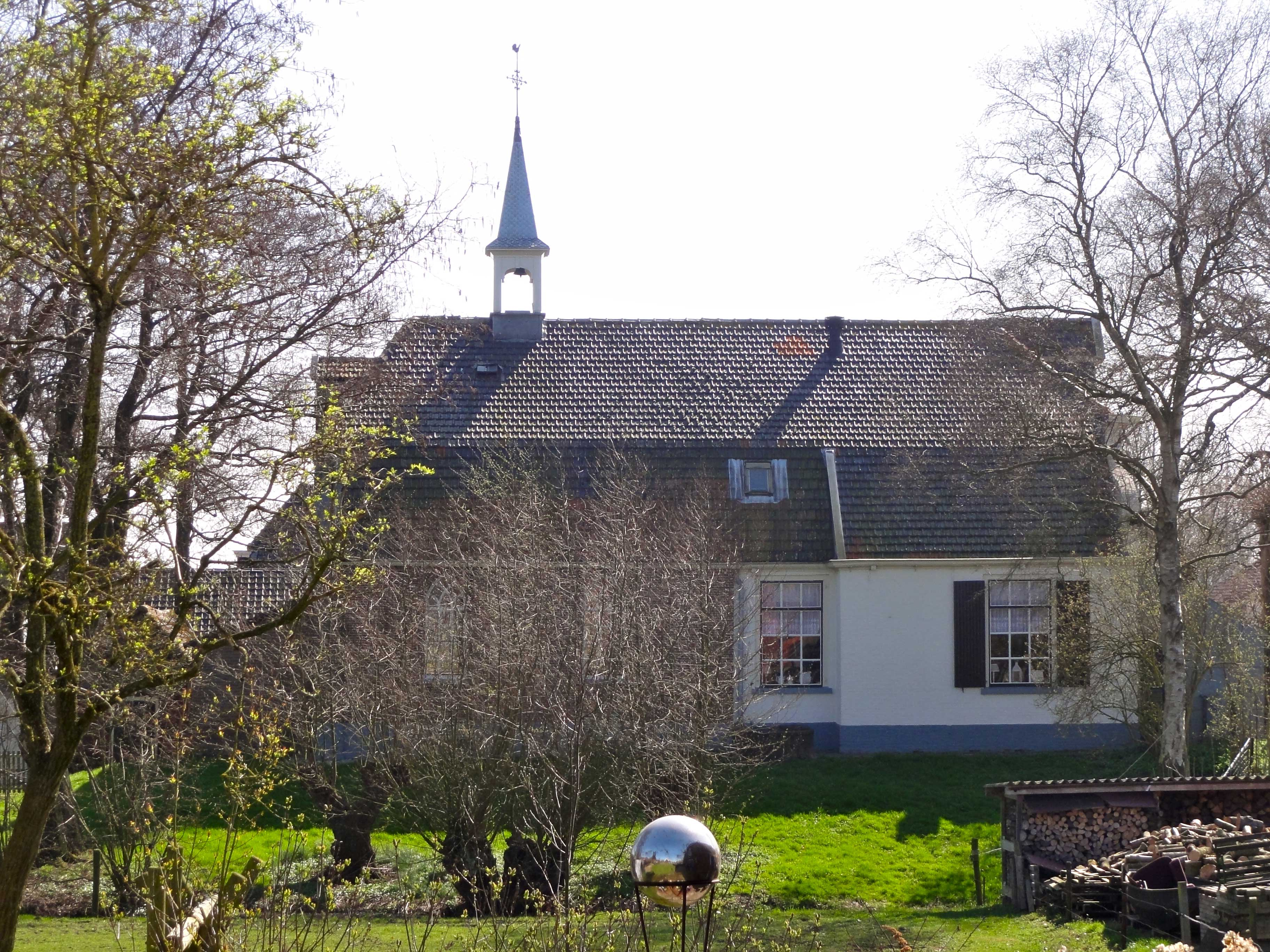
Kerkje van Noordeinde

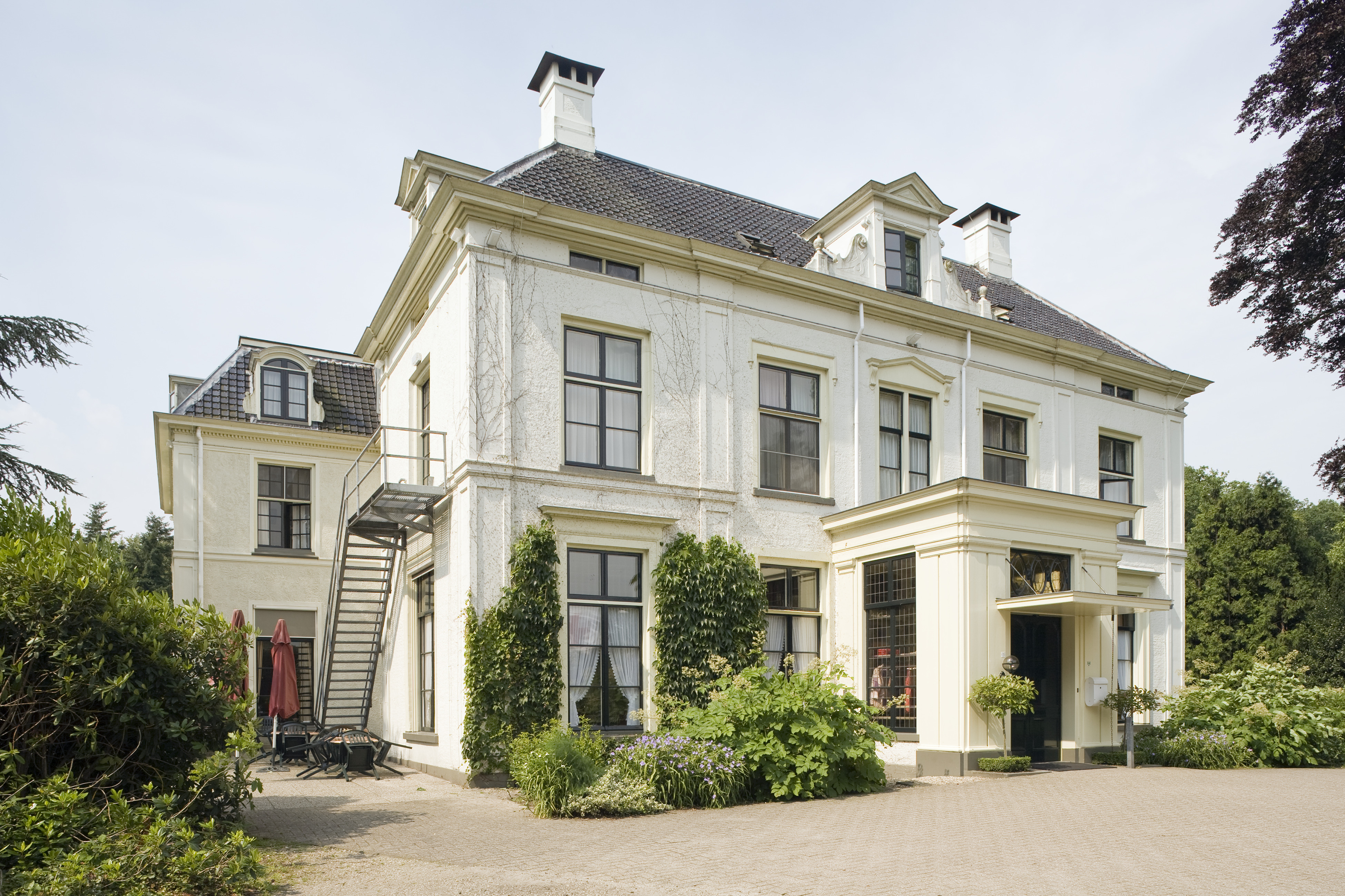
Overzicht van de voorgevel van het landhuis met portiek - Wezep

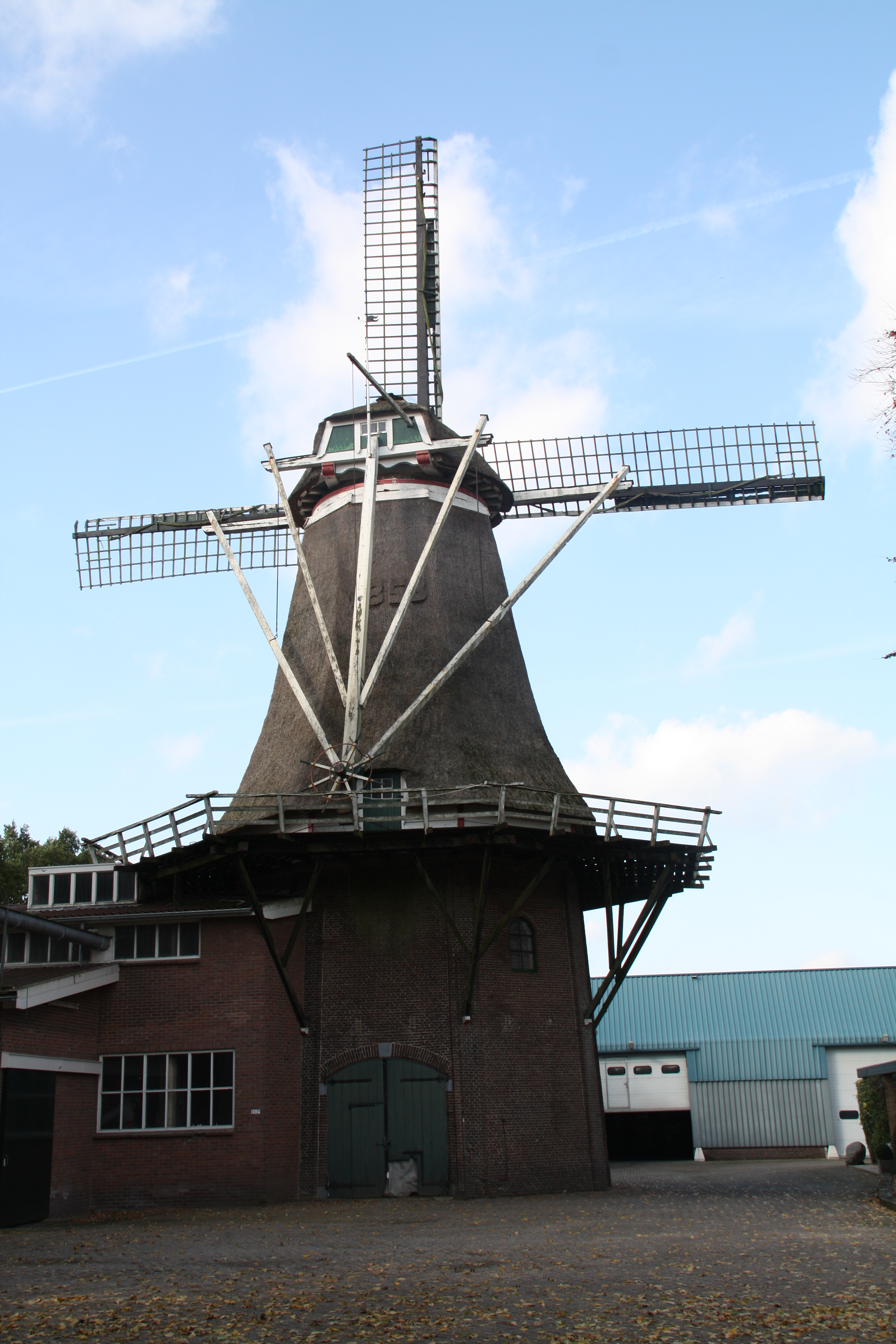
Oldebroek - De Hoop

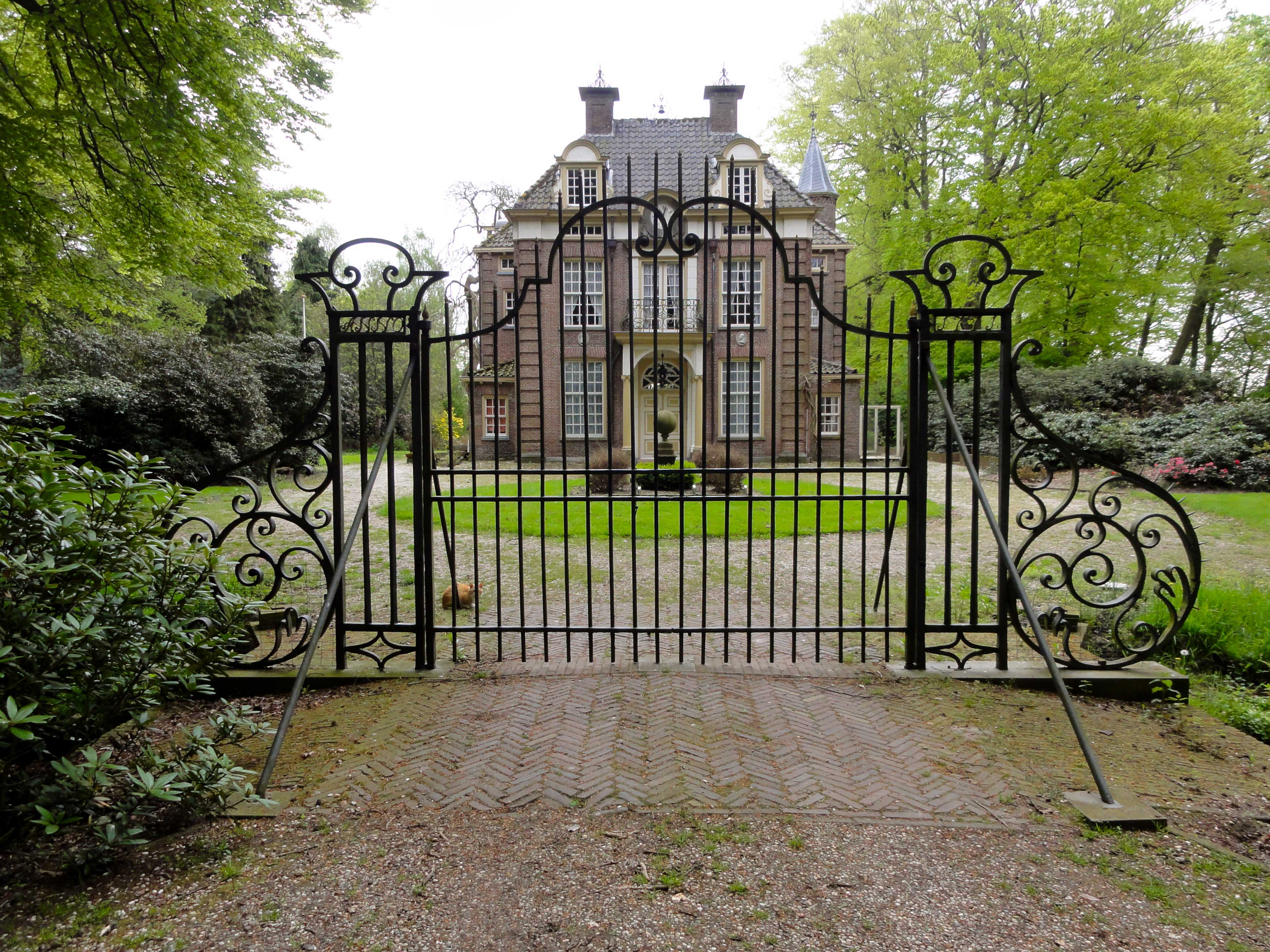
Huize Morren
