= Arnold Stam =

Dutch former speed skater and cyclist (born 1968)

Personal information
- Born: 17 September 1968 (age 58) Sprang-Capelle, North Brabant, Netherlands
- Years active: 1988–2005

Sport
- Sport: Marathon speed skating Cycling
- Events: 5000 m speed skating 10 000 m speed skating Artificial ice Natural ice Road bicycle racing Time trial
- Club: IJsclub De IJsvrienden

Arnold Stam (born 17 September 1968) is a Dutch former marathon speed skater, long-track speed skater, and cyclist.

== Biography ==
Stam gained prominence primarily as a marathon speed skater. He won two marathon classics: the Ankeveen Three-Day event in February 1996 and the Noorder Rondritten, held four days after the Elfstedentocht, in January 1997. In that Elfstedentocht, Stam crossed the finish line fifth among the lead group.

Stam also performed well on artificial ice rinks. For instance, he won the Dutch artificial ice marathon skating championship in 1995, his sixth victory on artificial ice, and claimed the Royal Dutch Skating Federation (Koninklijke Nederlandsche Schaatsenrijders Bond; KNSB) Cup during the 1994–1995 season. Before that season, it did not look as though Stam would have such a successful year; he had undergone nose surgery in September 1994, which forced him to rest for four weeks. Additionally, he won the unofficial world title on artificial ice in 1994. He considered the Dutch title the highlight of his career, largely because he crossed the finish line solo.

Stam retired as an A-division skater in 2005. He won the Dutch Masters marathon skating championship on natural ice in both 2009 and 2010. His son Remco Stam (born 2003) is also a professional skater. Furthermore, his other sons, Danny Stam and Maikel Stam, are active as (marathon) skaters.

== Personal bests ==
Distance	Time	Date	Track
500 m	42.00	14 March 1988	(Netherlands) Heerenveen
1000 m	1:23.84	27 December 1987	(Netherlands) Eindhoven
1500 m	2:02.40	16 December 1988	(Netherlands) Heerenveen
3000 m	4:11.10	16 December 1988	(Netherlands) Heerenveen
5000 m	7:00.39	28 December 1993	(Netherlands) Heerenveen
10 000 m	14:25.89	4 December 1993	(Netherlands) Heerenveen

== Long-track speed skating results ==
Year	NK Standings
1989	14th 5000 m
1990	18th 5000 m 16th 10 000 m
1991	6th 5000 m (bronze) 10 000 m
1992	9th 5000 m 5th 10 000 m
1993	7th 5000 m 4th 10 000 m
1994	9th 5000 m DQ 10 000 m
1997	13th 5000 m

=== Medal table ===
Championship	Go1d (gold)	Silver (silver)	Bronze (bronze)
NK Distance	0	0	1

== Marathon speed skating results ==
=== Results in major competitions ===
Year	NK artificial ice	NK natural ice	Open NK natural ice	KNSB Cup standing	Heineken Zesdaagse	Aegon Vijfdaagse	The Greenery Six	Jaap Eden Trophy	Alternative Elfstedentocht	Elfstedentocht
1989					10th			20th		
1990				8th		6th		7th		
1991	21st			3rd place, bronze medalist(s)				4th		
1992	5th							3rd place, bronze medalist(s)		
1993	2nd place, silver medalist(s)	withdrew	5th	2nd place, silver medalist(s)				1st place, gold medalist(s)	1st place, gold medalist(s)	
1994	6th	2nd place, silver medalist(s)		6th				5th		
1995	1st place, gold medalist(s)		24th	1st place, gold medalist(s)				4th		
1996	16th	16th	9th	3rd place, bronze medalist(s)				20th		
1997	3rd place, bronze medalist(s)	6th	6th	11th				7th	7th	5th
1998	withdrew		49th	6th				17th	4th	
1999	12th		23rd	18th				23rd	21st, (silver)	
2000	withdrew		13th	19th			27th	15th	5th, 11th	
2001			19th	46th				38th		
2002	54th		17th	19th						
2003	28th		11th	40th						
2004	37th			52nd				37th	9th	
2005			11th						21st	
2006			46th							
2007			57th							

=== Results in natural-ice classics ===
Year	De 100 van Eernewoude	Driedaagse van Ankeveen	Noorder Rondritten	Hollands Venetiëtocht	Klassieker Cup
1996	2nd place, silver medalist(s)	1st place, gold medalist(s)		3rd place, bronze medalist(s)	5th
1997			1st place, gold medalist(s)		14th

=== Medal table ===
Championship	Go1d (gold)	Silver (silver)	Bronze (bronze)
NK artificial ice	1	1	1
NK natural ice	0	1	0
KNSB Cup standing	1	1	2
Natuurijsklassiekers	2	1	1
Alternative Elfstedentocht	1	1	0
Competitions on artificial ice	18	8	13

== Cycling ==
Stam was a highly accomplished cyclist. His greatest victory on the bicycle was the Dutch time trial championship in 1992.

=== Key results ===
1992

- Dutch National Time Trial Championships

1993

- 1st in Stage 2 of the Ster van Brabant
- 3rd in Stage 9b of Olympia's Tour

1994

- 1st in Stage 6 of the Teleflex Tour

Sources:

- Profile of Arnold stam at Schaatspeloton.nl
- Profile of Arnold stam at Schaatsstatistieken.nl
- Profile of Arnold stam at Speedskatingresults.com
- Profile of Arnold stam at de Wielersite.net
