= Oosterwolde, Gelderland =

Oosterwolde
- Village
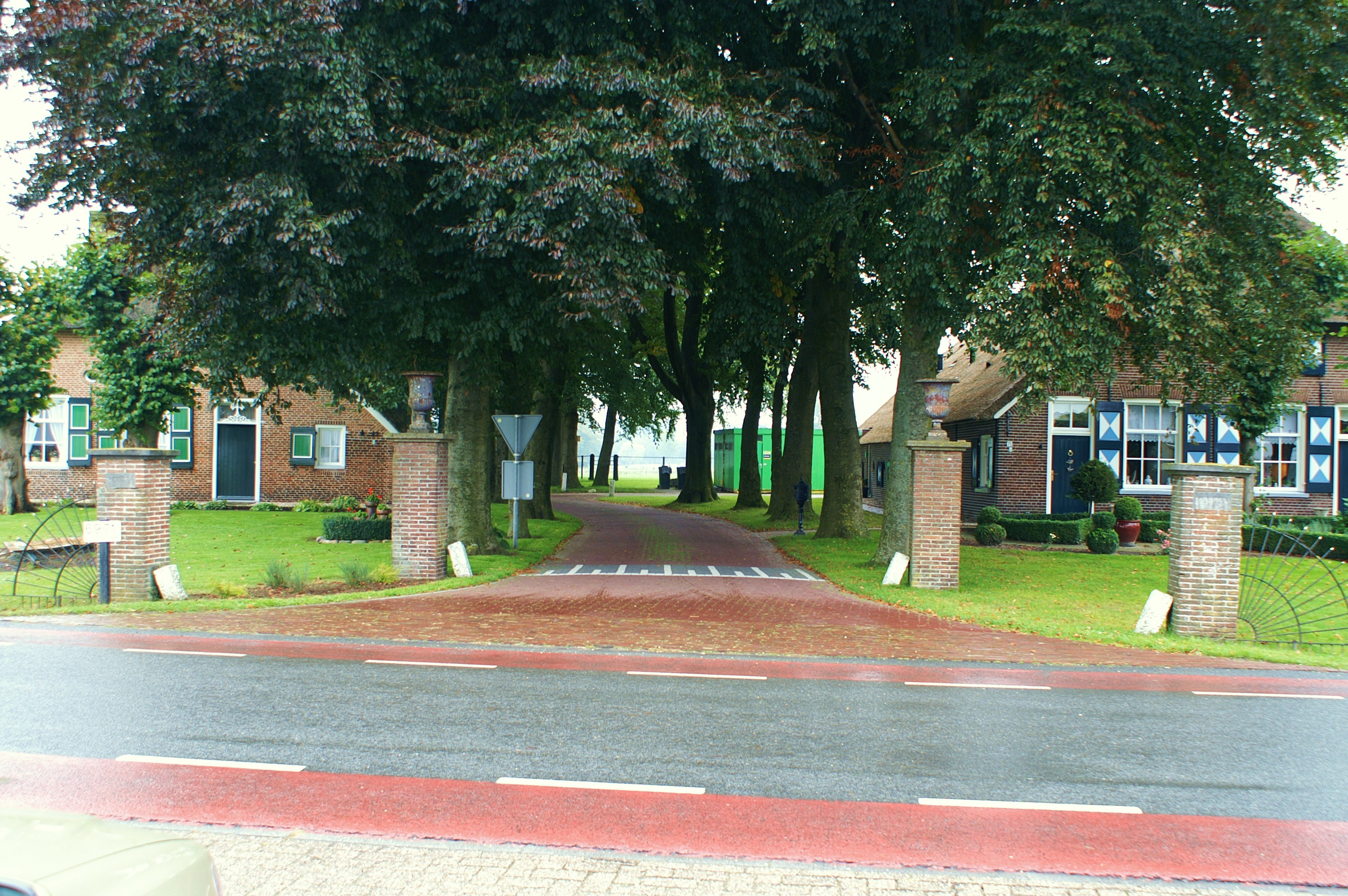
- Fence pillars to the Huis Morren estate in Oosterwolde

- Location of Noordeinde in the province of Gelderland Oosterwolde (Netherlands)
- Coordinates: 52°27′52″N 5°53′41″E
- Country: Netherlands
- Province: Gelderland
- Municipality: Oldebroek

Area
  - Total: 28.90 km^{2} (11.16 sq mi)
- Elevation: 1 m (3.3 ft)

Population (2021)
  - Total: 2,465
  - Density: 85.29/km^{2} (220.9/sq mi)
- Time zone: UTC+1 (CET)
  - Summer (DST): UTC+2 (CEST)
- Postal code: 8097
- Dialing code: 0525

Oosterwolde is a village in the Dutch province of Gelderland. It is located in the municipality of Oldebroek, about 15 km southwest of Zwolle. Oosterwolde was a separate municipality until 1818, when it was merged with Doornspijk.

== History ==
Oosterwolde was first mentioned in 1265 as "Gherardus de Ostenwalde", and means eastern forest. De Morren is an estate which was built in 1771. In 1910, it was extended to its current size. In 1840, it was home to 332 people. In 1845, a church was built and it developed into a village. In 1860, the gristmill "De Zon" was built in Oosterwolde, however it burnt down in 1976.

== Gallery ==
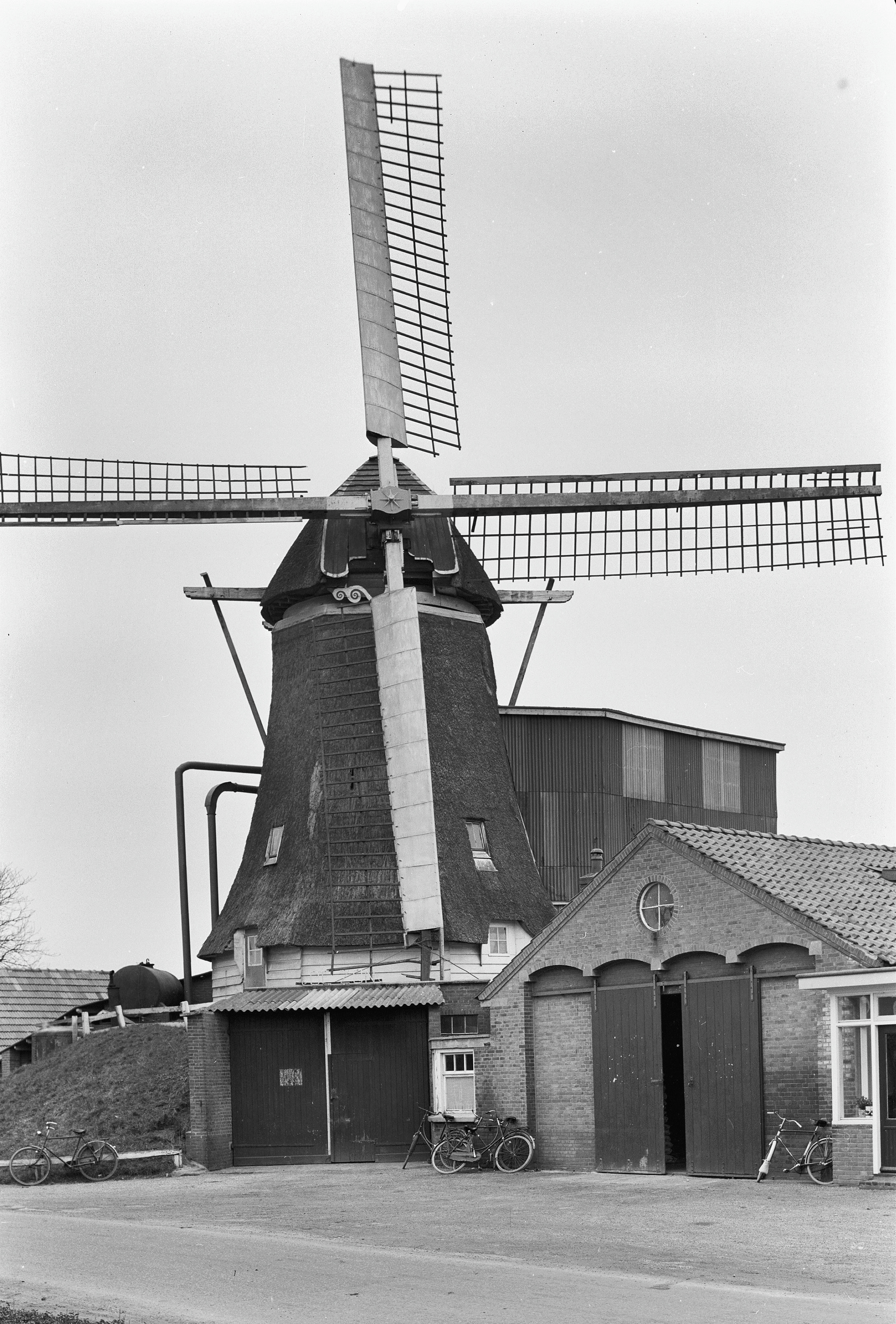
Former windmill "De Zon"

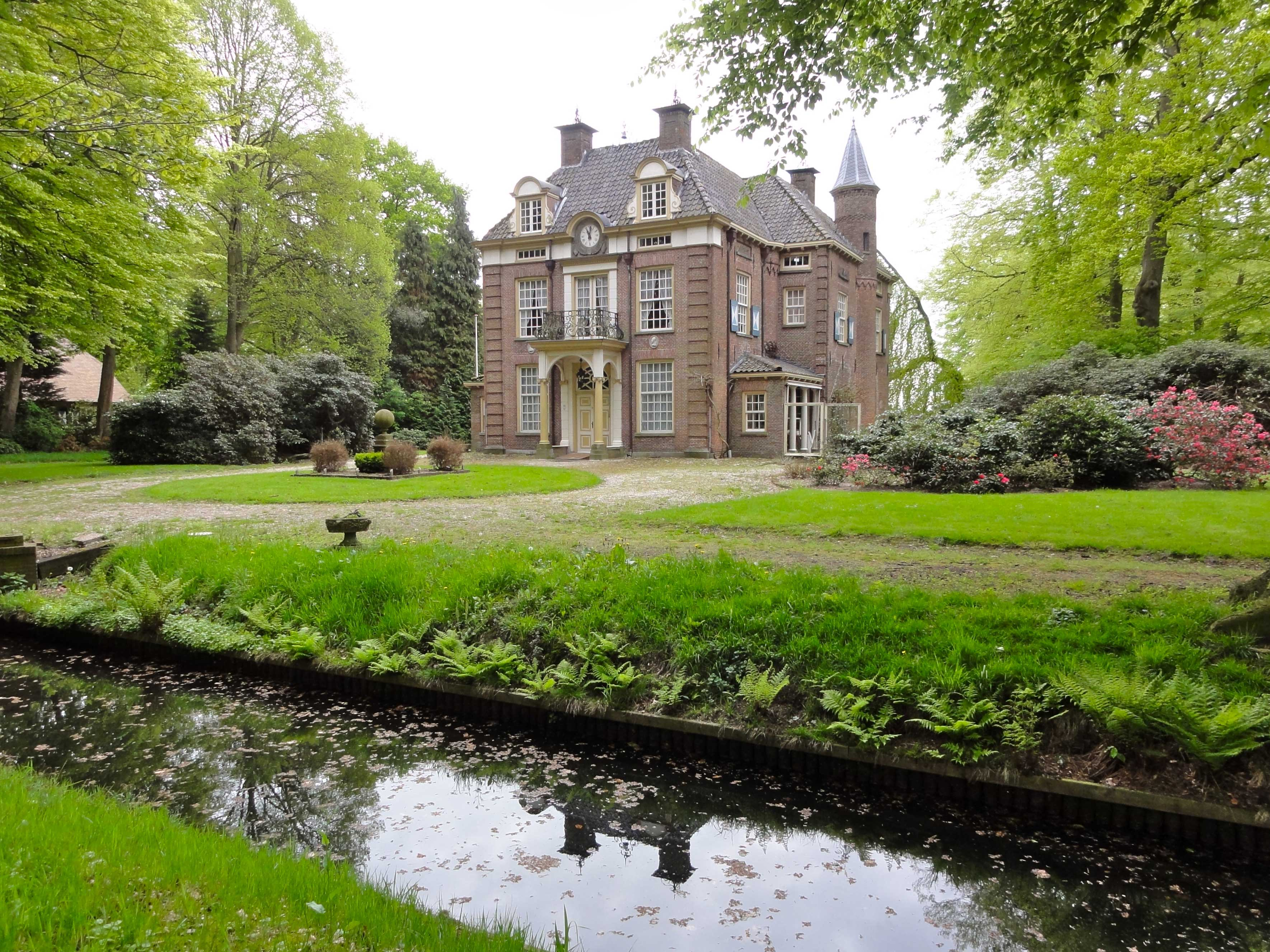
Huis Morren

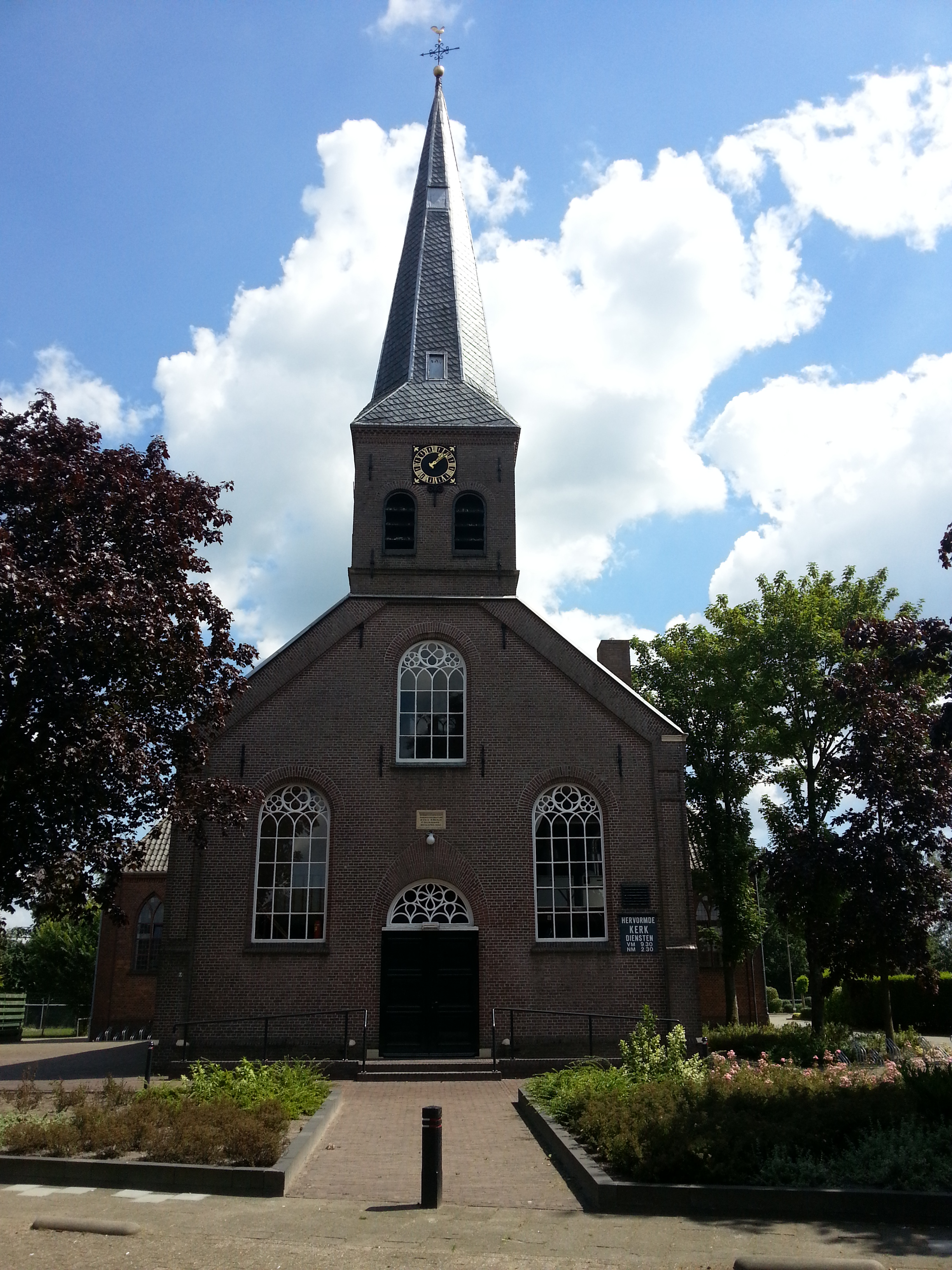
Church in Oosterwolde

== Notable people ==
- Dries van Wijhe (born 1945), speed skater and cyclist
