= Lex Cazemier =

Dutch former speed skater (born 1958)

- Lex Cazemier, Henri Ruitenberg and Jos Pronk (1985)

Personal information
- Born: 19 December 1958 (age 67) Groningen, Groningen, Netherlands
- Years active: 1977–1992

Sport
- Sport: Marathon speed skating
- Event: Marathon speed skating

Lex Arend Cazemier (born 19 December 1958) is a Dutch former long-track and marathon speed skater.

== Career ==
Cazemier became the Dutch champion in marathon speed skating on artificial ice in 1985. He also finished second three times in this championship. On natural ice, he placed second in the 1985 Noorder Rondritten after Albert Bakker fell two kilometres from the finish and Cazemier waited for him; Cazemier subsequently lost to Bakker in the final sprint. Cazemier skated the Elfstedentocht in 1985 and 1986, with a 29th-place finish in 1985 as his best performance.

He is married to fellow speed skater Ypie op de Hoek. Their son Pim Cazemier also speed-skates and won gold in the 1500 metres and team pursuit at the 2009 World Junior Speed Skating Championships.

== Personal bests ==
Distance	Time	Date	Track
500 m	41.60	28 November 1978	(Netherlands) Groningen
1000 m	1:23.10	27 December 1977	(Austria) Innsbruck
1500 m	2:08.00	26 December 1977	(Austria) Innsbruck
3000 m	4:27.40	28 December 1977	(Austria) Innsbruck
5000 m	7:37.90	26 February 1981	(Netherlands) Groningen
10 000 m	15:51.92	27 January 1985	(Netherlands) Groningen

== Marathon speed skating results ==
=== Results in major competitions ===
Year	NK artificial ice	NK natural ice	Open NK natural ice	Jaap Eden Trophy	KNSB Cup standing	Heineken Zesdaagse	Aegon Vijfdaagse	Elfstedentocht
1981				13th				
1982				14th				
1983	12th			2nd place, silver medalist(s)	17th			
1984					14th	10th		
1985	1st place, gold medalist(s)	withdrew			3rd place, bronze medalist(s)	2nd place, silver medalist(s)		29th
1986				11th	5th	5th		174th
1987	2nd place, silver medalist(s)			4th	9th	2nd place, silver medalist(s)		
1988	2nd place, silver medalist(s)				7th			
1989					19th	14th		
1990	2nd place, silver medalist(s)		17th	11th	7th		11th	
1991		withdrew						
1992	9th				22nd			
1993		withdrew			13th			

=== Results in natural-ice classics ===
Year	Noorder Rondritten
1985	2nd place, silver medalist(s)

=== Medal table ===
Championship	Gold (gold)	Silver (silver)	Bronze (bronze)
NK artificial ice	1	3	0
KNSB Cup standing	0	0	1
Natuurijsklassiekers	0	0	1
Meerdaagse	0	1	0
Races on artificial ice	10	15	12

Sources:

- Profile of Lex Cazemier at Schaatspeloton.nl
- Profile of Lex Cazemier at Marathonschaatsenutrecht.nl
