= Henk Portengen =

Dutch former speed skater (born 1948)

Gerrit Hendrik Portengen
Personal information
- Nickname: Heneken Henkie
- Born: 17 August 1948 (age 78) Amsterdam, North Holland, Netherlands
- Years active: 1971–1988

Sport
- Sport: Marathon speed skating
- Events: Long distances in marathons
- Club: HC Amsterdam
- Coached by: Jos Geijssel

Portengen at the 1986 Elfstedentocht; on the left, wearing number 58.

Gerrit Hendrik ("Henk") Portengen (born 17 August 1948) is a Dutch former marathon speed skater.

== Career ==
Portengen is short-track speed skater and skating administrator Gerrit Portengen's (1922–2021) son. He won the Dutch marathon speed skating championships on artificial ice twice and became the first Dutch marathon speed skating champion on natural ice in 1979. He also triumphed four times at the Jaap Eden Trophy; he won the inaugural edition in 1971, followed by victories in 1972, 1975, and 1980. Furthermore, he topped the final standings of the Royal Dutch Skating Federation (Koninklijke Nederlandsche Schaatsenrijders Bond; KNSB) Cup twice, in 1974 and 1983.

Also, Portengen completed the Elfstedentocht in 1985, 1986, and 1997. His 14th-place finish in 1986 was his best performance. In 1989, 1992, and 1994, Portengen won the Dutch Masters marathon speed skating championships on artificial ice.

=== First NK Natural Ice Championship ===
Portengen competed in the inaugural Dutch National Marathon Skating Championship on natural ice in 1979. The race covered 100 kilometres, split into eight laps, on the Loosdrechtse Plassen. With four kilometres remaining, Dries van Wijhe broke away, prompting Portengen to give chase alongside skaters such as Albert Weijs, Ton Groot, and Johan Wardenier. Eventually, the group came together and opened up a lead of more than a hundred metres over the rest of the field. The race concluded with a sprint initiated by Wardenier, but Portengen was the first to cross the finish line. He became the first Dutch national champion on natural ice. Portengen had never before skated such a long distance on outdoor ice.

== Marathon speed skating results ==
=== Results in major competitions ===
Year	NK artificial ice	NK natural ice	Open NK natural ice	Jaap Eden Trophy	KNSB Cup standing	Heineken Zesdaagse	Alternative Elfstedentocht	Elfstedentocht
1971				1st place, gold medalist(s)				
1972				1st place, gold medalist(s)				
1973	11th			8th	2nd place, silver medalist(s)			
1974	14th			5th	1st place, gold medalist(s)			
1975	1st place, gold medalist(s)			1st place, gold medalist(s)	9th		9th	
1976	3rd place, bronze medalist(s)			7th	5th		4th, 5th	
1977	12th			13th	5th		9th	
1978	1st place, gold medalist(s)			6th	3rd place, bronze medalist(s)			
1979	8th	1st place, gold medalist(s)		8th	4th			
1980				1st place, gold medalist(s)	3rd place, bronze medalist(s)			
1981	2nd place, silver medalist(s)			7th	3rd place, bronze medalist(s)			
1982	13th			2nd place, silver medalist(s)	2nd place, silver medalist(s)			
1983	8th				1st place, gold medalist(s)	6th		
1984	17th				9th		3rd place, bronze medalist(s)	
1985	10th			7th	9th		80th	24th
1986	8th							14th
1997			31st					59th

=== Results in natural-ice classics ===
Year	Amstelmeer Marathon	Hollands Venetiëtocht	Veluwermeer- tocht	USA Marathon
1980			11th	
1982	1st place, gold medalist(s)			
1985		2nd place, silver medalist(s)		
1986				3rd place, bronze medalist(s)
1997	25th			

=== Results for veteran speed skating ===
1988
(silver) Heineken Zesdaagse veteranen
1989
(gold) NK kunstijs veteranen
(silver) Heineken Zesdaagse veteranen
(silver) KNSB Cup veteranen
1990
(silver) Open NK natuurijs veteranen
(bronze) Aegon Vijfdaagse veteranen
1991
(silver) NK natuurijs veteranen
1992
(gold) NK kunstijs veteranen
(silver) KNSB Cup veteranen
1993
(bronze) Open NK natuurijs veteranen
(gold) KNSB Cup veteranen
1994
(gold) NK kunstijs veteranen
(gold) KNSB Cup veteranen
1995
(silver) Open NK natuurijs veteranen
(silver) KNSB Cup veteranen
1996
(silver) NK kunstijs veteranen
(silver) USA marathon veteranen
(silver) Open NK natuurijs veteranen
1997
(silver) KNSB Cup veteranen

== Awards ==
- 2023: Knight ("Ridder") in the Order of Orange-Nassau.

Sources:

- Profile of Henk Portegen at Schaatspeloton.nl
- Profile of Henk Portegen at Marathonschaatsenutrecht.nl
