= Richard van Kempen =

Dutch former speed skater (born 1964)

- Van Kempen after marathon victory in Haarlem (1987).

Personal information
- Nickname: "Poeske"
- Born: 23 August 1964 (age 62) Alphen aan den Rijn, South Holland, Netherlands
- Years active: 1984–1996

Sport
- Sport: Marathon speed skating
- Events: Long distances and marathons

Richard van Kempen (born 23 August 1964) is a Dutch former marathon speed skater. He won the overall classification of the Royal Dutch Skating Federation (Koninklijke Nederlandsche Schaatsenrijders Bond; KNSB) Cup four times (1986, 1987, 1988, and 1992). He triumphed twice at the unofficial World Championships in Kuopio, Finland (1990 and 1991), won the Jaap Eden Trophy three times (1986, 1988, and 1990), secured two national titles, the Dutch championship on artificial ice (1991) and the Open Dutch championship on natural ice (1996), and won the Heineken Six-Day race twice (1986 and 1987).

== Career ==
=== Early years ===
When he was nine years old, Van Kempen moved with his parents to the village of De Hoef in the province of Utrecht. It was in the polder landscape surrounding his family home that he learnt to ice skate. During his youth, he also participated in athletics and cycling, before giving himself over wholly to ice skating from the age of seventeen. He joined the regional squad as a long-track speed skater, but he felt most at home in marathon skating. As a B-category skater, he scored one victory after another, and in 1984 he made the move up to the A-category.

=== Period of success ===
In the years after 1985, Van Kempen was by far the most successful athlete in marathon speed skating. His nickname was "Poeske" ("Little Cat"), a reference to his feline skating style and hunched back. He won the KNSB Cup in 1986, 1987, 1988, and 1992, and secured 47 marathon victories on artificial ice. All together, he achieved 112 victories over both artificial and natural ice. He also won the Heineken Six-Day race twice. In 1991, Van Kempen became the national marathon champion on artificial ice, and in 1996, he won the Open Dutch Marathon Championship on natural ice, held in Austria on the Plansee, near Reutte.

Between 1987 and 1990, Van Kempen competed four times in the Dutch national single-distance championships in the 10,000-metre event. On each occasion, he finished near the back of the field. His personal best for this long-distance event, set in December 1987 at the Thialf arena in Heerenveen, was 14:40.67.

Van Kempen achieved his victories mainly on artificial ice. He participated in only one edition of the Elfstedentocht (the thirteenth, in 1985), finishing in 92nd place. He also took part seven times in the Alternative Elfstedentocht in Finland. His last appearance there, on 2 March 1996, resulted in his greatest victory on natural ice and his first win in a 200-kilometre race; he proved the fastest in a final sprint among a group of fifteen skaters. This was the last race of his successful career, which he brought to a close at the age of 31.

=== After his career ===
Right after Van Kempen's active career in 1996, he became a team manager, working with outfits such as Nuon/Dasia, and an assistant coach for the BAM speed skating team. From August 2014 to October 2015, he served as the Marathon Competition Manager for the Royal Dutch Skating Association (KNSB). Later, he became the chair of the KNSB's Marathon Referees Committee. He was a thatcher by trade. In 1985, he joined his father's business, which he then took over in 2000. In 2017, he moved to the village of Unnaryd in Sweden. There, he became the manager of marathon races held on the frozen Gulf of Bothnia.

== Records ==
=== Personal bests ===
Distance	Time	Date	Track
500 m	42.10	14 March 1994	(Netherlands) Heerenveen
1000 m	1:28.00	9 March 1984	(Netherlands) Amsterdam
1500 m	2:08.40	29 January 1987	(Netherlands) Haarlem
3000 m	4:28.00	3 January 1988	(Netherlands) Haarlem
5000 m	7:24.10	14 March 1994	(Netherlands) Heerenveen
10 000 m	14:40.67	17 December 1987	(Netherlands) Heerenveen

== Long-track speed skating results ==
Year	NK distances
1987	9th 10 000 m
1988	14th 10 000 m
1989	12th 10 000 m
1990	19th 10 000 m

== Marathon speed skating results ==
=== Results in major competitions ===
Year	NK artificial ice	NK natural ice	Open NK natural ice	WK natural ice (unofficial)	Jaap Eden Trophy	KNSB Cup standing	Heineken Zesdaagse	Aegon Vijfdaagse	Alternative Elfstedentocht	Elfstedentocht
1985										91st
1986	5th				1st place, gold medalist(s)	1st place, gold medalist(s)	1st place, gold medalist(s)			
1987	withdrew	20th			9th	1st place, gold medalist(s)	1st place, gold medalist(s)		9th	
1988	5th				1st place, gold medalist(s)	1st place, gold medalist(s)	2nd place, silver medalist(s)			
1989	7th			3rd place, bronze medalist(s)	2nd place, silver medalist(s)	2nd place, silver medalist(s)				
1990			2nd place, silver medalist(s)	1st place, gold medalist(s)	1st place, gold medalist(s)	5th		1st place, gold medalist(s)	2nd place, silver medalist(s)	
1991	1st place, gold medalist(s)			1st place, gold medalist(s)		9th				
1992			withdrew			1st place, gold medalist(s)				
1993	withdrew	withdrew	4th	10th	10th	19th			3rd place, bronze medalist(s)	
1994	5th	14th		6th	7th	3rd place, bronze medalist(s)				
1995	5th		23rd		21st	10th				
1996		17th	1st place, gold medalist(s)			10th			7th, (gold)	

=== Results in natural-ice classics ===
Year	Amstelmeer Marathon	Westland Marathon	Driedaagse van Ankeveen	Noordwest- hoekrit	Hollands Venetiëtocht	Veluwemeer- tocht	Klassieker Cup
1987		5th	2nd place, silver medalist(s)				
1991	2nd place, silver medalist(s)			9th	13th		22nd
1996						7th	
1997			3rd place, bronze medalist(s)				18th

=== Medal table ===
Championship	Gold	Silver	Bronze
NK artificial ice	1	0	0
Open NK natural ice	1	1	0
KNSB Cup standing	4	1	1
Natural ice classics	0	2	1
Alternative Elfstedentocht	1	1	1
Meerdaagse	3	1	0
Competitions on artificial ice	47	36	16

Sources:

- Profile of Richard van Kempen at Schaatspeloton.nl
- Profile of Richard van Kempen at Marathonschaatsenutrecht.nl
- Profile of Richard van Kempen at Schaatsstatistieken.nl
- Witkamp, Anton and Leo van de Ruit (eindred.) De Top 500: de beste Nederlandse sporters van de eeuw. Maarssen, Premium Press (1999).
