= Ankeveen =

- Village
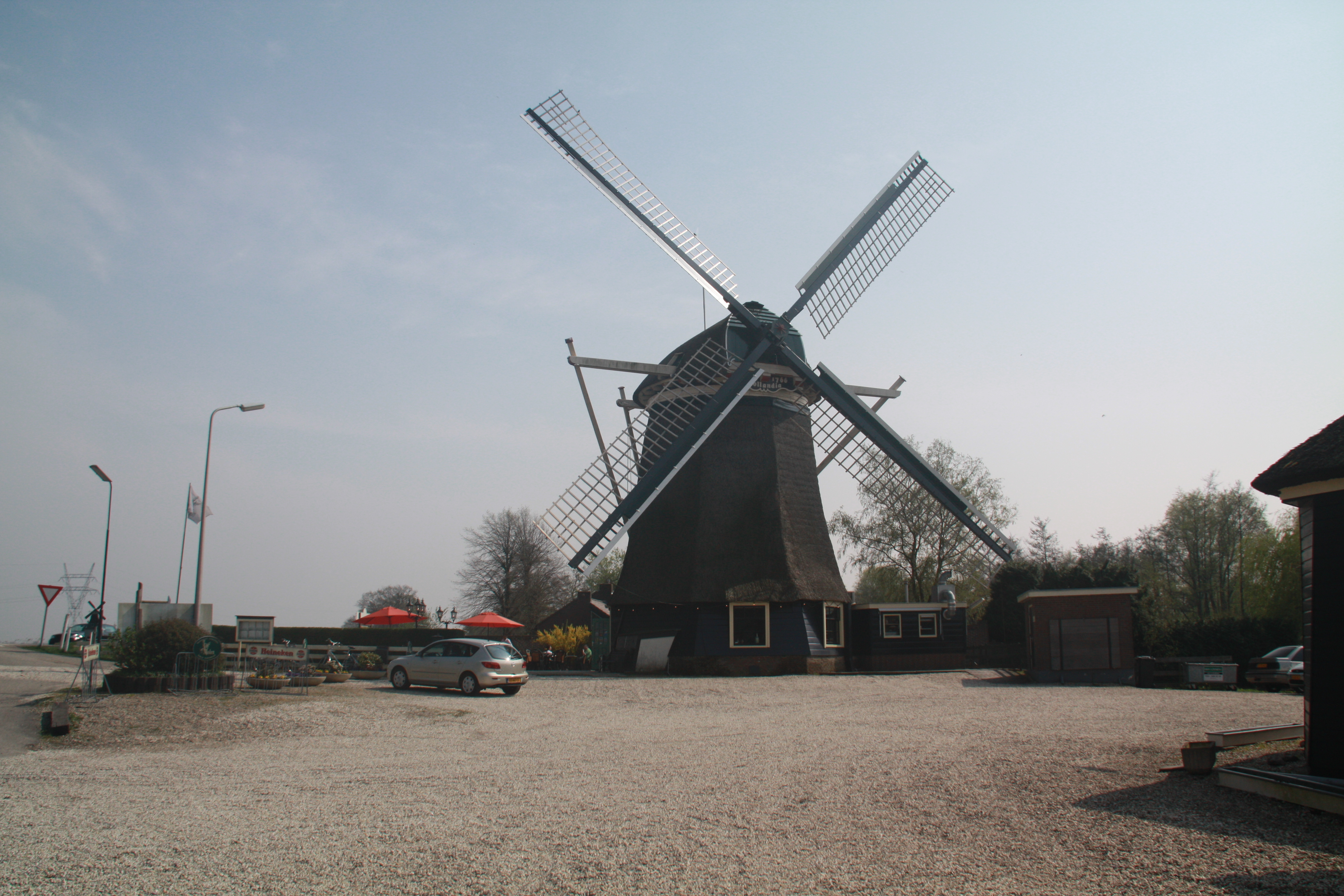

- Location in the Netherlands Location in the province of North Holland in the Netherlands
- Coordinates: 52.2653°N 5.0989°E
- Country: Netherlands
- Province: North Holland
- Municipality: Wijdemeren

Area
  - Total: 8.61 km^{2} (3.32 sq mi)
- Elevation: 0.0 m (0 ft)

Population (2021)
  - Total: 1,530
  - Density: 178/km^{2} (460/sq mi)
- Time zone: UTC+1 (CET)
  - Summer (DST): UTC+2 (CEST)
- Postal code: 1244
- Dialing code: 035

Ankeveen is a village in the Dutch province of North Holland. It is a part of the municipality of Wijdemeren, and lies about 5 km west of Bussum.

The village was first mentioned in 1344 as Tankenveen, and means "peat excavation of Tanke (person)". Ankeveen is a stretched out peat concession village.

The buitenplaats Berg en Vaart was built near Ankeveen between 1779 and 1782 by an Amsterdam wine merchant. It is surrounded by a large park designed in the 18th century.

West of the village, there is a fen area, the Ankeveense Plassen which is a result of the peat excavation in the area.

Until 1966, Ankeveen was a separate municipality. In 2002, it became part of the municipality of Wijdemeren.

== Gallery ==
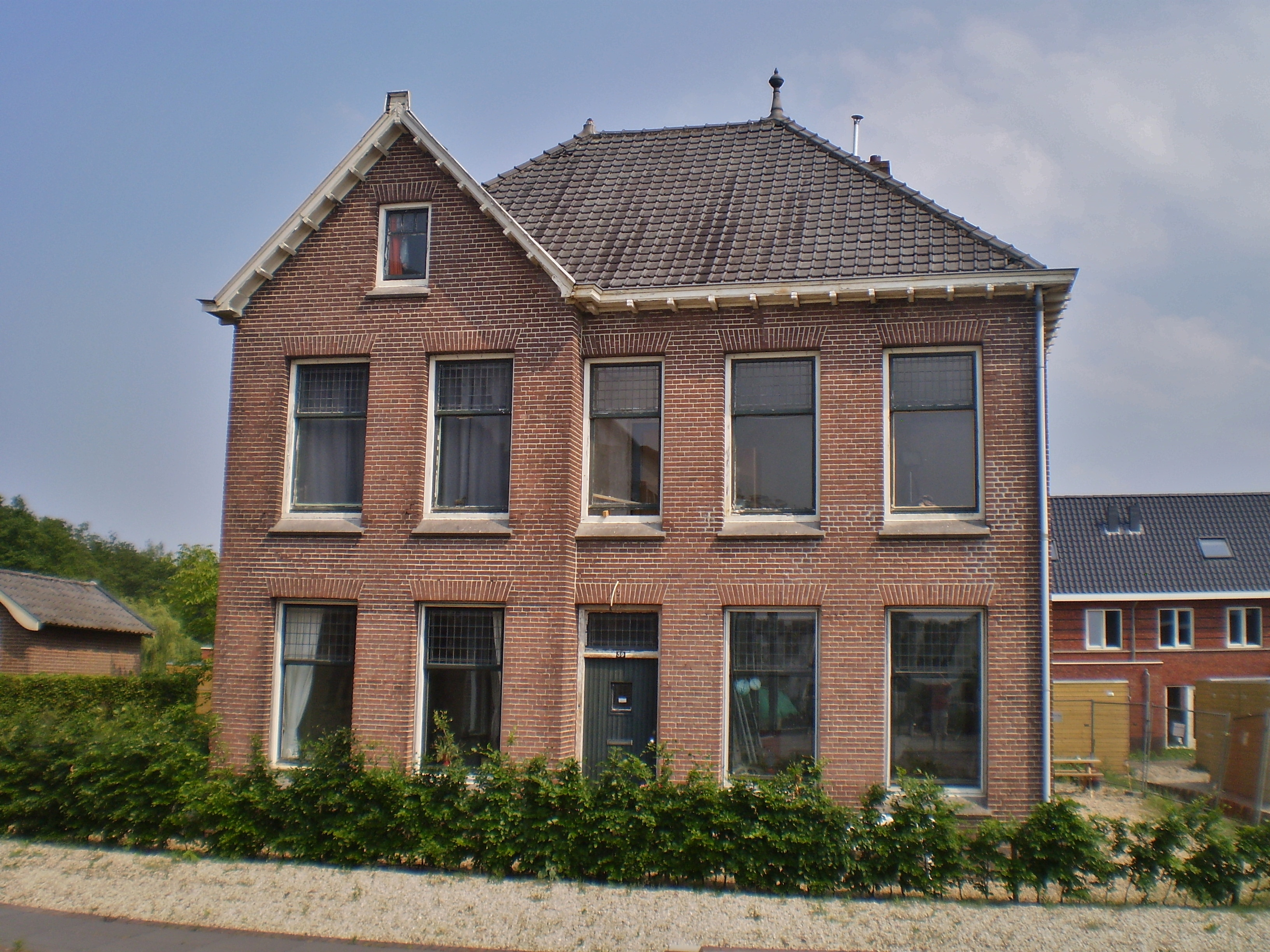
Clergy house

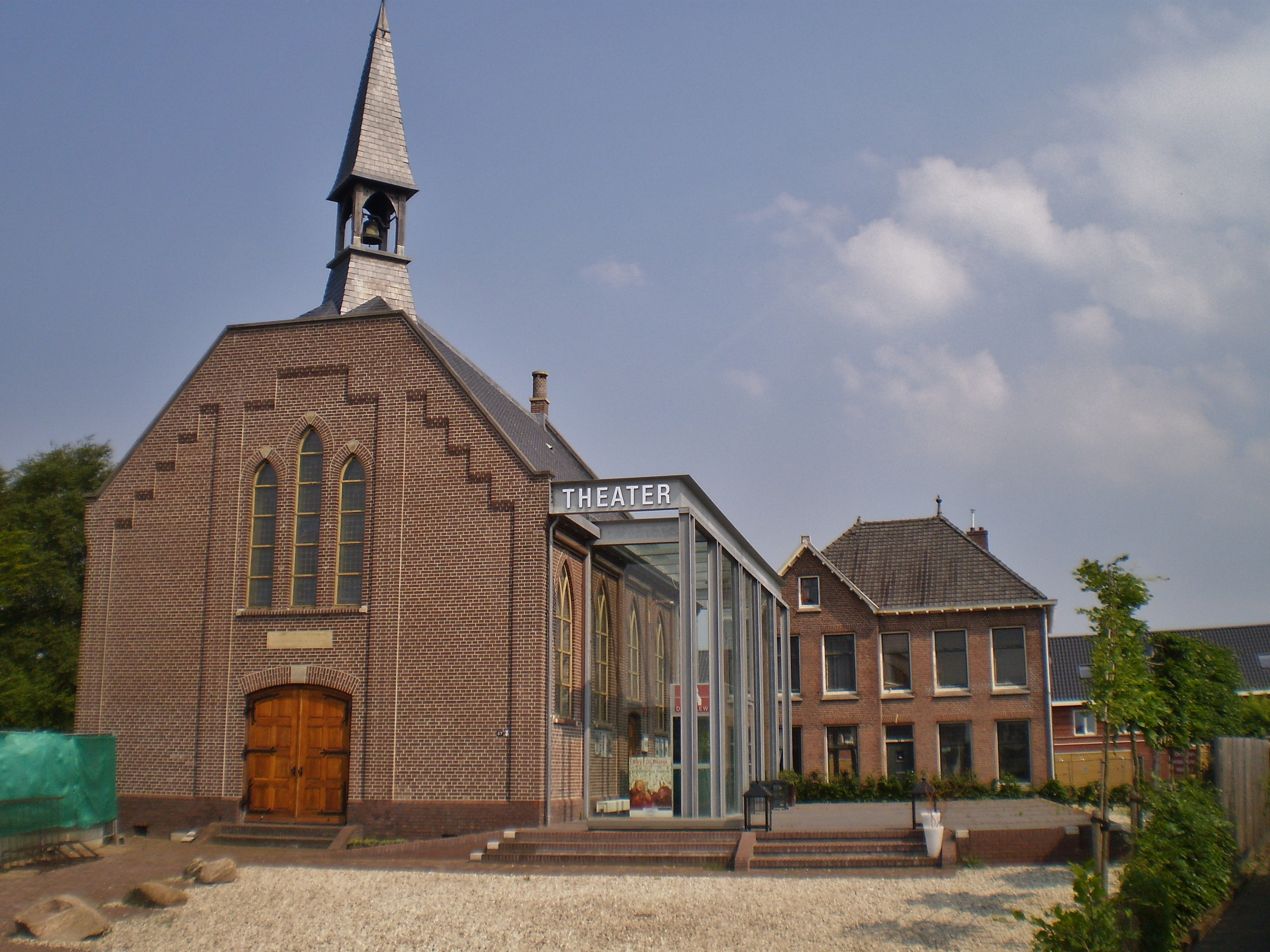
Former church now theatre

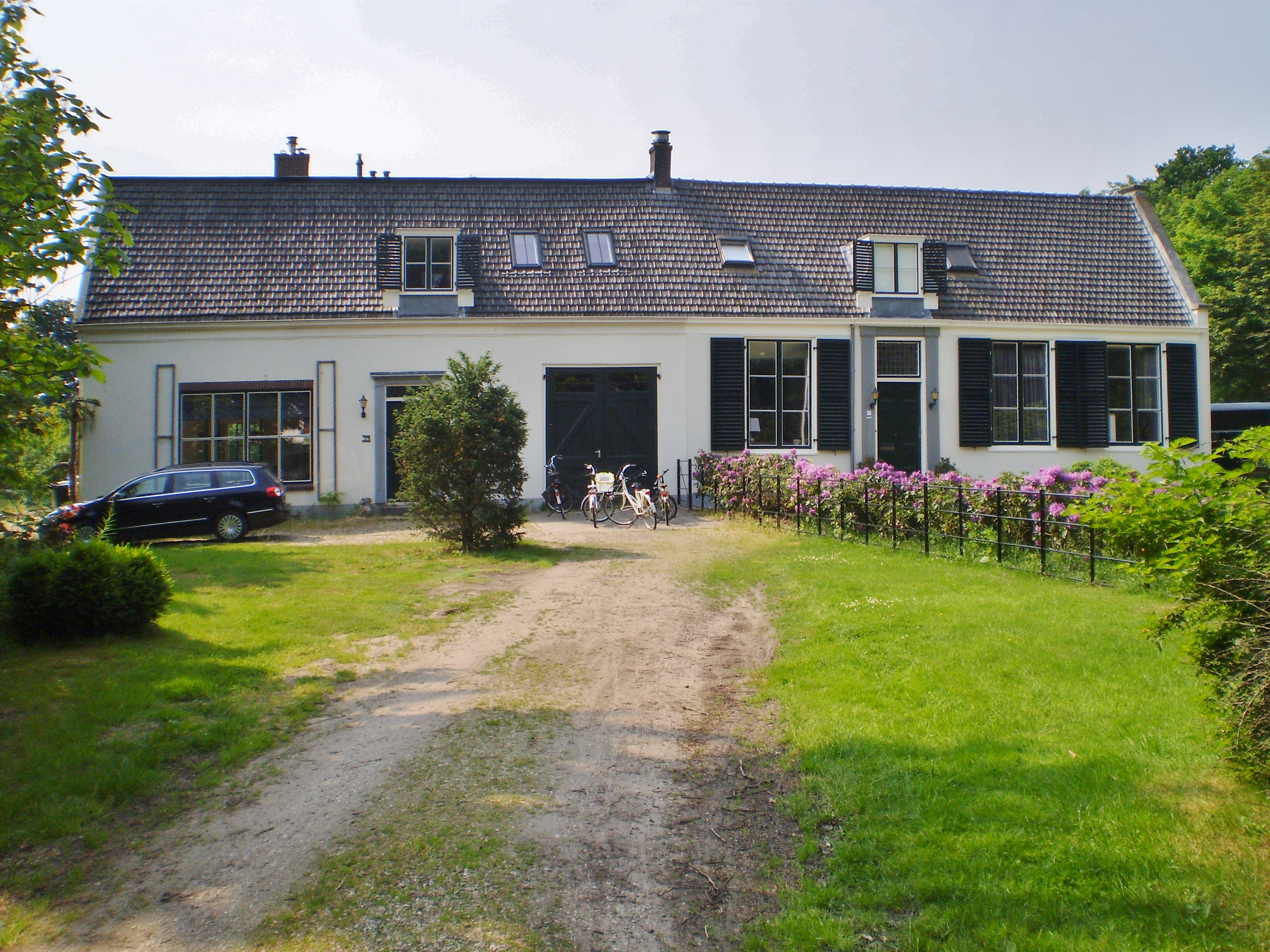
House in Ankeveen

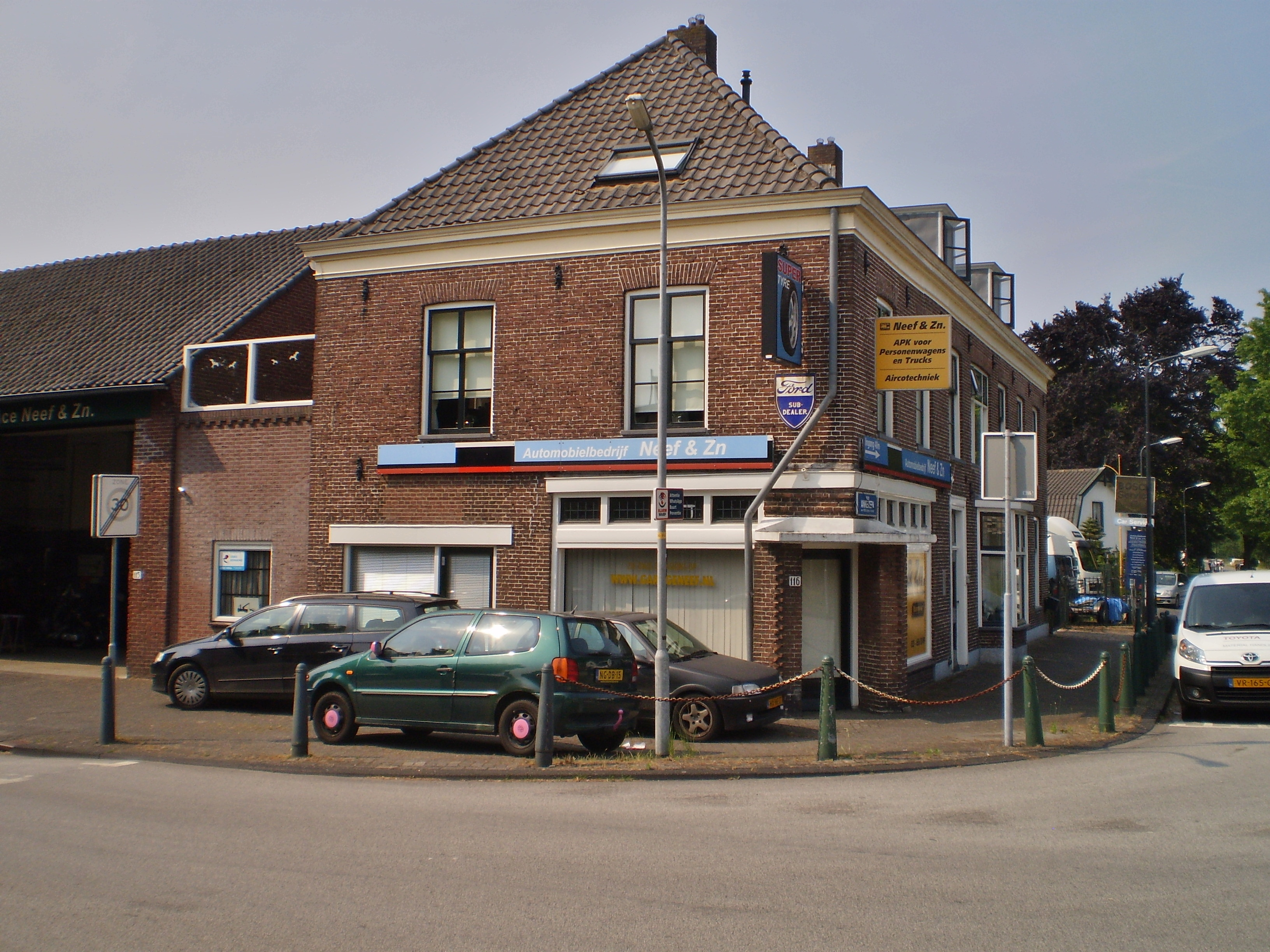
Shop in Ankeveen
