= Jan Roelof Kruithof =

Dutch speed skater (1936–2026)

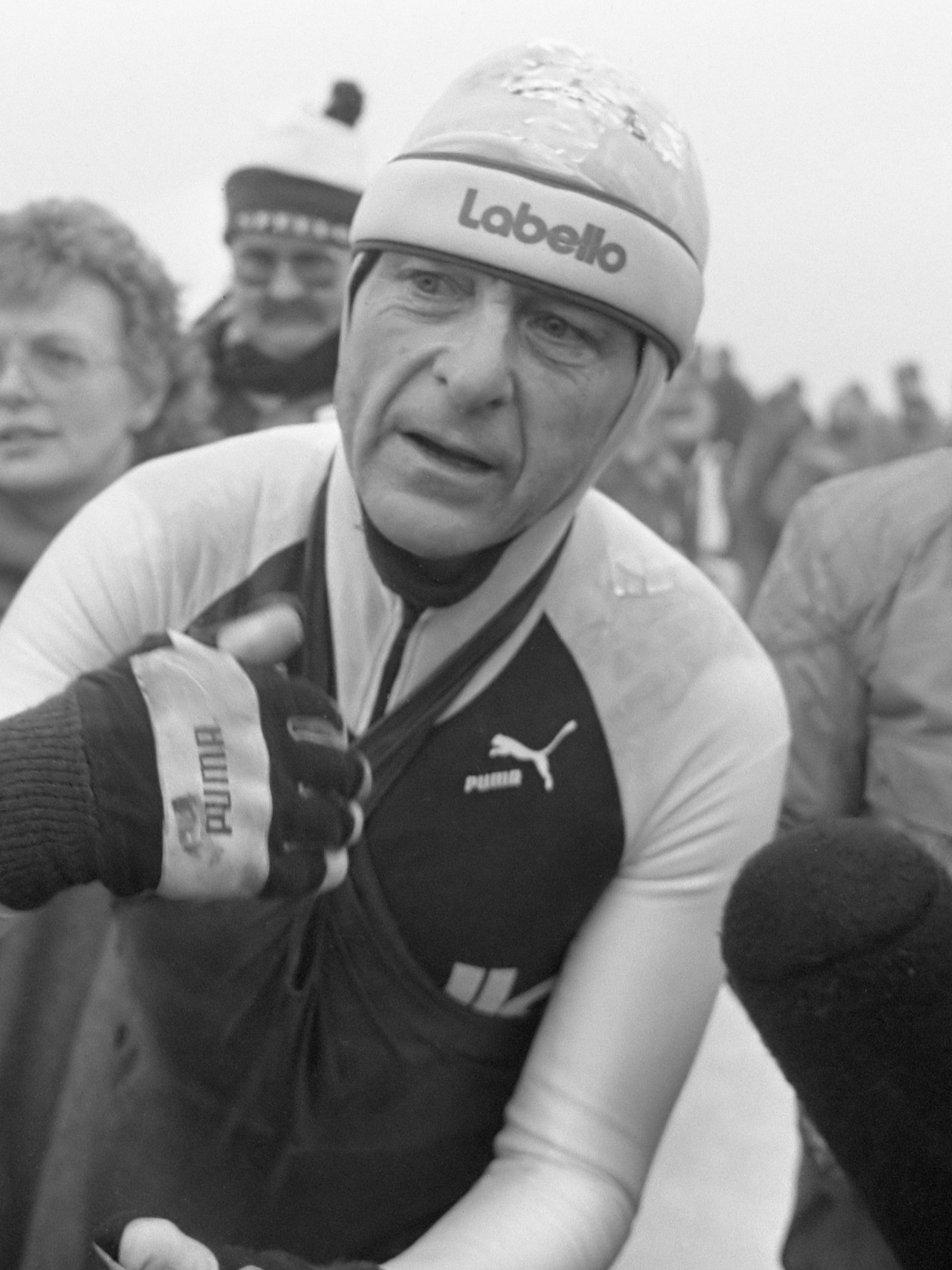
- Kruithof after his victory in the Veluwemeertocht in 1987.

Personal information
- Nicknames: De diesel uit Havelte (The diesel from Havelte)
- Born: 16 December 1936 Ouwsterhaule, Friesland, Netherlands
- Died: 3 October 2026 (aged 89)
- Years active: 1969–1989

Sport
- Sport: Marathon speed skating

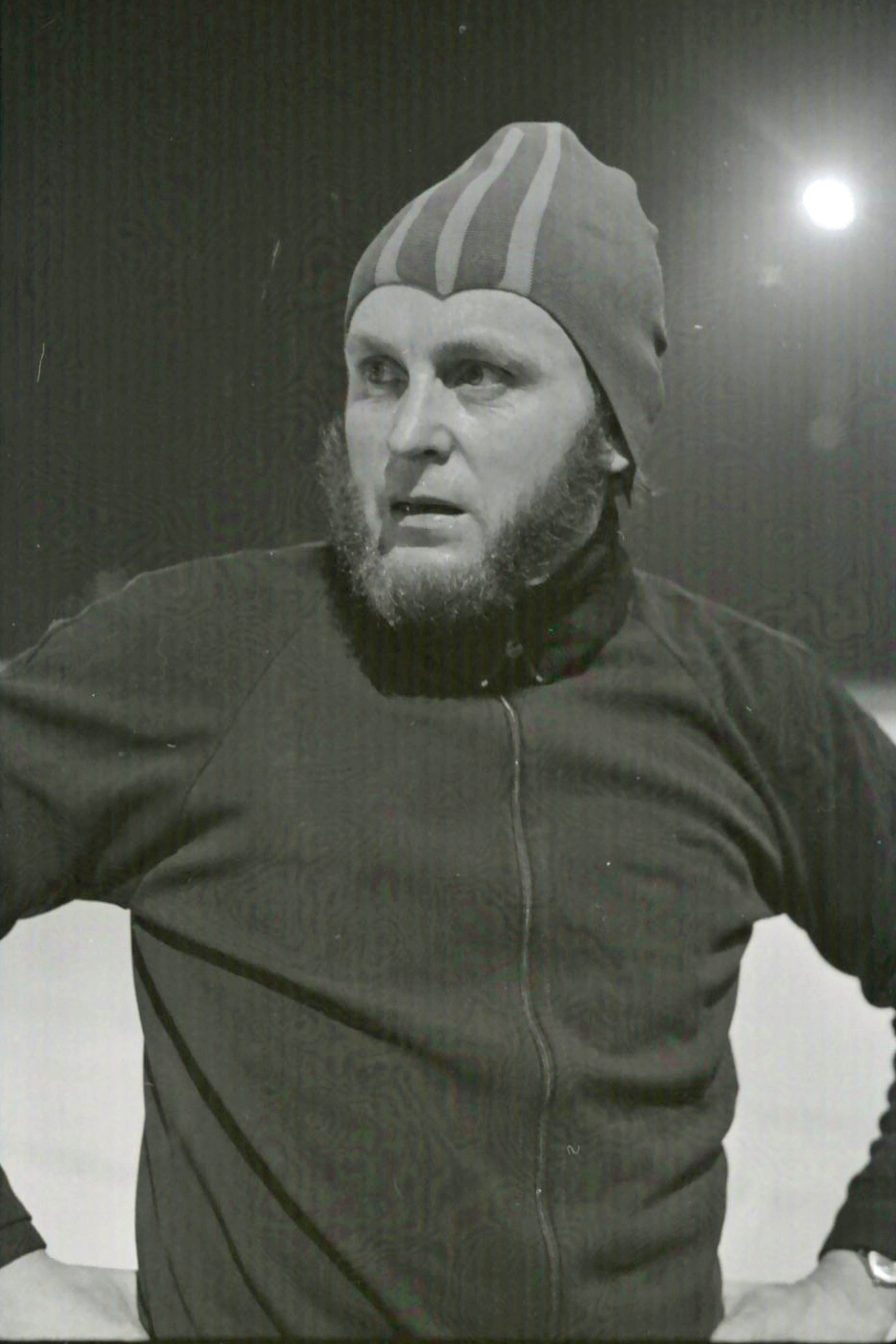
Jan Roelof Kruithof in 1972

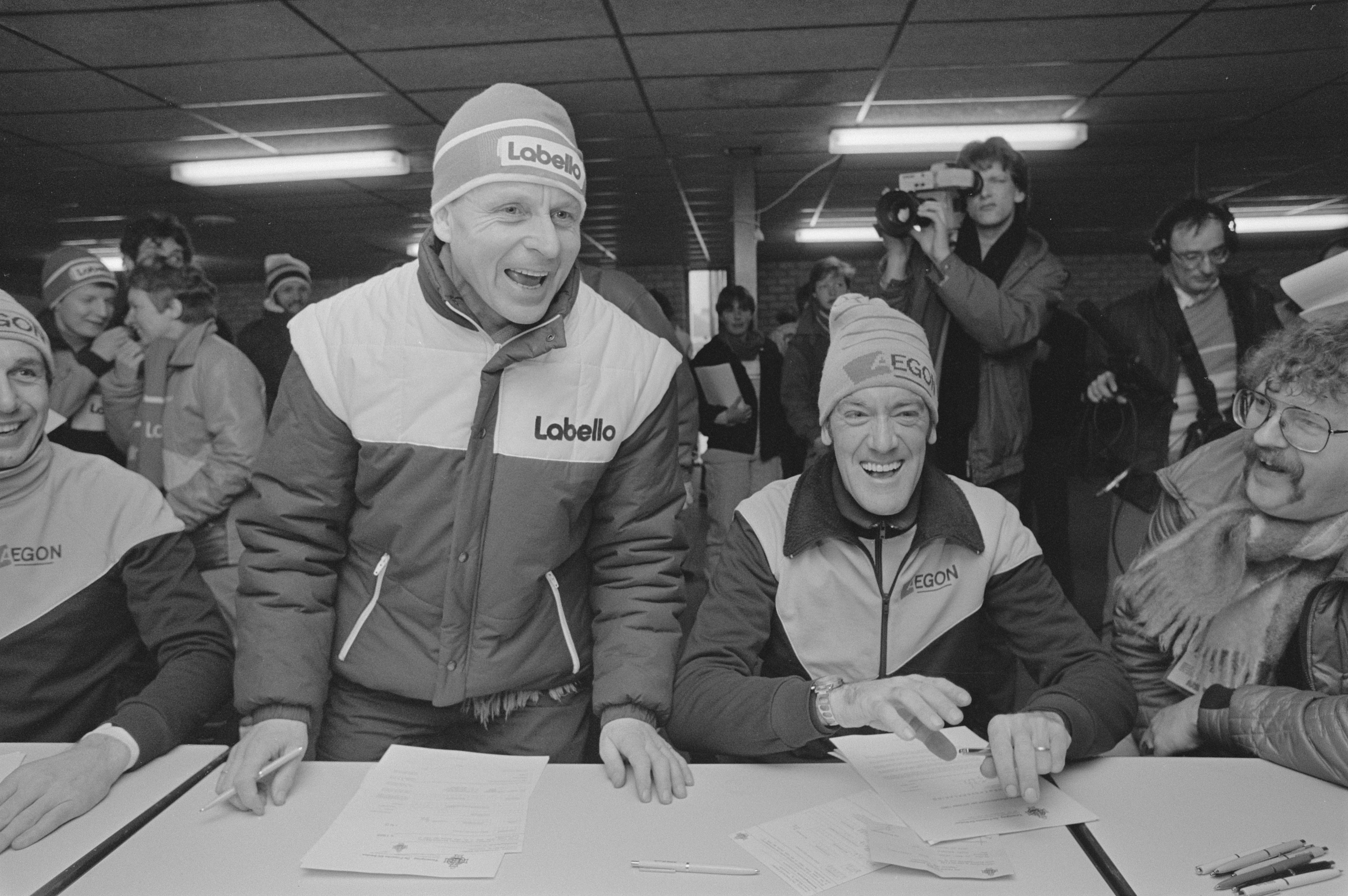
Elfstedentocht: registration of Kruithof (left) and Dries van Wijhe (right) during the registration for the 1985 Elfstedentocht.

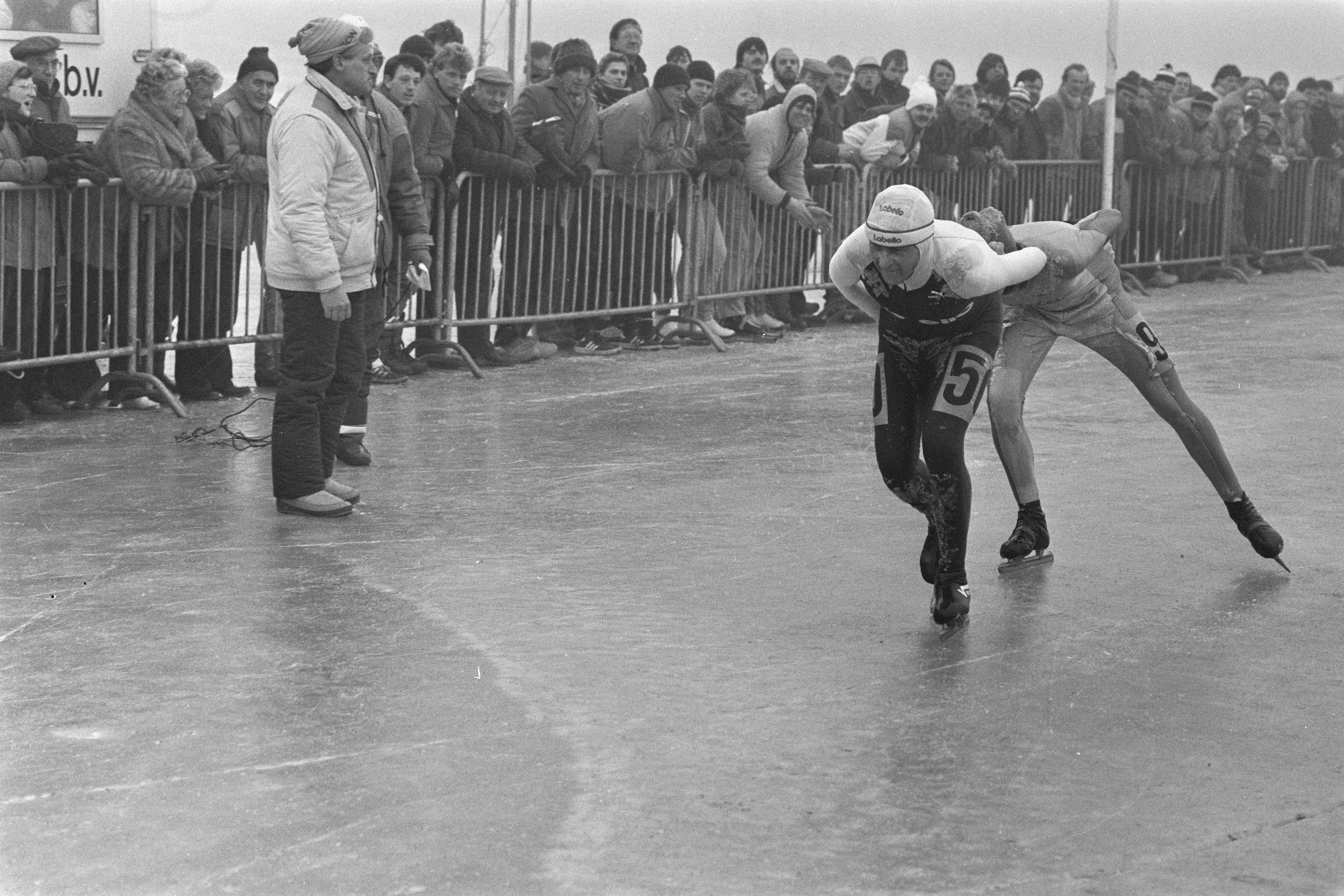
Kruithof in the lead during the Veluwemeertocht in 1987, followed by Piet Venema.

Jan Roelof Kruithof (16 December 1936 – 3 October 2026) was a Dutch marathon speed skater. He won the Alternative Elfstedentocht nine times. In his home country, he triumphed eight times in natural-ice classics: four times in the Oldambtrit (1969, 1976, 1978, and 1980), twice in the Hollands Venetiëtocht (1970 and 1972), and once each in the Veluwemeertocht (1987) and the Noordwesthoekrit (1985). He further earned the Elfstedenkruisje four times.

== Biography ==
=== Early years ===
Kruithof was born into a farming family in Ouwsterhaule, Friesland. When he was four, the family moved to a farm in Kolderveen, in southwestern Drenthe. After primary school, he enrolled in a vocational school in 1948 to train as a carpenter. Before and after school, he helped out at home by milking the cows. From the age of fourteen, he worked in the construction industry. He worked his way up to site supervisor and became a draughtsman at an architectural firm. He obtained his contractor's qualification in 1956 through an evening course. He moved to Havelte, where he started his own architectural firm in 1965. Meanwhile, he pursued an eight-year architectural training programme in the evenings, completing it in 1969.

It was only then, at the age of 32, that Kruithof began more intensive speed skating training. Before that, he had already participated in the Elfstedentocht twice, in 1956 and 1963. In 1969, he was skating laps at the Thialf rink in Heerenveen, which was still roofless at the time. There, he was discovered by Jeen van den Berg, who advised him to improve his skating technique.

Based on Kruithof's performances in qualifying races, he qualified for the national long-track B-championship in January 1972. However, the Royal Dutch Skating Federation (Koninklijke Nederlandsche Schaatsenrijders Bond; KNSB) did not allow him to compete, deeming him too old at the age of 35.

=== Alternatieve Elfstedentocht ===
Kruithof won the first international speed skating marathon, held on 28 March 1971, in Strömsund, Sweden. This 50-kilometre race was a forerunner to the Alternative Elfstedentocht. A year later, he triumphed once again in Strömsund.

In 1973, the competition took place in Brandbu/Jaren, Norway. This time, Kruithof finished second behind winner Johan Wardenier. Later that year, he had to undergo meniscus surgery. It hampered his preparations, yet on 2 March 1974, he won the first Alternative Elfstedentocht, covering 200 kilometres, in Lillehammer, Norway. He triumphed in Lahti, Finland, in 1976, 1981, and 1982, and in Oulu (also in Finland) in 1977, 1979, and 1980.

The 1983 Alternative Elfstedentocht took place in the United States. Kruithof proved the strongest on Lake Memphremagog in northern Vermont, on the border with Canada. On 10 March 1984, he won again in Kuopio, Finland. In 1991, he achieved another victory there in a 200-kilometre speed skating marathon.

=== Elfstedentocht ===
Kruithof participated in the Elfstedentocht five times and reached the finish line on every occasion. However, in 1963 he finished outside the time limit and did not receive an Elfsteden Cross. He took part as a recreational skater in his first race in 1956 and his last in 1997. His best performance was a twelfth-place finish in 1985. As a nineteen-year-old recreational skater, he participated in the 1956 Elfstedentocht. He completed the race without any problems. For the gruelling Elfstedentocht of 18 January 1963, he began racing as a competitive skater. He reached the finish line but did not receive the Cross, as he arrived after the time control in Leeuwarden had closed; the snow-blocked track meant that it took him two hours to cover the last eight kilometres.

In the 1970s and early 1980s, Kruithof was considered virtually unbeatable in races longer than 100 kilometres. Unfortunately for him, however, the Elfstedentocht was not held during this time of his life.

When the thirteenth Elfstedentocht finally took place in 1985, Kruithof was considered a strong contender, even though he was 48 years old by that time. Nevertheless, two falls while kluning in Kimswerd caused him to lose contact with the lead group, and he ultimately finished twelfth. He placed 52nd in the following year's Elfstedentocht. In the fifteenth Elfstedentocht in 1997, he finished as the first recreational skater, sharing the position with three others.

=== World hour record ===
On 16 February 1973, at the De Bonte Wever ice rink in Assen, Kruithof broke the one-hour world record set in 1968. He covered a distance of 35.24682 kilometres.

Nine days later, the record was broken again by Johan Wardenier, who skated 146 metres farther at the Thialf rink in Heerenveen. Three years later, Kruithof reclaimed the world hour record. On 23 February 1976, at the Inzell ice rink, he covered a distance of 36.971 kilometres. This record stood for five years until Jos Niesten outdid it.

In 1994, Kruithof set a record in Baselga di Piné for the longest distance skated in 24 hours: 655.600 kilometres. It was the third time he had outdone his own record, following his achievements in 1992 and 1993. Kruithof held the unofficial 24-hour ice skating world record for 31 years, until Jochem Kerssies improved it to 680.206 kilometres on 22 March 2025, at the Sportcentrum Kardinge ice rink in Groningen.

=== Natural-ice classics ===
Kruithof achieved his first major victory on New Year's Eve 1969. As a first-year skater, he won the Oldambtrit, a classic natural-ice race, by beating Jan van der Hoorn in the sprint. In the following three editions – 1976, 1978, and 1980 – he also crossed the finish line as the winner in Scheemda, Groningen, the permanent start and finish location of the Oldambtrit. Kruithof added three other classics to his list of victories. A week after his first triumph in the Oldambtrit, he won the Hollands Venetiëtocht on 7 January 1970. He repeated this on 2 February 1972.

He won the Noordwesthoekrit on 21 January 1985, a month before the Elfstedentocht took place. Kruithof crossed the finish line solo, with a lead of 1 minute and 20 seconds over the future Elfstedentocht winner Evert van Benthem.

On 21 January 1987, at the age of 50, Kruithof won another natural-ice classic: the Veluwemeertocht. This represented a comeback for him, as he had been dropped from the group of A-skaters in 1986.

Kruithof did not accept the demotion to the veterans' category and successfully challenged it before the KNSB's disputes committee. A year later, he voluntarily began competing in the veterans' category and became a member of the Marathon Skating Guidance Committee (Begeleidingscommissie Marathonschaatsen; BCM).

As well as speed skating, Kruithof competed in the winter triathlon, winning the national title in the veterans' category four times.

On 24 January 2016, the episode "Jan-Roelof Kruithof: Wachten op de Elfstedentocht" by Andere Tijden Sport was broadcast.

On Kruithof's 81st birthday, 16 December 2017, he was awarded the KNSB's "Golden Pin".

In February 2023, a glacial erratic with a plaque was unveiled in Kruithof's honour at Piet Soerplein in Havelte.

=== Death ===
On 3 October 2026, RTV Drenthe reported that Kruithof had died earlier that day at the age of 89.

== Records ==
=== Personal bests ===
Distance	Time	Date	Track
500 m	44.80	28 February 1972	(Netherlands) Groningen
1500 m	2:16.50	22 February 1971	(Netherlands) Heerenveen
3000 m	4:51.70	28 February 1972	(Netherlands) Groningen
5000 m	7:52.66	21 February 1976	(Germany) Inzell

=== World records ===
No.	Duration	Distance	Date	Track
1.	World hour record	35 246.82 m*	16 February 1973	(Netherlands) Assen
2.	World hour record	36 971.00 m*	23 February 1976	(Germany) Inzell
3.	24-hour world record skating	608 700 m*	15/16 February 1992	(Italy) Baselga di Piné
4.	24-hour world record skating	651 570 m*	27/28 February 1993	(Italy) Baselga di Piné
5.	24-hour world record skating	655 600 m*	26/27 February 1994	(Italy) Baselga di Piné

*	= unofficial world record

== Marathon speed skating results ==
=== Results in major competitions ===
Year	Dutch Championship artificial ice	Dutch Championship natural ice	Jaap Eden Trophy	KNSB Cup standings	Alternatieve Elfstedentocht	International marathon	Elfstedentocht
1963							out of time
1969							
1970
1971			3rd place, bronze medalist(s)			1st place, gold medalist(s)	
1972	10th		7th			1st place, gold medalist(s)	
1973	4th		7th	3rd place, bronze medalist(s)		2nd place, silver medalist(s)	
1974	9th			9th	1st place, gold medalist(s)		
1975	11th		7th		10th		
1976	12th				(gold) , (bronze)		
1977	5th		5th	16th	1st place, gold medalist(s)		
1978	withdrew			9th			
1979	withdrew	8th	5th		1st place, gold medalist(s)		
1980	14th		13th	10th	1st place, gold medalist(s)		
1981	7th			11th	1st place, gold medalist(s)		
1982	withdrew				1st place, gold medalist(s)		
1983					1st place, gold medalist(s)		
1984	14th				4th, (gold)		
1985		withdrew			6th		12th
1986		withdrew			2nd place, silver medalist(s)		52nd
1987					17th		
1988					27th		
1991					17th		

=== Results in natural-ice classics ===
Jaar	De 100 van Eernewoude	Amstelmeer Marathon	Rottemeren- tocht	Oldambt- rit	Hollands Venetiëtocht	Veluwemeer- tocht	Noordwest- hoekrit
1969	—	—	—	1st place, gold medalist(s)	—	—	—
1970	—	—	—	—	1st place, gold medalist(s)	—	—
1972	—	—	—	—	1st place, gold medalist(s)	—	—
1976	—	—	—	1st place, gold medalist(s)	—	—	—
1978	—	—	—	1st place, gold medalist(s)	—	—	—
1979	—	5th	—	—	—	13th, 6th	—
1980	2nd place, silver medalist(s)	—	—	1st place, gold medalist(s)	—	—	—
1982	—	—	5th	—	—	—	3rd place, bronze medalist(s)
1985	—	—	—	—	3rd place, bronze medalist(s)	—	1st place, gold medalist(s)
1986	25th	—	—	8th	—	—	8th
1987	—	—	—	—	5th	1st place, gold medalist(s)	6th

Source: Profile of Jan Roelof Kruithof at Schaatspeloton.nl
