= Johan Wardenier =

Dutch former speed skater (born 1942)

Personal information
- Born: 10 August 1942 (age 84) Steenwijkerwold, Overijssel, Netherlands
- Years active: 1971–1986

Sport
- Sport: Marathon speed skating
- Events: Marathon and long-distance

Johan Wardenier (born 10 August 1942) is a Dutch former marathon speed skater. He won the KNSB Cup in 1975 and the Alternative Elfstedentocht in Lillehammer, Norway, in 1976. He also held the world one-hour speed skating record for three years (1973–1976).

== Career ==
=== Early years ===
Wardenier grew up in a farming family of eight children in the Noordoostpolder, in an agricultural area that had been reclaimed during the war years. He lived in Marknesse and, during his speed skating career, worked on his father's cattle farm, tending to cows, young stock, and calves.

During Wardenier's teenage years, there were no artificial ice rinks in the Netherlands. He did not start ice skating until the age of twenty. That was during the harsh winter of 1963, when Reinier Paping won the Elfstedentocht. At about the age of thirty, he began competing against the best marathon skaters. He achieved his first major victory on 6 February 1973, when he won the marathon at the IJsselstadion in Deventer, an event counting towards the KNSB Cup (marathon skating), known by its sponsored name, the Heineken Trophy.

On 11 March 1973, Wardenier won an international race over 66 kilometres on a frozen lake in Brandbu/Jaren, Norway. He likewise won the 1972 Dutch artificial-ice marathon skating championship, which was, however, an unofficial championship.

=== World hour record ===
On February 25, 1973, at the Thialf rink in Heerenveen, Wardenier broke Jan Roelof Kruithof's one-hour speed skating world record, which had stood for only nine days. Wardenier skated a distance of 35.3928 kilometres. This was 146 metres farther than Kruithof, who had broken the previous 1968 record with a distance of 35.24682 kilometres at the De Bonte Wever rink in Assen. It was not until two months later that the Royal Dutch Skating Federation (Koninklijke Nederlandsche Schaatsenrijders Bond; KNSB) provided clarity regarding the national recognition of Wardenier's record. Kruithof attempted to reclaim the record on 27 February, but this time he did not succeed at the ice rink in Assen.

Wardenier held the world hour record for three years. On 23 February 1976, at the Inzell ice rink, Kruithof covered a distance of 36.971 kilometres. This record would stand for five years.

=== KNSB Cup ===
On 14 March 1973, Wardenier won the last race of the season counting towards the KNSB Cup at the Jaap Edenbaan in Amsterdam. He finished fourth in the competition's final standings.

In the 1973/1974 season, Wardenier again finished fourth in the overall standings, securing one victory: the marathon in Assen on 17 January 1974. He made his breakthrough in the third season of the KNSB Cup. After winning at the De Meent outdoor rink in Alkmaar on 20 December 1974, he also triumphed at Thialf in Heerenveen on 6 February 1975, and took second place in the overall rankings.

Wardenier reached the podium in each of the next five marathons. He won once, on March 2, 1975, at the Jaap Eden Rink, and finished second twice and third twice. Heading into the final race on 14 March 1975, at De Uithof in The Hague, Wardenier was still second in the overall standings, trailing leader Marten Hoekstra by a narrow margin. During the final race, Hoekstra was suffering from influenza and withdrew from the competition early; Wardenier then needed only a third-place finish to secure the overall victory.

In the following season, hampered by an eye infection, Wardenier could play no significant role. He finished tenth in the final standings in 1976. His eighth-place finish in 1977 was his last time in the top ten.

=== Alternatieve Elfstedentocht ===
The first Alternative Elfstedentocht was held in Lillehammer, Norway, on 2 March 1974. Wardenier finished third in the race, which was won by Jan Roelof Kruithof. A year later, owing to a thaw, the race in Lillehammer on 8 March 1975, had to be shortened to 64 kilometres. Wardenier crossed the finish line in second place, behind winner Hans Brandt.

In 1976 two alternative tours were organized. In the first, on 31 January 1976 in Lahti, Finland, Wardenier had to give up after 150 kilometres, as a few falls had broken his morale. On 6 March 1976, in Lillehammer, Wardenier was the first to cross the finish line. He defeated his fellow breakaway riders Jeen van den Berg, Jan Roelof Kruithof, and Co Giling in the sprint.

Towards the end of Wardenier's career, he competed in the race in Kuopio, Finland, on two more occasions. After finishing eleventh in 1985, he placed fourth in 1986. On both occasions, Theun Busser won the race on Lake Kallavesi.

=== Marathon ===
Wardenier enjoyed his peak period in the mid-1970s. On 2 February 1975, he stood on the top step of the podium at the Jaap Eden Rink. He broke away from a leading group and held his lead all the way to the finish line, thereby winning the fourth edition of the Jaap Eden Trophy. It was his third marathon victory of that season.

At the start of the marathon season in the autumn of 1975, Wardenier was suffering from a viral eye infection. Consequently, he wore ski goggles during the races. He achieved his first victory of the season on 6 January 1976, by winning the "Finn Air Cup" at the Vechtsebanen ice rink in Utrecht.

On 21 February 1978, the Oldambtrit was held in Scheemda, Groningen. Jan Roelof Kruithof won this natural-ice classic just ahead of Wardenier, who crossed the finish line in second place with the same time.

Wardenier also took second place in the inaugural edition of De 100 van Eernewoude, a Frisian marathon on natural ice, on 5 January 1979. In the second edition of this classic, he finished third on 21 January 1980.

Wardenier won the bronze medal at the first Dutch marathon skating championship on natural ice on 18 January 1979. At the Loosdrechtse Plassen, he stood on the podium alongside winner Henk Portengen and runner-up Dries van Wijhe.

He then went without a victory for some time owing to a back injury. The 36-year-old Wardenier got back to winning ways on 21 January 1979, by winning the marathon in Noordwolde, Friesland.

=== Elfstedentocht ===
At the age of 42, Wardenier made his debut in the Elfstedentocht on 21 February 1985. Early in the race, he was among the three leaders. The threesome was caught after the checkpoint in Workum, at the 86-kilometre mark. He eventually crossed the finish line on the Bonkevaart (canal) in 26th place, finishing nearly fourteen minutes behind the winner, Evert van Benthem.

In the next Elfstedentocht, on 26 February 1986, Wardenier was forced to withdraw after just one hour. He suffered frostbite to his eyes owing to the early morning cold. After visiting the first-aid station in Sloten, he gave up.

Shortly after the 1986 Elfstedentocht, the LTC (Landelijke Technische Commissie marathon, or National Technical Committee for Marathon Skating) announced that Kruithof and Wardenier – both now in their forties – would no longer be classified as A-division skaters. From the 1986/1987 winter season onwards, they were required to compete in the veterans' (or "masters") category.

=== World record ===
| No. | Duration | Distance | Date | Track |
|---|---|---|---|---|
| 1. | World hour record | 35 392.80 m* | 25 February 1973 | (Netherlands) Heerenveen |

| * | = Unofficial world record |

== Results ==
=== Results in major competitions ===
| Year | NK artificial ice | NK natural ice | Jaap Eden Trophy | KNSB Cup standings | Alternatieve Elfstedentocht | Elfstedentocht |
|---|---|---|---|---|---|---|
| 1972 | (gold) | | | | | |
| 1973 | 12th | | | 4th | | |
| 1974 | 5th | | | 4th | 3rd place, bronze medalist(s) | |
| 1975 | 10th | | 1st place, gold medalist(s) | 1st place, gold medalist(s) | 2nd place, silver medalist(s) | |
| 1976 | | | | 10th | 1st place, gold medalist(s) | |
| 1977 | 8th | | | 8th | | |
| 1978 | | | | | | |
| 1979 | | 3rd place, bronze medalist(s) | | | | |
| 1980 | | | | | | |
| 1981 | | | | | 7th | |
| 1985 | | withdrew | | | 11th | 26th |
| 1986 | | | | | 4th | withdrew |

=== Results in natural-ice classics ===
| Year | De 100 van Eernewoude |
|---|---|
| 1979 | 2nd place, silver medalist(s) |
| 1980 | 3rd place, bronze medalist(s) |
| 1986 | 8th |

=== Medal table ===
| Championship | 1st place, gold medalist(s) | 2nd place, silver medalist(s) | 3rd place, bronze medalist(s) |
|---|---|---|---|
| NK natuurijs | 0 | 0 | 1 |
| KNSB Cup standings | 1 | 0 | 0 |
| Natuurijsklassiekers | 0 | 1 | 1 |
| Alternative Elfstedentocht | 1 | 1 | 1 |

Source: Profile of Johan Wardenier at Schaatspeloton.nl
