= Adema (disambiguation) =

Adema is an American nu metal band.

Adema or ADEMA may also refer to:

== People ==
=== Surname ===
Adema is a West Frisian patronymic surname. People with this surname include:

- Auke Adema (1907–1976), Dutch speed skater, twice winner of the Elfstedentocht
- es:Gerhardus Jan Adema (1888–1981), Dutch sculptor and painter
- Joost Adema (born 28 September 1959), Dutch rower
- Kees Adema, American philatelist
- Piet Adema (born 1964), Dutch politician
- Wim Hora Adema (1914–1998), Dutch feminist author and publisher

=== Given name ===
- Adema Sangale, Kenyan business woman
- Adema Santa (1930–1984), Brazilian mixed martial artist

== Places ==
- Adema, Portugal, settlement in Samora Correia, Portugal

== Politics ==
- Alliance for Democracy in Mali, Malian political party

== Music ==
- Adema (album), Adema's debut album

== Sports ==
- AS Adema, Malagasy football club

== See also ==
- Edema
