= Jan Uitham =

Dutch speed skater (1925–2019)

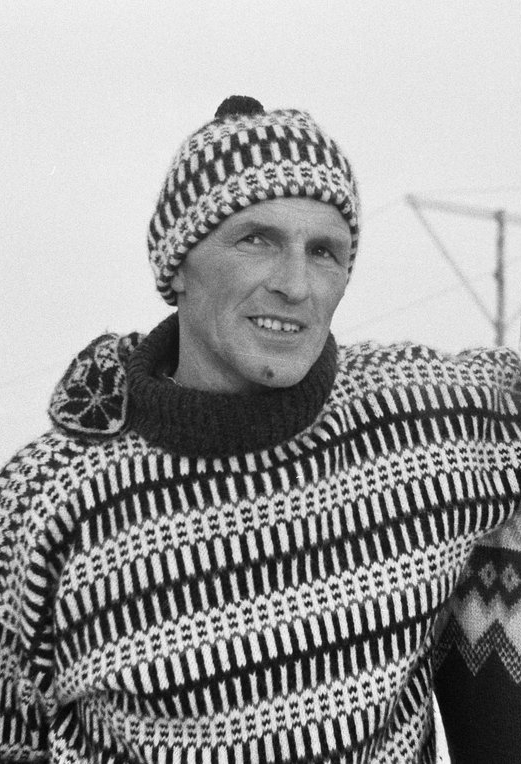
- Jan Uitham (1963)

Personal information
- Nicknames: Kampioen der Verslagenen ("Champion of the Vanquished")
- Born: 2 January 1925 Noorderhoogebrug, Groningen, Netherlands
- Died: 20 April 2019 (aged 94) Ten Boer, Groningen, Netherlands
- Years active: 1942-1997

Sport
- Sport: Speed skating
- Event: Marathon speed skating

Jan Uitham (2 January 1925 – 20 April 2019) was a Dutch speed skater, best known for competing in long-distance races and marathon skating events.

== Speed skating ==
His nickname was Kampioen der Verslagenen ("Champion of the Vanquished"). Contrary to what that name might suggest, he did win an important race: the 1963 Noorder Rondritten. Uitham made his début in the Elfstedentocht in 1942, at the age of 17.

He took part in the Elfstedentocht a total of six times (1942, 1956, 1963, 1985, 1986, and 1997). His best result came during the gruelling 1963 "Tour of Tours": he finished second, behind Reinier Paping but ahead of the heavy favourites Jeen van den Berg and Anton Verhoeven. In 1956, he had to drop out owing to an injury. His participation that same year was a disheartening experience: he completed the whole course, but arrived just too late to qualify for a commemorative medal. During that same period, he also skated the Noorderrondrit eight times (in 1941, 1942, 1954, 1961, 1963 – when he won – 1985 – placing 3rd – 1986, and 1987). That first-place finish earned him a commemorative plaque in Winsum in 2013, 50 years after his victory.

He ended his skating career at the age of 62. After his skating career, he stayed on his farm in Noorderhoogebrug.

== Outside speed skating ==
After the Second World War ended, Uitham was called up for military service and sent to Surabaya in East Java. There, during the Indonesian War of Independence, he was assigned to the radio communications unit. Subsequently, Uitham was involved in the annual commemoration of the Dutch East Indies held in the city of Groningen.

In both the provincial council elections for the province of Groningen and the municipal council elections for the municipality of Groningen, he served several times as a lijstduwer for the local parties De Groningers and the Partij voor het Noorden. The last such instance occurred shortly before his death at the age of 94 on 20 April 2019, during the provincial council elections being held that year.

== Tributes ==
In 1990, he was honoured for all his skating achievements at the IJsbaan Stadspark (rink). In June 2009, during the presentation of the book Jan Uitham – Tjonge, wat een kerel ("Jan Uitham – Boy, what a guy"), Uitham was presented with a royal decoration by the then-mayor, Jacques Wallage (of the Labour Party), and was appointed a Member of the Order of Orange-Nassau. That same year, he cycled up the Alpe d'Huez. He was 84 years old at the time. At the time of his death, he was an honorary member of the Groningen Ice Skating Association (IJsvereniging Groningen), having served there as an athlete, coach, and mentor. Furthermore, he was an honorary member of the Royal Dutch Skating Federation's (Koninklijke Nederlandsche Schaatsenrijders Bond; KNSB) Groningen regional branch.

Arriva has named one of its trains after him — specifically, train 10228.

== Personal life and death ==
He was the son of telephone operator Geertje Roberts and farmer Jan Uitham. He himself was married to Alida Berendina (Lidy) Nienhuis. Uitham was uncle to former mayor of Groningen Peter Rehwinkel. His great-granddaughter, Aveline Hijlkema, is also a long-track speed skater.

Uitham died on 20 April 2019 at the age of 94.
