= Willem Wijk =

Dutch politician (1864–1941)

- Willem Wijk in 1927

Member of the House of Representatives
- In office 17 September 1918 – 24 June 1922

Personal details
- Born: 17 September 1864 Noorderhoogebrug, Netherlands
- Died: 24 January 1941 (aged 76) Amersfoort, Netherlands
- Party: Alliance to Democratise the Forces (1918–1922)
- Spouse: Johanna Maria van der Pol

Willem Wijk (17 September 1864 – 24 January 1941) was a Dutch non-commissioned officer and politician. From 1918 to 1922, he was a member of the Dutch House of Representatives for the Alliance to Democratise the Forces (Verbond tot Democratisering der Weermacht, VDW), a minor political party seeking to advance the rights of NCOs within the Royal Netherlands Army.

== Biography ==
Willem Wijk was born on 17 September 1864 in the village of Noorderhoogebrug in the province of Groningen to Klaas Wilhelmus Wijk, a grain miller, and Jantje van Hemmen. After finishing primary school, Wijk eventually became a non-commissioned officer in the Royal Netherlands Army, and joined the Association of Non-commissioned Officers "Our Interest" (Vereniging voor Onderofficieren "Ons Belang"). The association opposed what it viewed as the subordinate position of non-commissioned officers in the Dutch army. From 1902 to 1913, Wijk was a member of that group's executive, and he became its chairperson in 1915.

In 1918, the association formed its own political party, the Alliance to Democratise the Forces (Verbond tot Democratisering der Weermacht, VDW), with the main goal of achieving more egalitarian relations within the Dutch army and reforming it into a "people's army." When the VDW managed to gain a seat in the 1918 Dutch general election, Willem Wijk became its representative in the House of Representatives. From 1918 to 1921, Wijk was part of the Neutral Faction, led by Willem Treub of the Economic League, alongside three other minor interest group parties; the Neutral Party, Peasants' League, and the Middle Class Party.

As an MP, Wijk spoke exclusively on military affairs. In 1919, he managed to pass legislation equalizing the treatment of widows and orphans of soldiers with that of those of other government personnel. In 1920, he submitted a motion proposing the abolition of the Dutch military with the intention of forcing the Social Democratic Workers' Party (SDAP) to vote in favour of it, and Wijk himself ultimately voted against it. In December 1921, his vote was crucial in allowing a proposed conscription law of minister Jannes van Dijk to pass through the House of Representatives.

The VDM, as with most small interest group parties in this period, was a generally isolated force within the House, and Wijk himself was viewed as "an unwanted force" by the large established political parties. After three years in office, Wijk concluded at a party meeting that "the party interests of large groups make it impossible for single representatives of group interests to achieve anything of importance." In 1922, the VDM decided not to participate in that year's general election and disbanded.

Wijk remained active in the Association "Our Interest", helping found many institutions associated with the organisation in Amersfoort. Willem Wijk was a knight in the Order of Orange-Nassau and the Belgian Order of the Crown. He was married to Johanna Maria van der Pol.

Willem Wijk died on 24 January 1941 in Amersfoort.

== Bibliography ==
- Blom, R.L.; Stelling, Th. (2004). Niet voor God en niet voor het Vaderland. Linkse soldaten, matrozen en hun organisaties tijdens de mobilisatie van '14-'18 (PDF) (in Dutch). Uitgeverij Aspekt.
- Vossen, Koen (2003). Vrij vissen in het Vondelpark: kleine politieke partijen in Nederland 1918 - 1940. Amsterdam: Wereldbibliotheek. ISBN 978-90-284-2009-0.
