= Havelter Molen, Havelte =

Windmill in Havelte, Netherlands

Havelter Molen
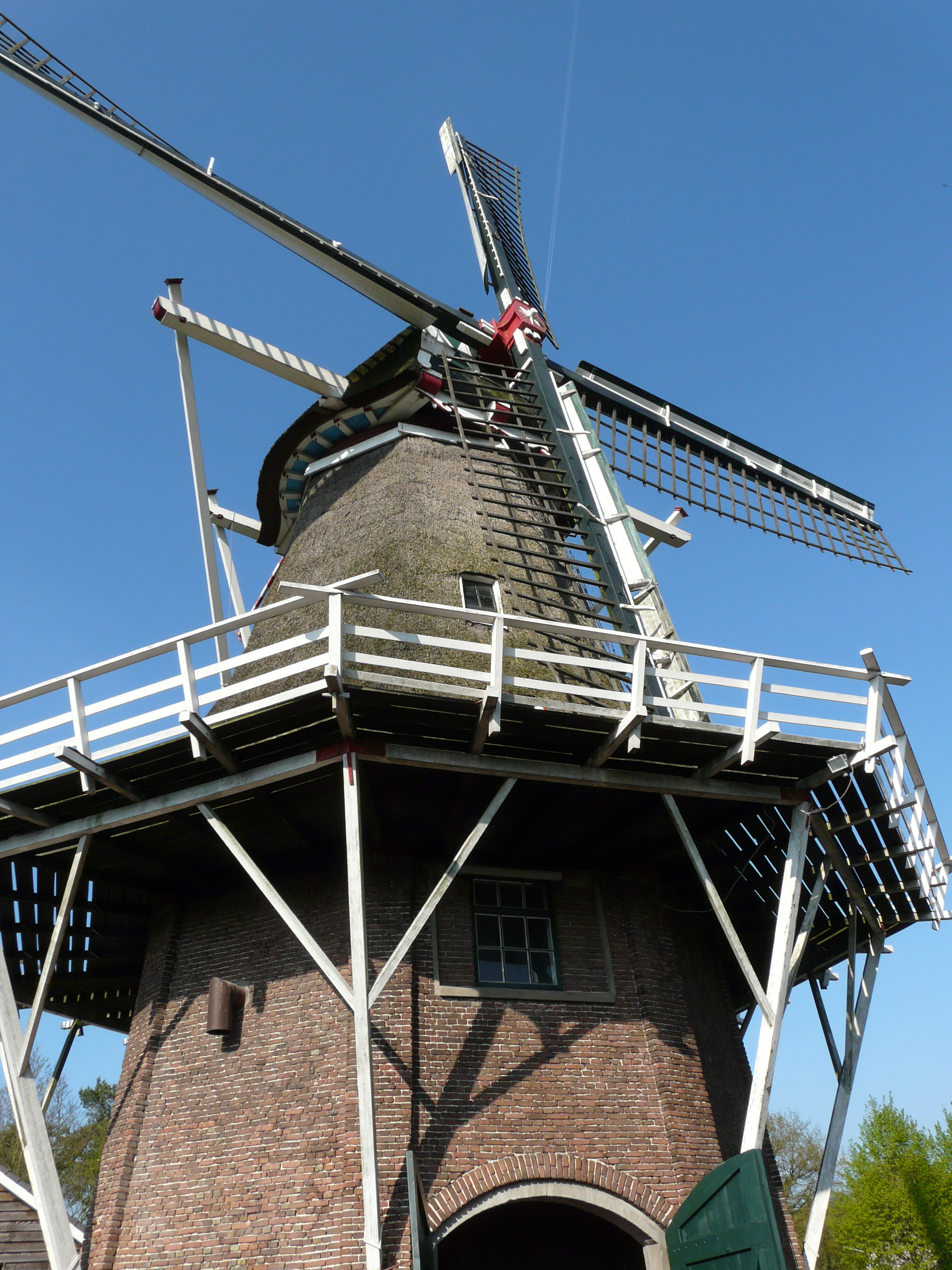
- Havelter Molen, April 2009
- Interactive map of Havelter Molen

Origin
- Mill location: Molenweg 29, 7971 BJ, Havelte
- Coordinates: 52°46′35″N 6°14′09″E
- Operator: Stichting De Havelter Molen
- Year built: 191430

Information
- Purpose: Corn mill
- Type: Smock mill
- Storeys: Two-storey smock
- Base storeys: Three-storey base
- Smock sides: Eight sides
- No. of sails: Four sails
- Type of sails: Common sails
- Windshaft: Cast iron
- Winding: Tailpole and winch
- No. of pairs of millstones: One pair
- Size of millstones: 1.40 metres (4 ft 7 in)

The Havelter Molen is a smock mill at Havelte, Drenthe, the Netherlands which was built in 1914 and has been restored to working order. The mill is listed as a Rijksmonument, number 21029.

== History ==
A smock mill on this site was standing in 1873. It was originally built as a "grondzeiler" (a mill without a stage whose sails reach almost down to the ground). In that year, the mill was raised on a brick base. The owner at the time was Lucas van de Wetering. In 1906, the mill came into the possession of Berend Hendrik van der Vegt. On 20 March 1914, the mill was struck by lightning and burnt down, leaving the base standing.

To replace it, a windmill was moved from Wapse by millwright De Graaf of Zwolle, Overijssel. It was placed on the surviving base of the earlier mill. The mill was worked by wind until c1950. In 1951, new owner G van der Poll installed a hammer mill in the mill. The mill was restored in 1956-57 and again in 1976, when the cap was removed for repair. The cap was replaced on 21 December 1976. The mill was rethatched in July 2009.

== Description ==
The Havelter Molen is what the Dutch describe as an "achtkante stellingmolen". It is a two-storey smock mill on a three-storey brick base. There is a stage at second-floor level, 6.40 metres (21 ft 0 in) above ground level. The smock and cap are thatched. The four Common sails have a span of 19.40 metres (63 ft 8 in). They have streamlined leading edges on the Fok system. The sails are carried in a cast-iron windshaft which was cast by Fabrikaat Prins van Oranje of The Hague in 1868. The windshaft also carries the brake wheel which has 73 cogs. The brake wheel drives the wallower (33 cogs) at the top of the upright shaft. At the bottom of the upright shaft, the great spur wheel, which has 104 cogs drives the 1.40 metres (4 ft 7 in) diameter French Burr millstones via a lantern pinion stone nut which has 33 staves.

== Public access ==
The Havelter Molen is open to the public on Saturdays from 13:00 to 16:30 and at other times by appointment.
