= Reinier Paping =

Dutch speedskater (1931–2021)

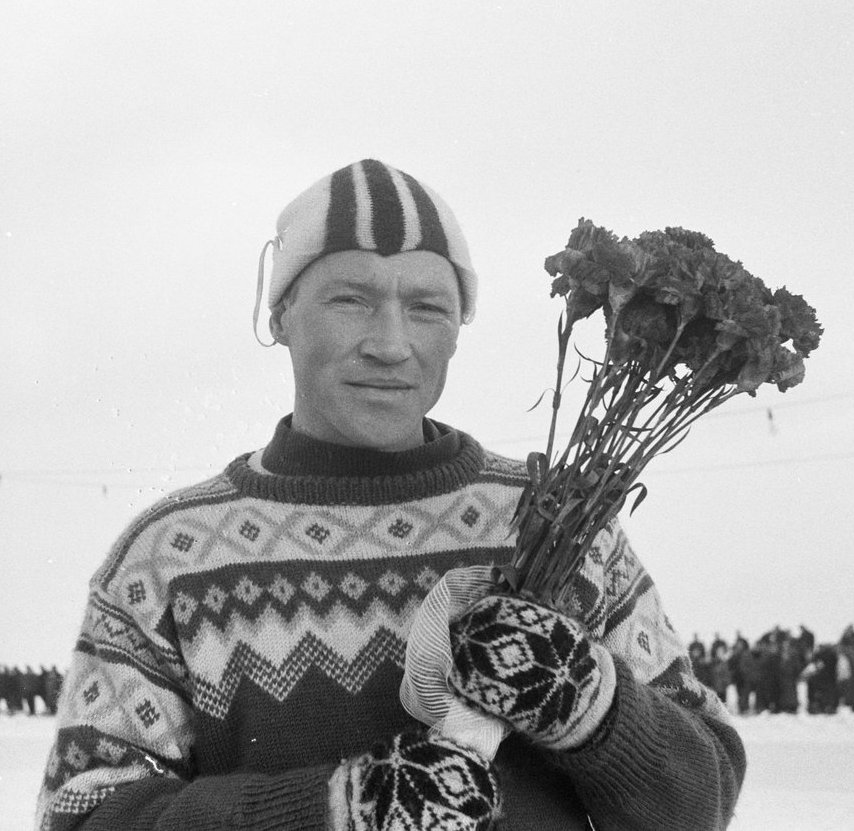
- Paping in 1963
- Born: 18 February 1931; Dedemsvaart, Netherlands
- Died: 20 December 2021 (aged 90)
- Occupation: speedskater
- Known for: 1963 winner, Elfstedentocht

Reinier Paping (18 February 1931 – 20 December 2021) was a Dutch speedskater primarily known as the winner of the Elfstedentocht of 1963. This Elfstedentocht became known as "The hell of '63" when only 69 of the 9,292 contestants were able to finish the race, due to the extremely low temperatures, dipping to −18 °C, and a harsh eastern wind. After winning the race, he was recognized as a national hero in the Netherlands.

== Early life and career ==
Paping was born in Dedemsvaart on 18 February 1931. Before 1963, Paping had participated in several Dutch allround championships, with a 4th place in 1955 as his best result.

=== The 1963 Elfstedentocht ===
Halfway through the harsh Elfstedentocht of 18 January 1963, Paping skated away from a leading group with Jeen van den Berg, Anton Verhoeven, and Jan Uitham, and travelled the rest of the trip alone. Paping finished the race in ten hours and 59 minutes, while the second-place finisher, Jan Uitham, arrived a full 22 minutes later. Because of the conditions—which included colds of −18 °C—his solo escape, and the fact that the next Elfstedentocht was not held until 22 years later, Paping became a national hero and the tour itself legendary.

== Death ==
Paping died on 20 December 2021, at age 90.

Year	Date	Temperature	Winner (*)		Time	Distance	Average speed
1909	2 January	n/a	Minne Hoekstra		13:50	189 km	13.7 km/h
1912	7 February	3.8°C	Coen de Koning		11:40	189 km	16.2 km/h
1917	27 January	-1.8°C	Coen de Koning		9:53	189 km	19.1 km/h
1929	12 February	-10.1°C	Karst Leemburg		11:09	191 km	17.1 km/h
1933	16 December	-2.0°C	Abe de Vries; Sipke Castelein		9:53	195 km	19.7 km/h
1940	30 January	-6.1°C	Piet Keijzer; Auke Adema; Cor Jongert; Durk van der Duim; Sjouke Westra		11:34	198.5 km	17.3 km/h
1941	7 February	0.0°C	Auke Adema		9:19	198.5 km	21.3 km/h
1942	22 January	-11.7°C	Sietze de Groot		8:44	198 km	22.7 km/h
1947	8 February	-8.5°C	Jan W. van der Hoorn		10:51	191 km	17.6 km/h
1954	3 February	-5.4°C	Jeen van den Berg		7:35	198.5 km	26.2 km/h
1956	14 February	-4.9°C	no winner declared (**)		—	190.5 km	—
1963	18 January	-7.7°C	Reinier Paping		10:59	196.5 km	17.9 km/h
			Winner men	Winner women (*)			
1985	21 February	0.3°C	Evert van Benthem	Lenie van der Hoorn	6:47	196.8 km	29.0 km/h
1986	26 February	-6.9°C	Evert van Benthem	Tineke Dijkshoorn	6:55	199.3 km	28.8 km/h
1997	4 January	-3.6°C	Henk Angenent	Klasina Seinstra	6:49	199.6 km	29.3 km/h
"History" (in Dutch). Vereniging De Friesche Elf Steden [Association of the Eleven Fries Cities].; * Women were first allowed to take part in the tour proper in 1985; before then they had to skate with the amateurs and no award was given. ** After shared wins in 1933 and 1940, when the front-runners decided not to compete but join hands to cross the line together, this practice was forbidden by the organisation. Jan van der Hoorn, Aad de Koning, Jeen Nauta, Maus Wijnhout and Anton Verhoeven however ignored this rule when they crossed the finish line in unison. They were not disqualified, but no winner was declared.: "3,000 Skaters in 124-mile race". The Times. No. 48527. London. 31 January 1940. col. B, p. 7.
