= Ouwsterhaule =

Ouwsterhaule Ousterhaule
- Village
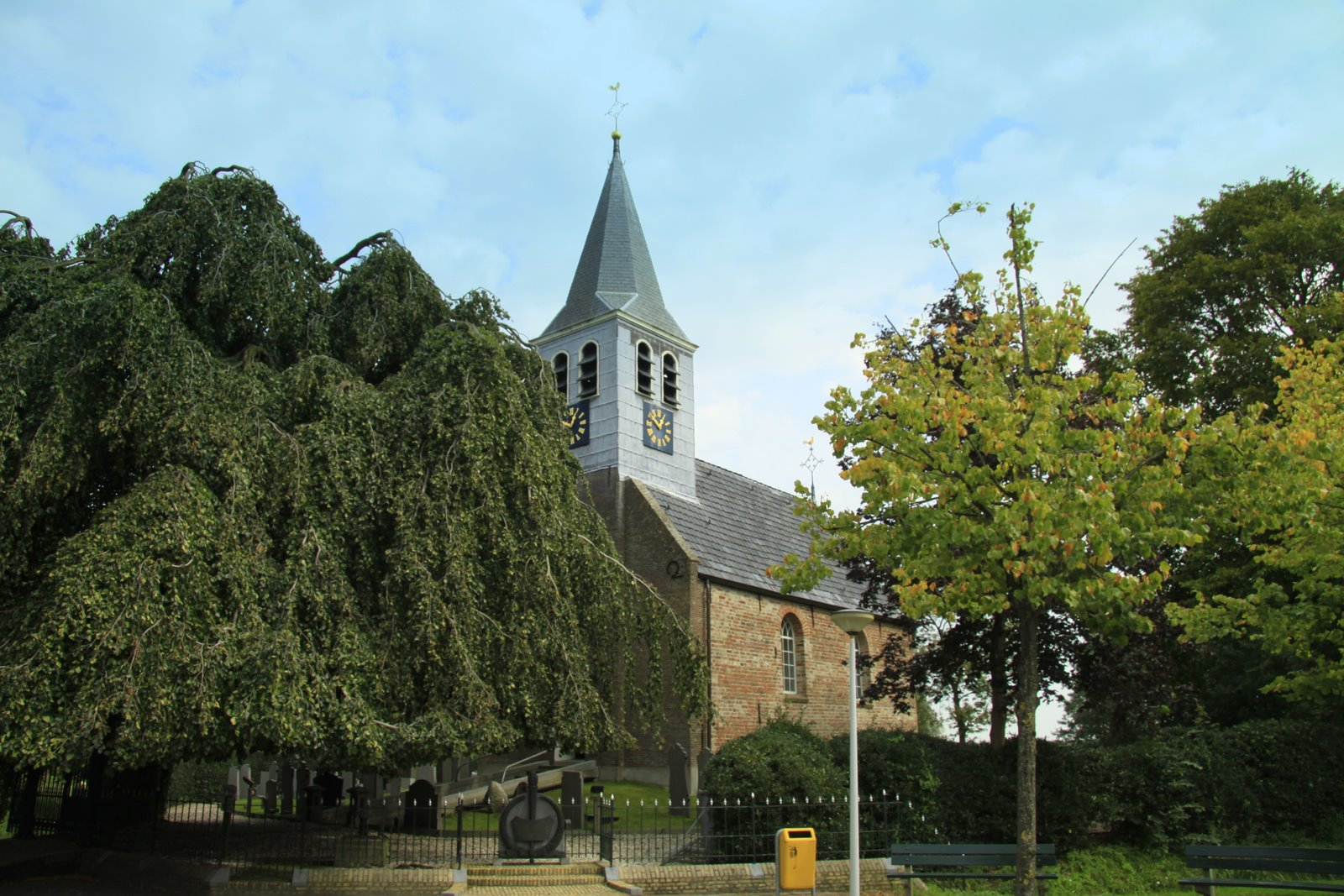
- Ouwsterhaule church

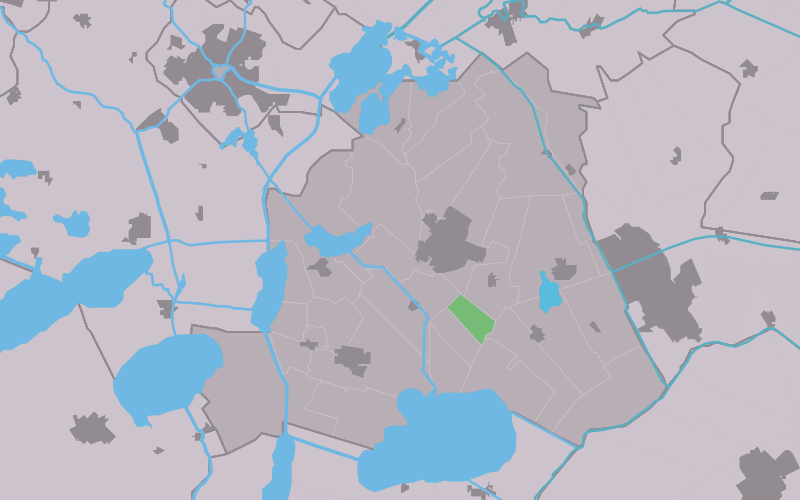
- Location in the former Skarsterlân municipality

- Location in the Netherlands Ouwsterhaule (Netherlands)
- Country: Netherlands
- Province: Friesland
- Municipality: De Fryske Marren

Area
  - Total: 2.03 km^{2} (0.78 sq mi)
- Elevation: −0.7 m (−2.3 ft)

Population (2021)
  - Total: 85
  - Density: 42/km^{2} (110/sq mi)
- Time zone: UTC+1 (CET)
  - Summer (DST): UTC+2 (CEST)
- Postal code: 8513
- Dialing code: 0513

Ouwsterhaule (West Frisian: Ousterhaule) is a village in De Fryske Marren municipality in the province of Friesland, the Netherlands. It had a population of around 355 in 2017.

== History ==
The village was first mentioned in the 13th century as Haula. Ouwster is a reference to the Ouwer region. The etymology of haule is unclear. There used to be three churches in the Ouwer region. In 1730, the church of Ouwsterhaule was the only one remaining due to the construction of roads. The church has 14th century elements. In 1840, it was home to 82 people. There is a public transport museum in the village with buses, a rail transport modelling and wooden trains sets for the children.

Before 2014, Ouwsterhaule was part of the Skarsterlân municipality and before 1984 it was part of Doniawerstal.

Ouwsterhaule was Dutch marathon speed skater Jan Roelof Kruithof's (1936–2026) birthplace.

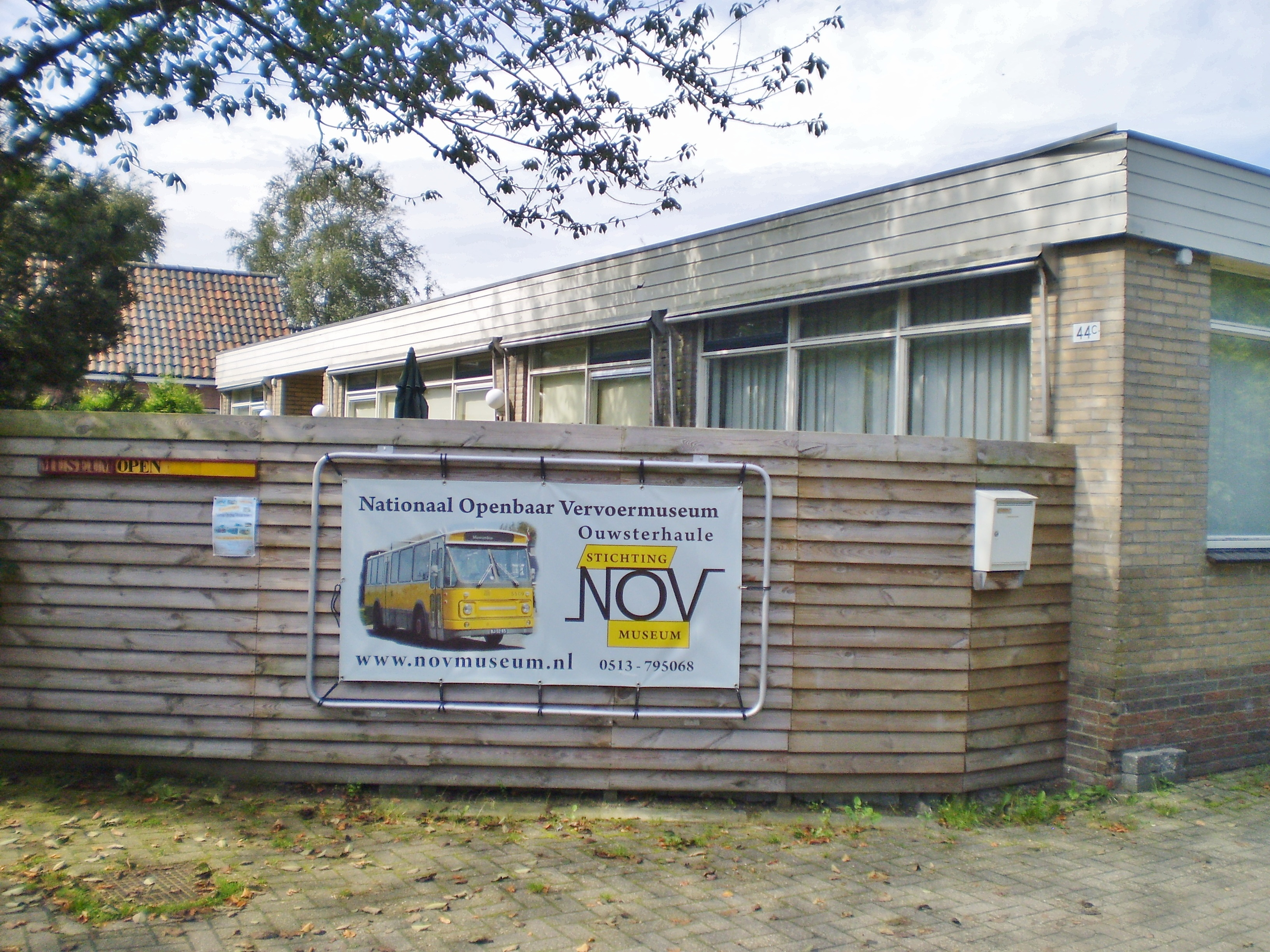
Public transport museum
