= Marknesse =

- Village
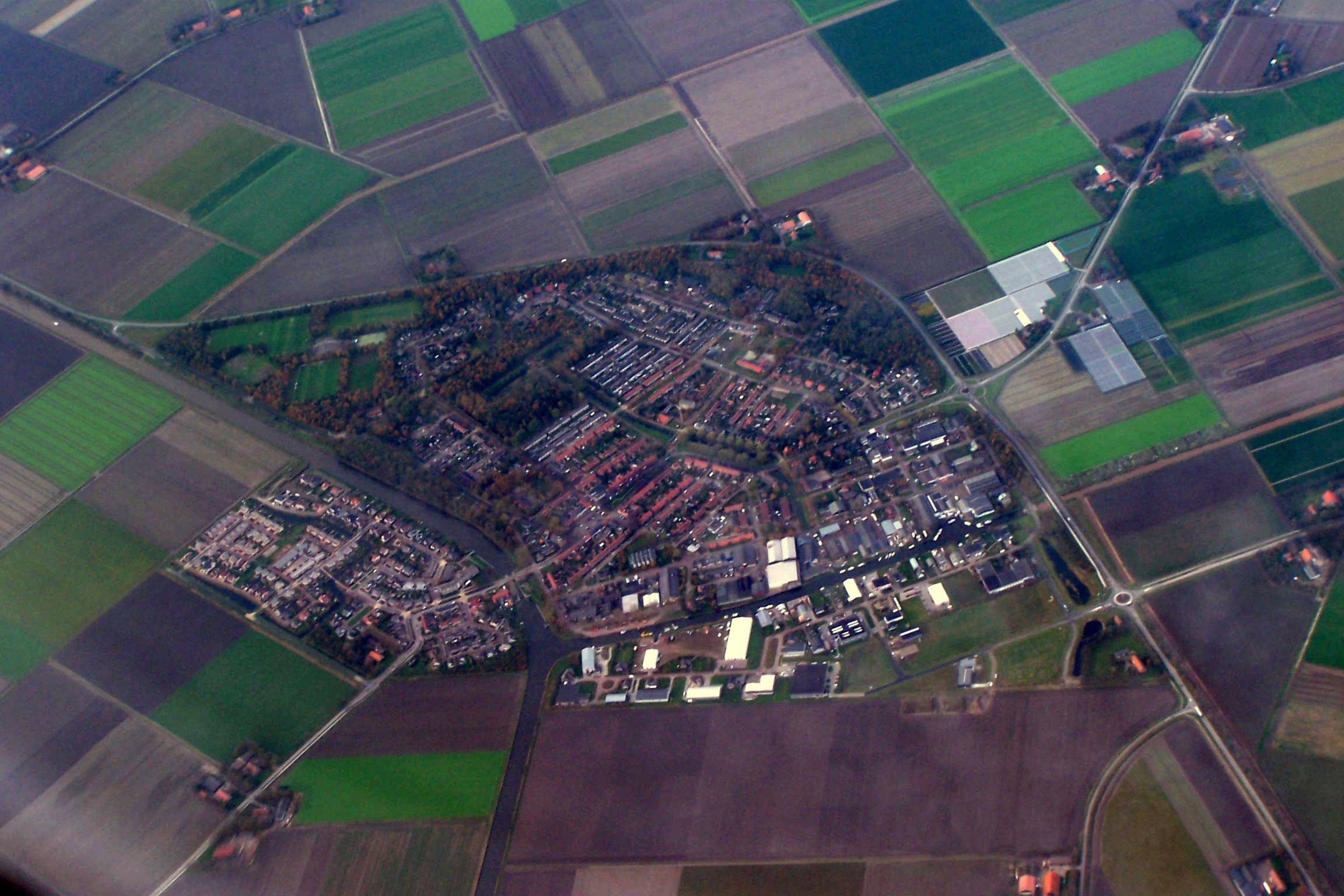
- Marknesse from above

- Flag Coat of arms

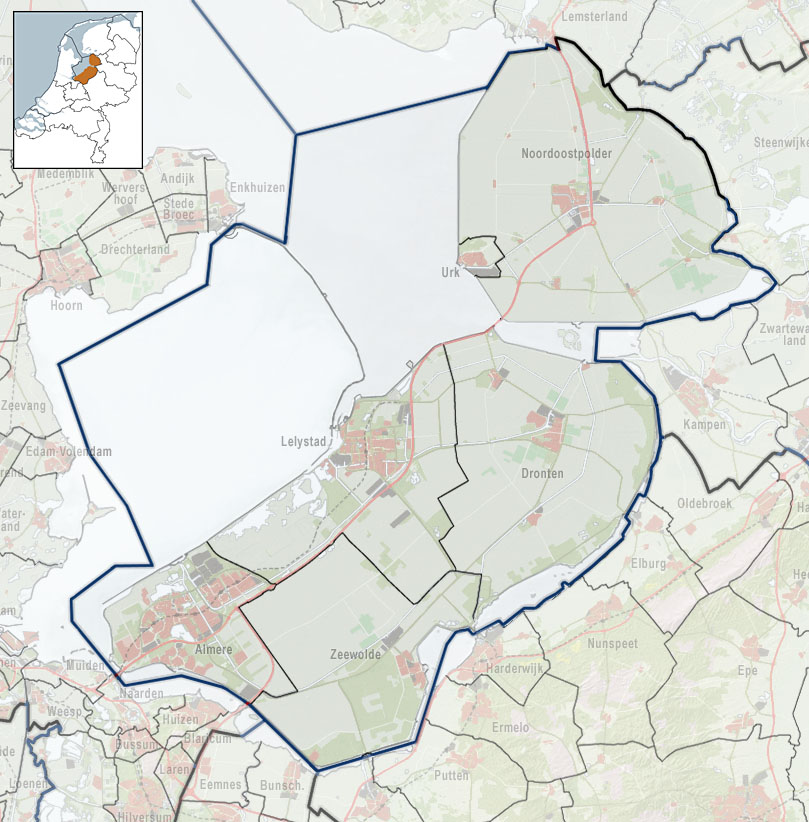
- Location of Marknesse in the province of Flevoland Marknesse (Netherlands)
- Coordinates: 52°42′32″N 5°51′44″E
- Country: Netherlands
- Province: Flevoland
- Municipality: Noordoostpolder
- Established: 1946

Area
  - Total: 53.82 km^{2} (20.78 sq mi)
- Elevation: −2.8 m (−9.2 ft)

Population (2021)
  - Total: 3,775
  - Density: 70.14/km^{2} (181.7/sq mi)
- Time zone: UTC+1 (CET)
  - Summer (DST): UTC+2 (CEST)
- Postal code: 8316
- Dialing code: 0527
- Website: www.marknesse.nl

Marknesse is a village in the Dutch province of Flevoland. It is a part of the municipality of Noordoostpolder, and lies about 7.5 kilometres (4.7 mi) east of Emmeloord.

== History ==
Marknesse was first mentioned in 1950 as Marknesse, and is a combination of border land and headland. It has been named after a flooded village near Urk.

The village was founded in 1946 as B. In 1943, temporary barracks were built to polder the Noordoostpolder. The plan of the village by Theo Verlaan was approved in 1949. The village has a green central axis with the Dutch Reformed Church in one corner and the Reformed Church on the other side, and the flanks contain shops. Most of the houses are oriented north–south.

After the merger of the two Reformed Churches into the Protestant Church, it was decided to demolish the Dutch Reformed church and replace it with a five-story apartment building. One of the original wooden barracks is still present. It was supposed to be transformed into residential houses, but is currently in use as a cultural centre.

== Gallery ==
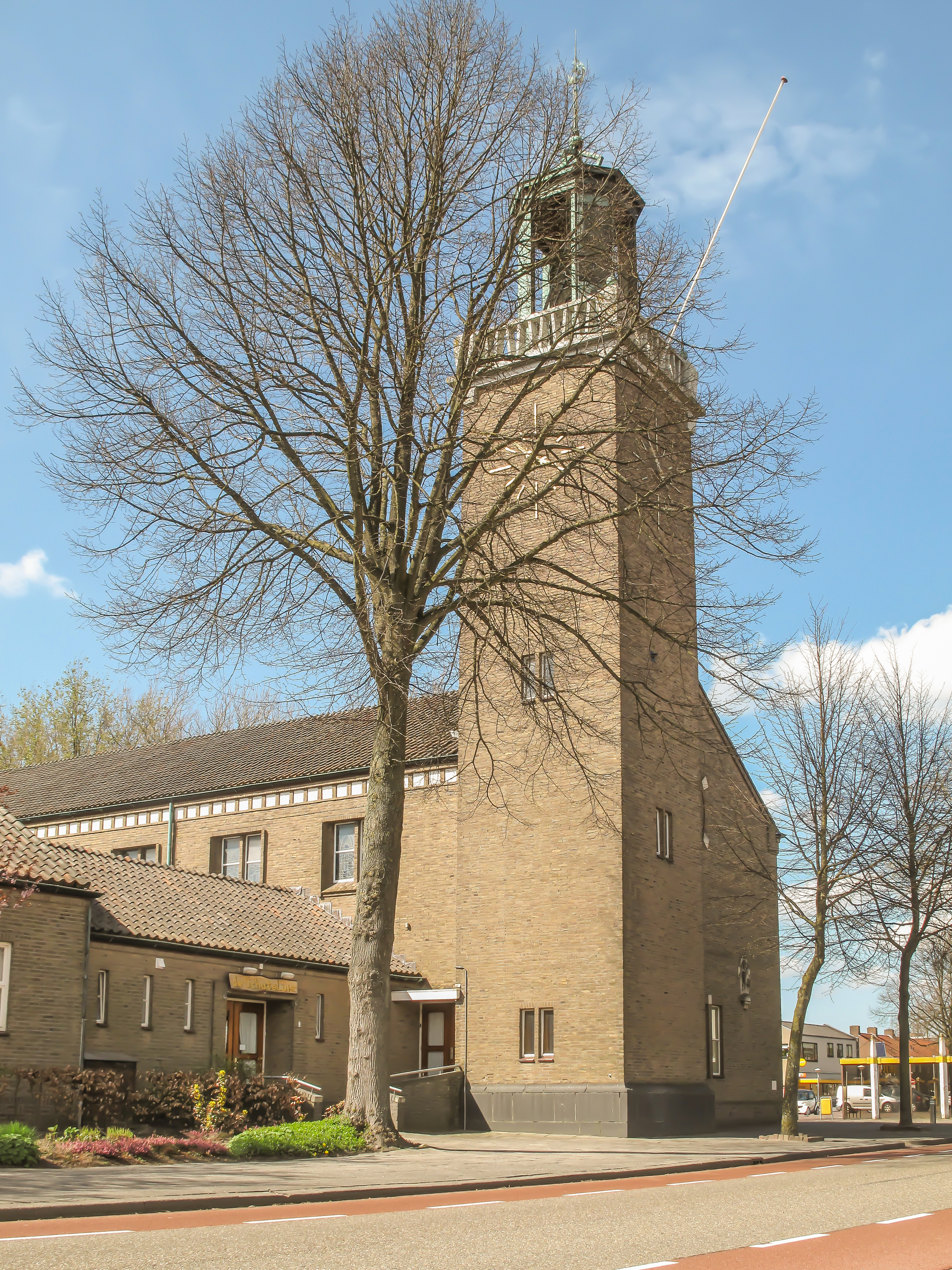
Marknesse, reformed church

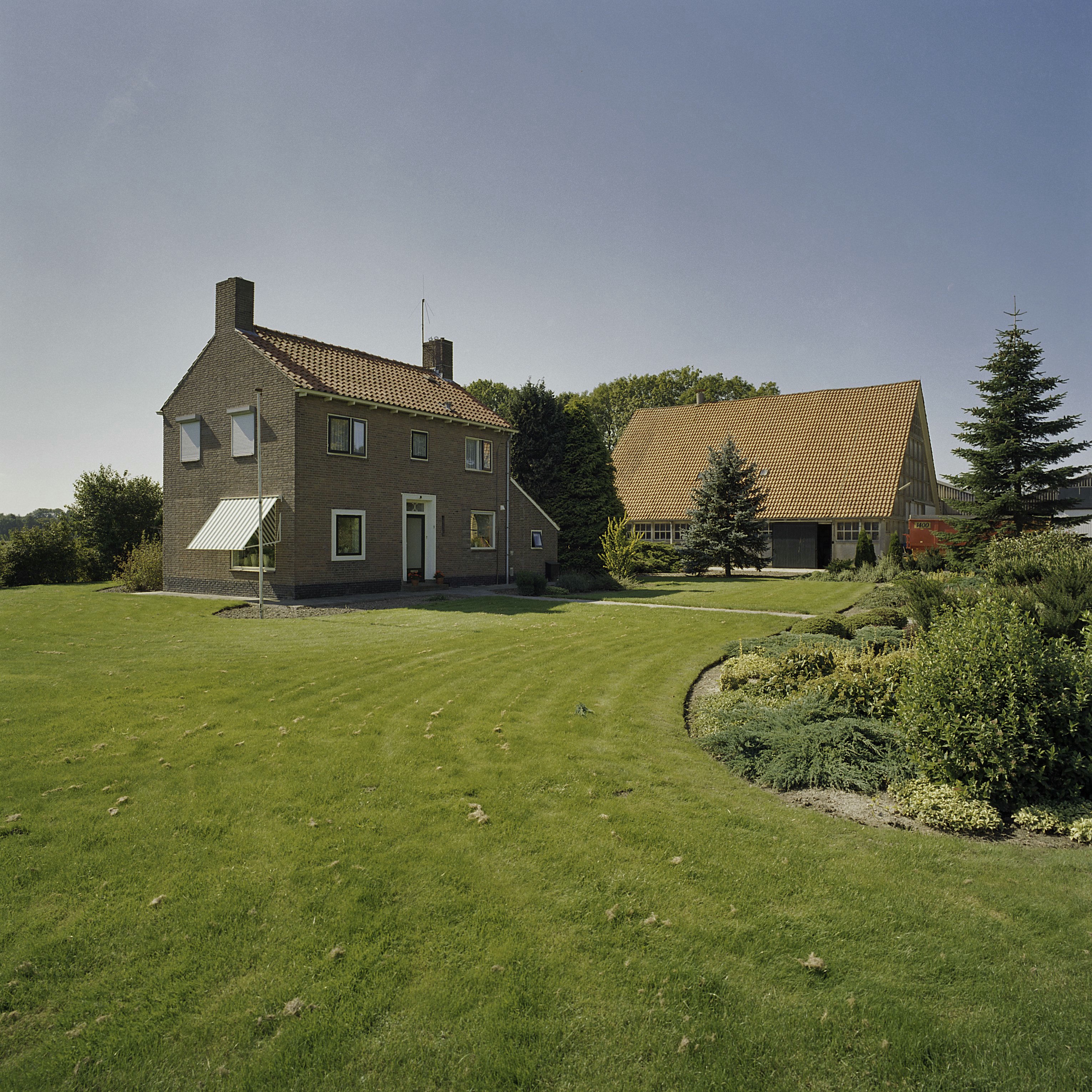
Farm in Marknesse

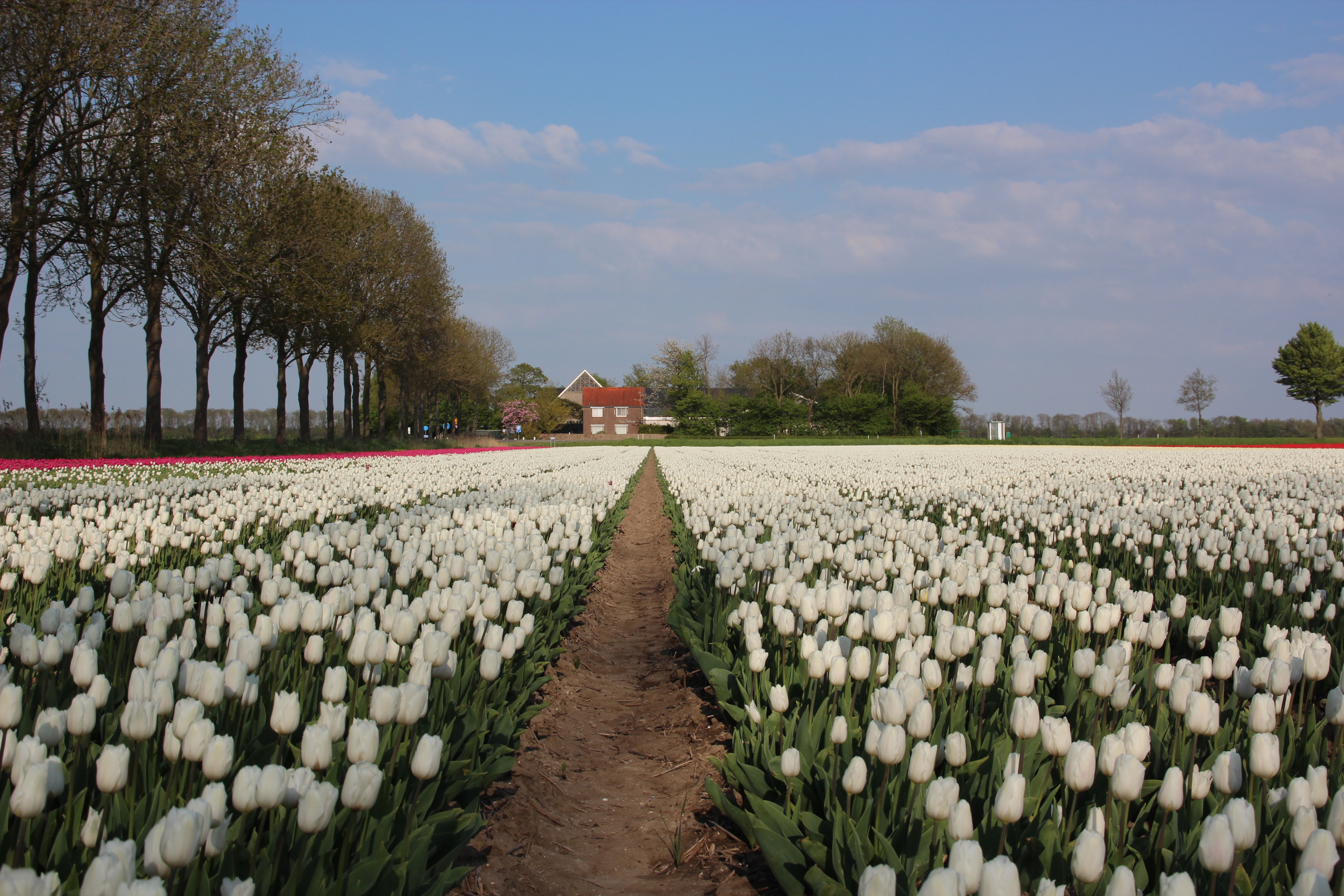
Field of flowers

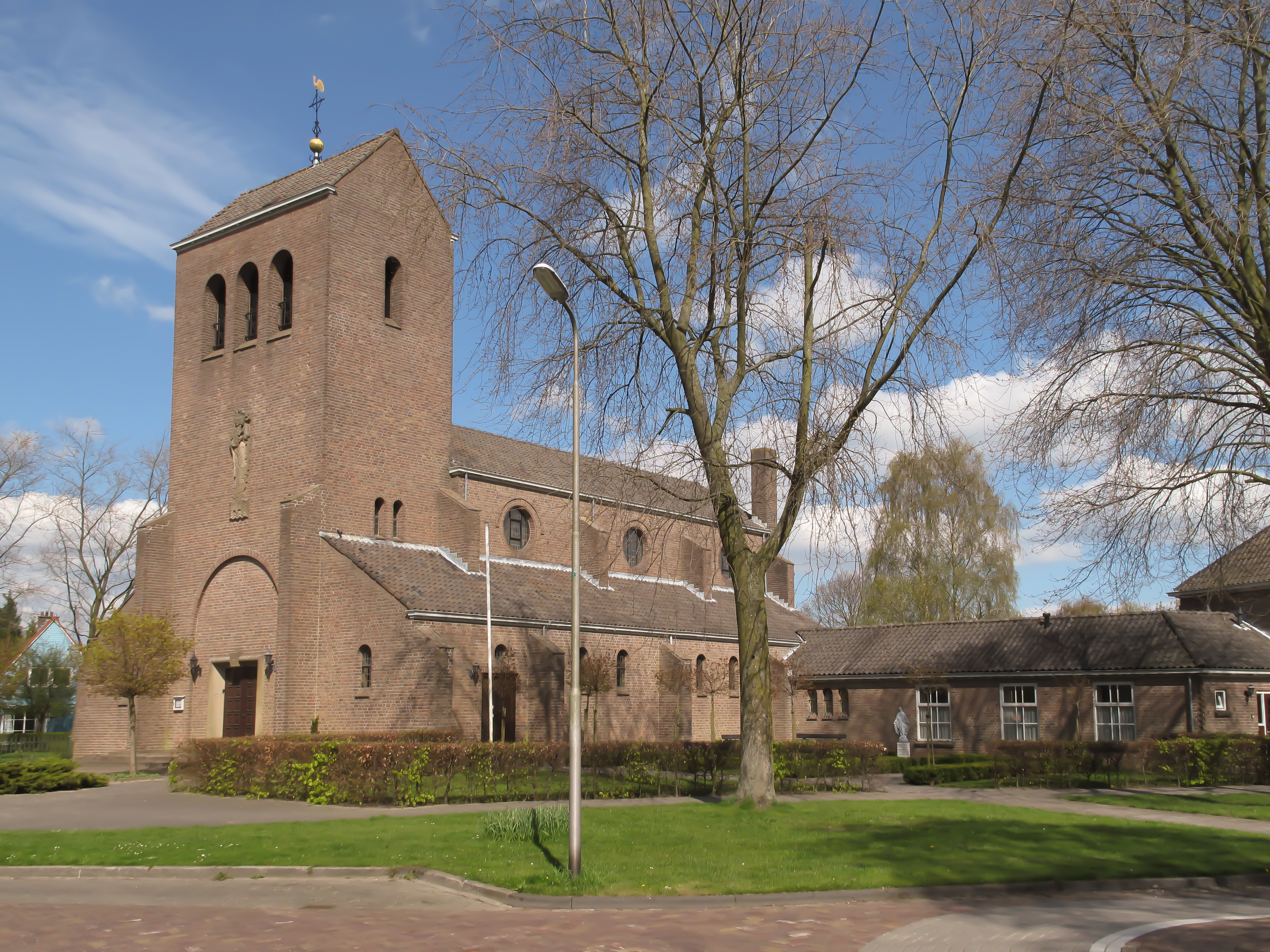
Catholic church

== Climate ==
Climate data for Marknesse (1991−2020 normals, extremes 1989−present)
Month	Jan	Feb	Mar	Apr	May	Jun	Jul	Aug	Sep	Oct	Nov	Dec	Year
Record high °C (°F)	14.5 (58.1)	17.6 (63.7)	23.4 (74.1)	28.5 (83.3)	31.3 (88.3)	33.7 (92.7)	38.1 (100.6)	34.7 (94.5)	31.2 (88.2)	25.5 (77.9)	19.1 (66.4)	14.3 (57.7)	38.1 (100.6)
Mean daily maximum °C (°F)	5.3 (41.5)	6.1 (43.0)	9.6 (49.3)	14.3 (57.7)	17.9 (64.2)	20.2 (68.4)	22.4 (72.3)	22.4 (72.3)	18.9 (66.0)	14.2 (57.6)	9.2 (48.6)	6.0 (42.8)	13.9 (57.0)
Daily mean °C (°F)	3.1 (37.6)	3.4 (38.1)	5.9 (42.6)	9.5 (49.1)	13.1 (55.6)	15.6 (60.1)	17.7 (63.9)	17.5 (63.5)	14.4 (57.9)	10.5 (50.9)	6.6 (43.9)	3.8 (38.8)	10.1 (50.2)
Mean daily minimum °C (°F)	0.8 (33.4)	0.7 (33.3)	2.4 (36.3)	4.6 (40.3)	8.2 (46.8)	10.7 (51.3)	12.7 (54.9)	12.6 (54.7)	10.1 (50.2)	6.8 (44.2)	3.9 (39.0)	1.5 (34.7)	6.2 (43.2)
Record low °C (°F)	−16.7 (1.9)	−22.8 (−9.0)	−20.7 (−5.3)	−6.0 (21.2)	−0.5 (31.1)	1.7 (35.1)	5.0 (41.0)	5.4 (41.7)	2.3 (36.1)	−5.3 (22.5)	−8.4 (16.9)	−13.0 (8.6)	−22.8 (−9.0)
Average precipitation mm (inches)	66.8 (2.63)	55.1 (2.17)	49.9 (1.96)	41.2 (1.62)	58.2 (2.29)	77.1 (3.04)	87.0 (3.43)	85.8 (3.38)	71.7 (2.82)	73.2 (2.88)	66.9 (2.63)	71.9 (2.83)	804.8 (31.69)
Average precipitation days (≥ 1.0 mm)	12.2	10.5	9.8	7.8	9.5	10.2	11.7	11.1	10.3	11.6	12.3	13.0	130.0
Average relative humidity (%)	90.0	87.5	83.4	77.0	75.6	79.2	80.2	81.0	85.0	88.4	91.4	91.3	84.2
Mean monthly sunshine hours	68.8	97.0	149.0	200.2	226.5	214.2	224.6	205.4	159.9	121.8	70.0	60.6	1,798
Percentage possible sunshine	26.9	34.7	40.4	47.9	46.4	42.6	44.4	45.0	41.9	36.8	26.5	25.3	38.2
Source: Royal Netherlands Meteorological Institute

== Notable people ==
- Johan Hansma, (born 1969), Dutch former professional footballer
- Robin Veldman, (born 1985), Dutch football manager
- Johan Wardenier, (born 1942), Dutch former speed skater
