= Auke Adema =

Dutch speed skater

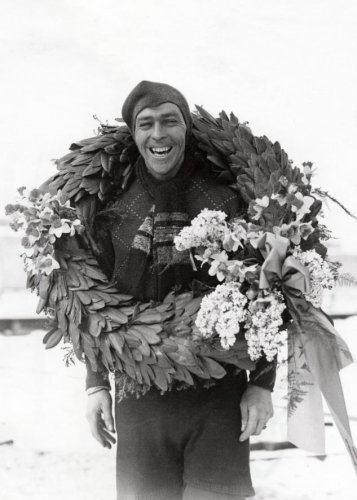
- Adema in 1941

Personal information
- Born: 4 October 1907 Franeker, Netherlands
- Died: 31 March 1976 Berlikum, Netherlands

Sport
- Country: Netherlands
- Sport: Speed skating

Achievements and titles
- Personal best(s): 1940 Elfstedentocht; 1941 Elfstedentocht

Auke Adema (4 October 1907 – 31 March 1976) was a Dutch skater. He won the Elfstedentocht, the world's largest speed skating competition twice. In the sixth race in 1940 he controversially shared the victory with Durk van der Duim, Cor Jongert, Piet Keijzer and Sjouke Westra. In Dokkum they had made a conspiracy to cross the finish line together. This became known as the Pact of Dokkum. The practice of non competitive finishing was outlawed after this. Adema won the seventh Elfstedentocht by himself on 6 February 1941 in a time of 9 hours 19 minutes, a race record. In the race he broke away from the pack with two others to have an early lead. However, when stopping to eat a sausage with Joop Bosman at Workum, other skaters managed to get ahead, but Adema overtook and won by three minutes over Bosman.

Year	Date	Temperature	Winner (*)		Time	Distance	Average speed
1909	2 January	n/a	Minne Hoekstra		13:50	189 km	13.7 km/h
1912	7 February	3.8°C	Coen de Koning		11:40	189 km	16.2 km/h
1917	27 January	-1.8°C	Coen de Koning		9:53	189 km	19.1 km/h
1929	12 February	-10.1°C	Karst Leemburg		11:09	191 km	17.1 km/h
1933	16 December	-2.0°C	Abe de Vries; Sipke Castelein		9:53	195 km	19.7 km/h
1940	30 January	-6.1°C	Piet Keijzer; Auke Adema; Cor Jongert; Durk van der Duim; Sjouke Westra		11:34	198.5 km	17.3 km/h
1941	7 February	0.0°C	Auke Adema		9:19	198.5 km	21.3 km/h
1942	22 January	-11.7°C	Sietze de Groot		8:44	198 km	22.7 km/h
1947	8 February	-8.5°C	Jan W. van der Hoorn		10:51	191 km	17.6 km/h
1954	3 February	-5.4°C	Jeen van den Berg		7:35	198.5 km	26.2 km/h
1956	14 February	-4.9°C	no winner declared (**)		—	190.5 km	—
1963	18 January	-7.7°C	Reinier Paping		10:59	196.5 km	17.9 km/h
			Winner men	Winner women (*)			
1985	21 February	0.3°C	Evert van Benthem	Lenie van der Hoorn	6:47	196.8 km	29.0 km/h
1986	26 February	-6.9°C	Evert van Benthem	Tineke Dijkshoorn	6:55	199.3 km	28.8 km/h
1997	4 January	-3.6°C	Henk Angenent	Klasina Seinstra	6:49	199.6 km	29.3 km/h
"History" (in Dutch). Vereniging De Friesche Elf Steden [Association of the Eleven Fries Cities].; * Women were first allowed to take part in the tour proper in 1985; before then they had to skate with the amateurs and no award was given. ** After shared wins in 1933 and 1940, when the front-runners decided not to compete but join hands to cross the line together, this practice was forbidden by the organisation. Jan van der Hoorn, Aad de Koning, Jeen Nauta, Maus Wijnhout and Anton Verhoeven however ignored this rule when they crossed the finish line in unison. They were not disqualified, but no winner was declared.: "3,000 Skaters in 124-mile race". The Times. No. 48527. London. 31 January 1940. col. B, p. 7.
