= Havelte =

- Village
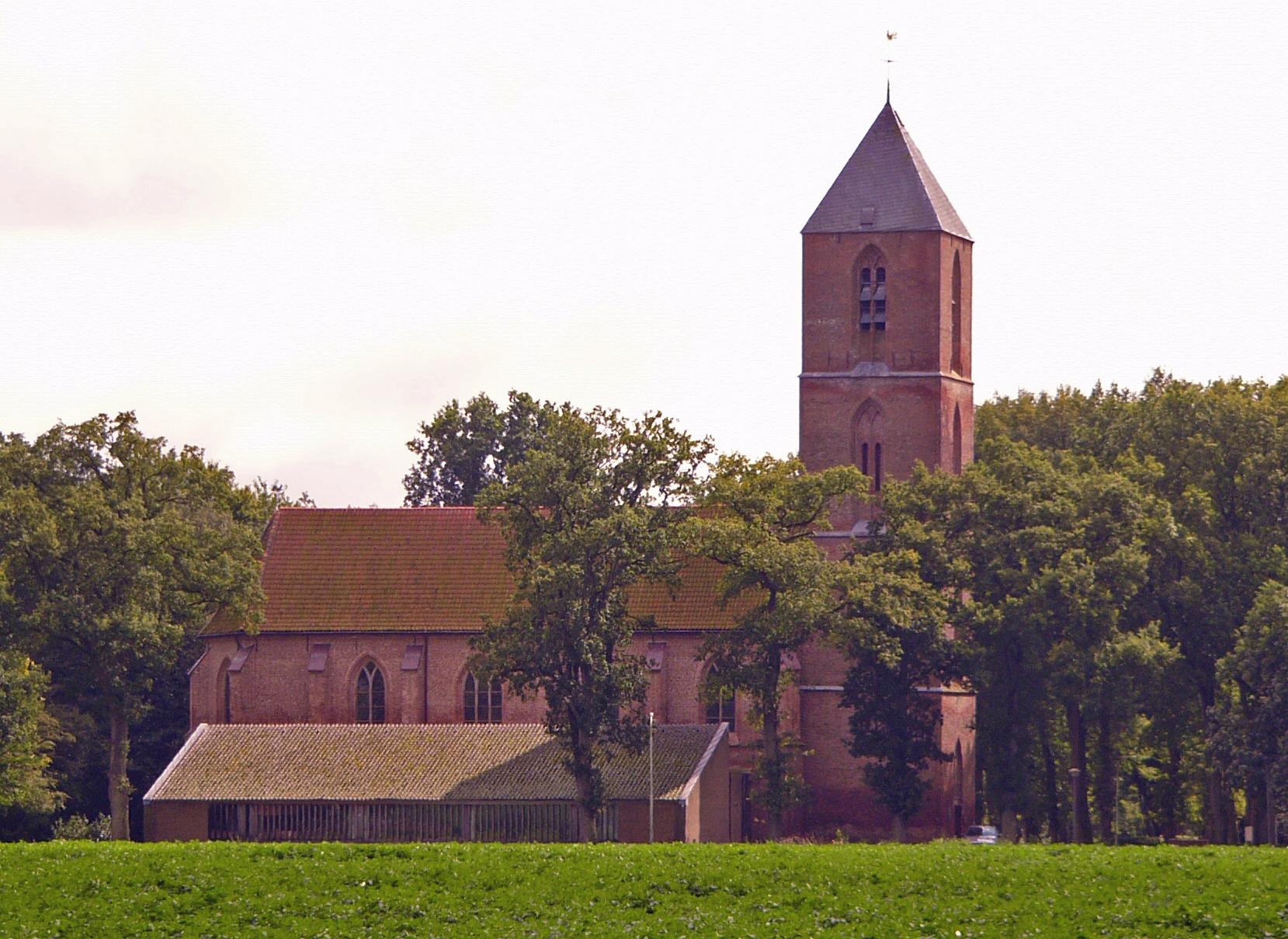
- Church in Havelte

- Flag Coat of arms

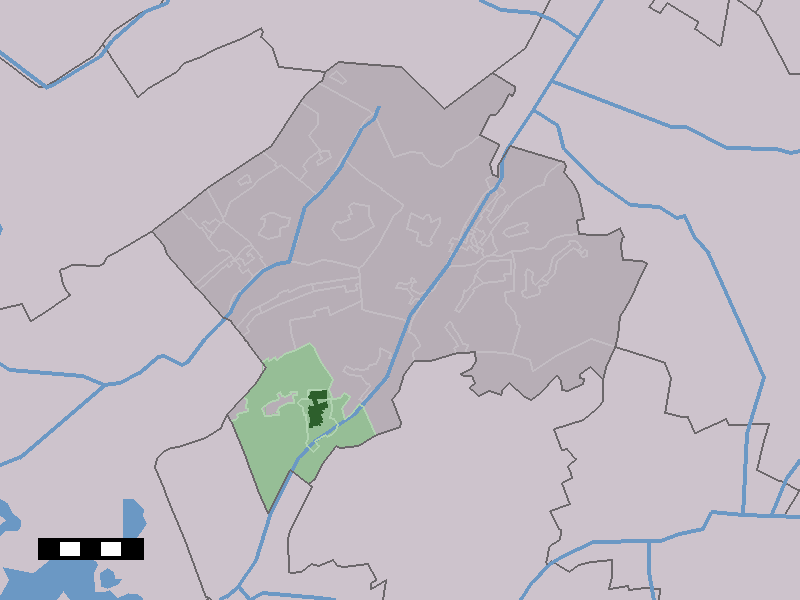
- The village centre (dark green) and the statistical district (light green) of Havelte in the municipality of Westerveld

- Location in province of Drenthe in the Netherlands Havelte (Netherlands)
- Coordinates: 52°46′N 6°14′E
- Country: Netherlands
- Province: Drenthe
- Municipality: Westerveld

Population (2021)
  - Total: 3,825
- Time zone: UTC+1 (CET)
  - Summer (DST): UTC+2 (CEST)
- Postal code: 7971
- Dialing code: 0521

Havelte (Drèents: Haovelte or Haovelt) is a village in the Northeastern Netherlands. It is located in the municipality of Westerveld, Drenthe, about 60 km (37.2 mi) south-southwest of Groningen and 120 km (74.5 mi) northeast of Amsterdam. As of 1 January 2021, it had a population of 3,825.

== History ==
The village was first mentioned in 1342 as "to Hovelde". The etymology is unclear. Havelte is an esdorp on a sandy ridge. It developed in the Late Middle Ages into a little village with four triangular village squares.

The hunebed (dolmen) D53 is located in Havelterberg near Havelte and is the second largest of the Netherlands. It spans nearly 18 metres (59 ft), and contains 9 capstones and 21 side stones. It used to have a beautiful ring of 40 stones. There were still 24 left in 1918 when Albert Egges van Giffen researched the dolmen. Nowadays, there are only 10 left. All the stones have been put back in there place in 1918.

The Dutch Reformed is located somewhat off-centre, because the villages of Darp and Uffelte had decided to build a joint church halfway between their villages. It was built in 1310 and enlarged in the 15th century. The tower dates from 1410. The estate Overcinge was first mentioned in 1313. The current building was built between 1630 and 1642. Between 1968 and 1969, it was altered into school building. In 1984, it became vacant and was restored to its pre-1870 design.

Havelte was home to 636 people in 1840. In October 1942, an airport was built near Havelte by the Luftwaffe. 5,600 forced labourers were transported to Havelte to construct the airport. It was hardly ever used, and attacked several times. On 24 March 1945, the Americans dropped 271 tons of bombs on the airport. The location is nowadays a nature area and some of the German buildings have remained. In 1952, the Dutch Army's Johannes Post Barracks was built, serving as headquarters and base of most of the units of the 43rd Mechanized Brigade.

Havelte was a separate municipality until 1998, when it became a part of Westerveld.

== Gallery ==
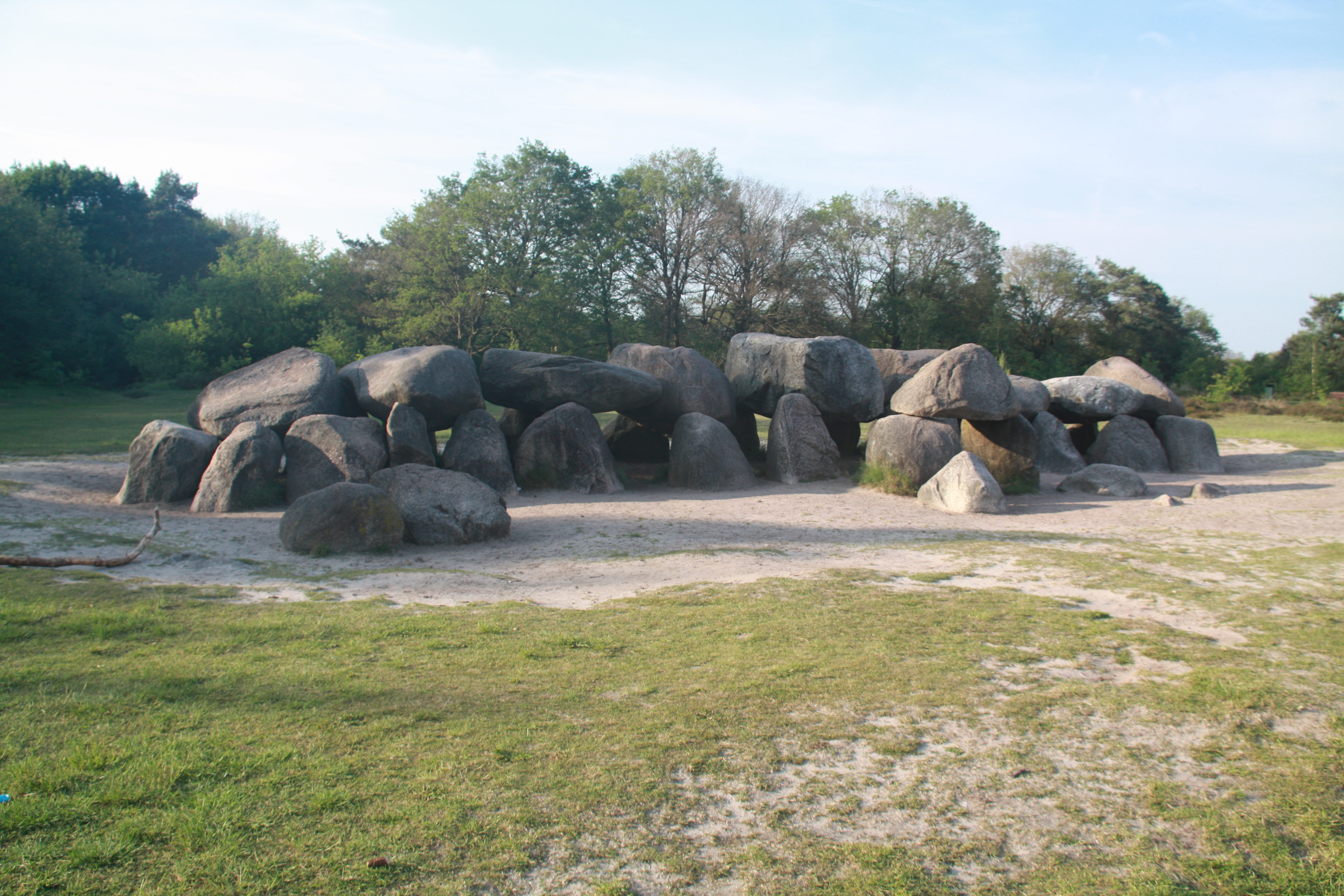
Dolmen D53

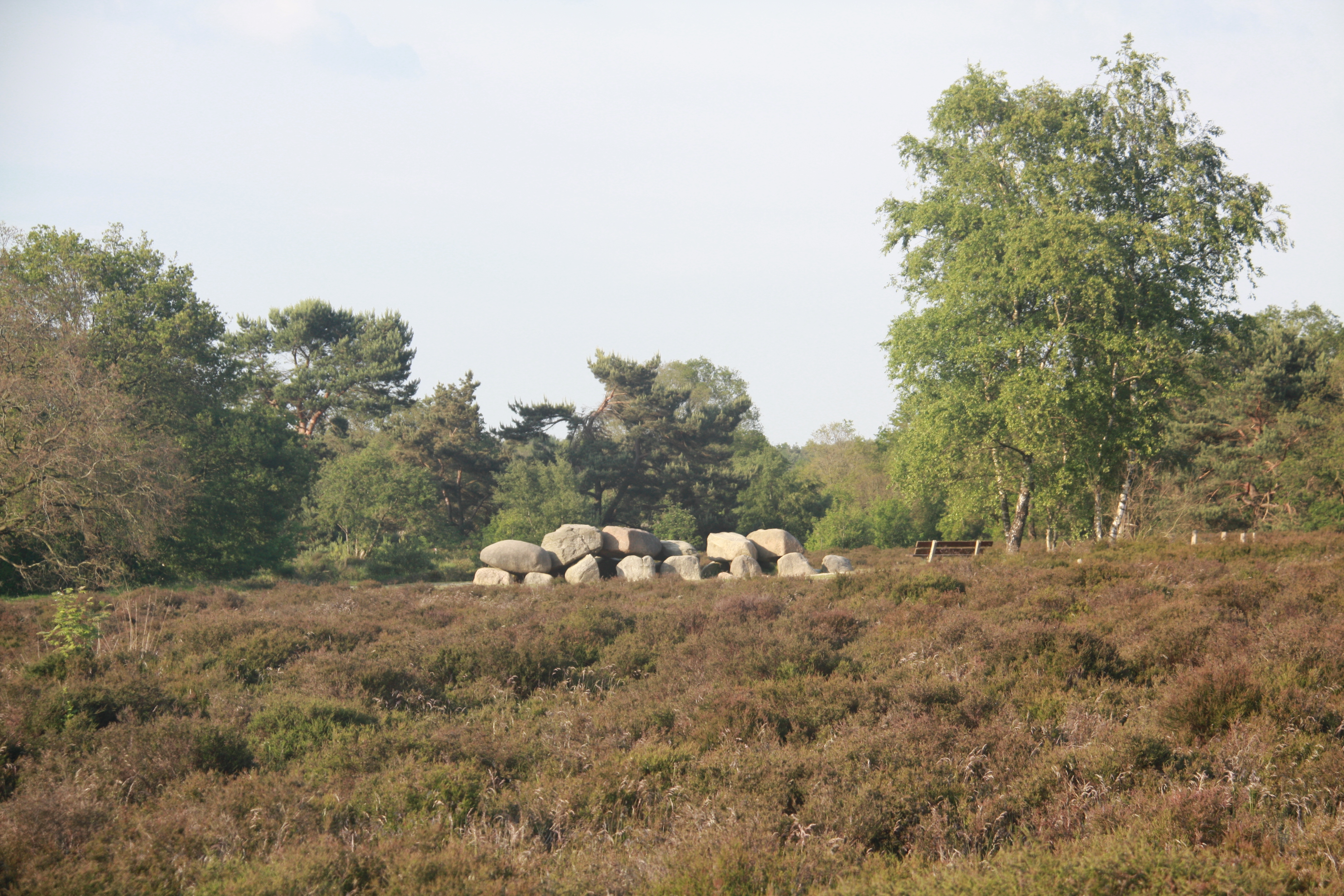
Dolmen D54

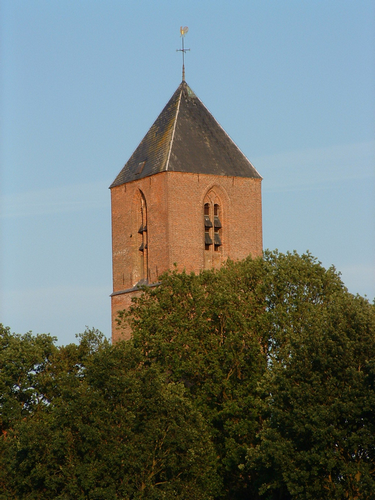
Church tower in Havelte

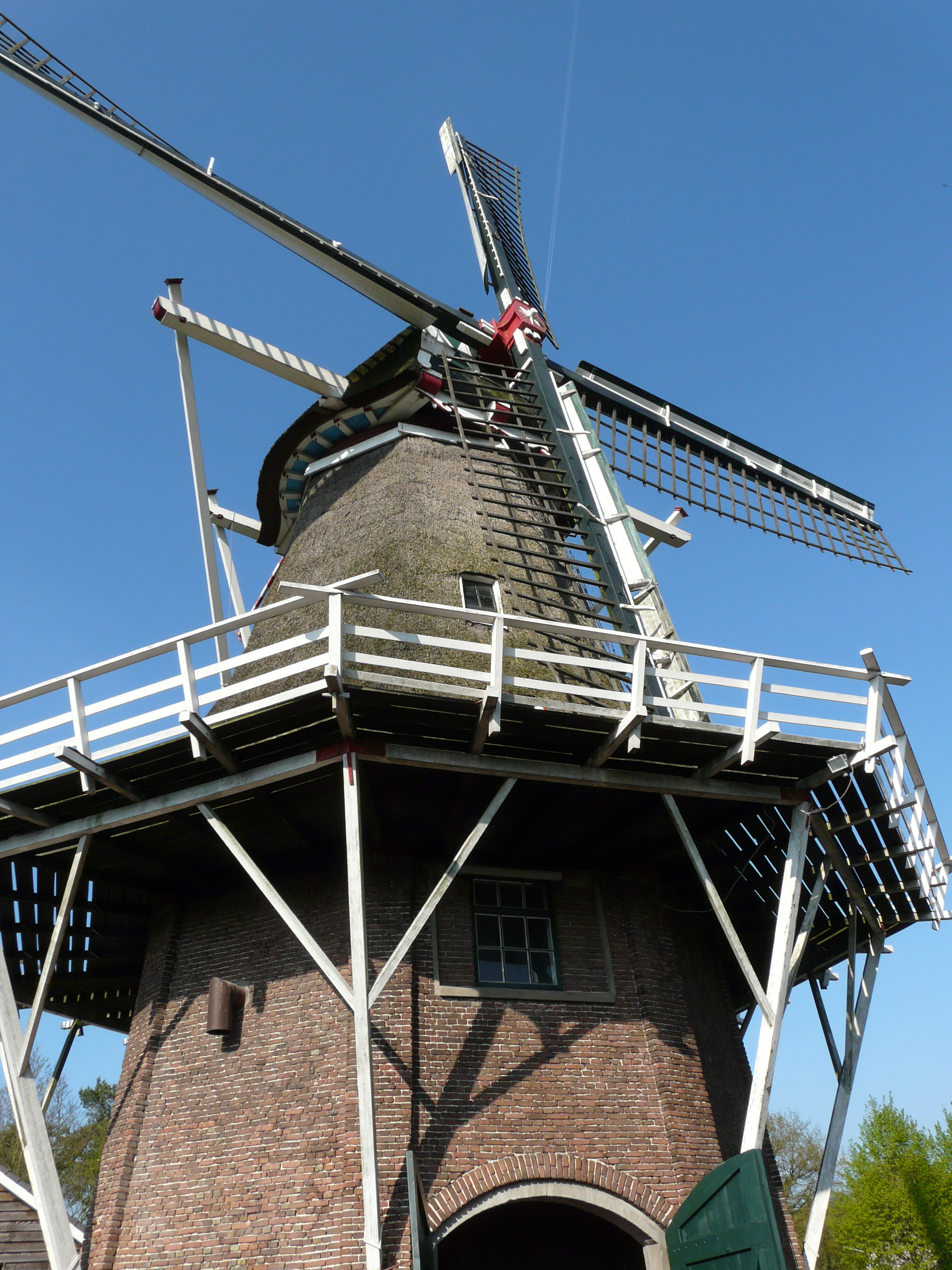
Havelter Molen
