= Noorderhoogebrug =

Noorderhoogebrug Hogebrug (Gronings)
- Village/hamlet
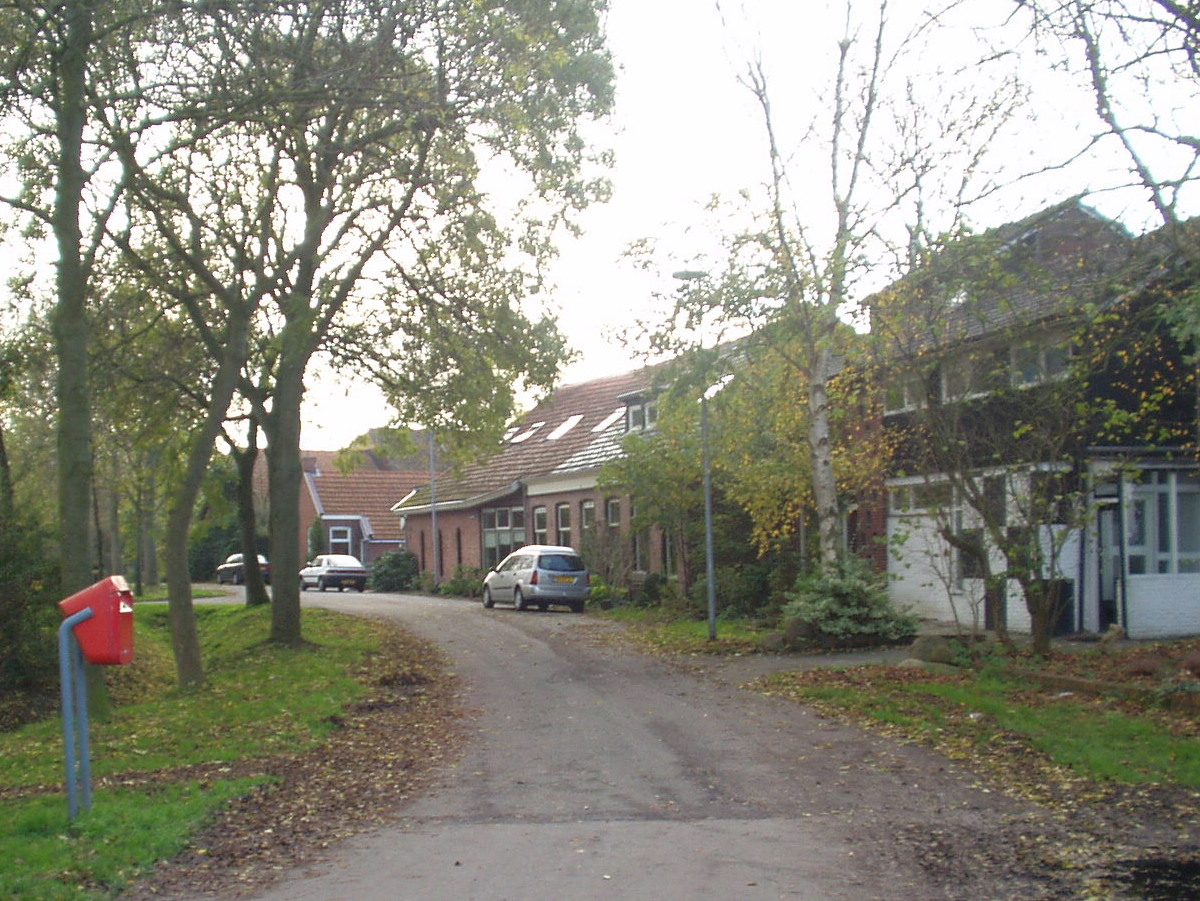
- Street in Noorderhoogebrug

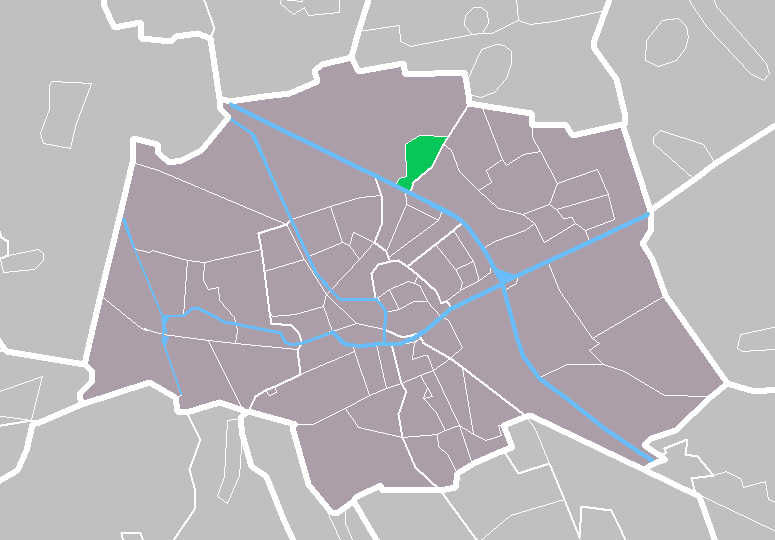
- Location in the city of Groningen

- Location in the province of Groningen in the Netherlands Noorderhoogebrug (Netherlands)
- Coordinates: 53°15′N 6°34′E
- Country: Netherlands
- Province: Groningen
- Municipality: Groningen

Area
  - Total: 0.61 km^{2} (0.24 sq mi)
- Elevation: 7 m (23 ft)

Population (2021)
  - Total: 275
  - Density: 450/km^{2} (1,200/sq mi)
- Demonym: Noorderhoogerbrugger
- Time zone: UTC+1 (CET)
  - Summer (DST): UTC+2 (CEST)
- Postcode: 9738
- Area code: 050

Noorderhoogebrug (Dutch: [ˈnordərɦoːxəˌbrʏx]; Gronings: Hogebrug) is a village or hamlet within the municipality of Groningen in the province of Groningen in the Netherlands with 275 inhabitants as of 2021. It is located within the city limits of Groningen.

The village has a large flour mill, the Wilhelmina. A sarries hut was located next to the mill. A house of the same name has been built on its foundations.

== Etymology ==
The name refers to the former bridge over the Boterdiep. There were two bridges with the name Hoogebrug near the city of Groningen, hence the addition of Noorder ('Northern'). The other Hoogebrug lay over the Damsterdiep and the place around that bridge is currently called Oosterhoogebrug. The bridge was called hoog ('high'), because this fixed bridge rose above the road and ships could easily pass under it. The bridge was opposite to the house at Molenstreek 8. Originally, the Walfridus Bridge was located here, which formed the entrance to the Wolddijk. Around 1500, the Walfridus Bridge was replaced by a high bridge. Whether this was for shipping or for some other reason is not known. After the completion of this bridge, the name Walfridusbrug fell out of use and was replaced by first, Hogherbrugge (1514), then Westerhoogebrug and then from about 1590 by Noorderhoogebrug. The current bridge of the village is the Boterdiep Bridge.

== History ==
Until 1969, the village belonged to the municipality of Noorddijk as far as the Molenstreek and surroundings are concerned. That municipality was particularly narrow here - only about 20 m of Noorddijk soil lay at the narrowest point between the then municipalities of Groningen and Bedum. The former café Stad en Lande was even on the municipal boundary. The living room was in Groningen, while the taproom was in Noorddijk. The rest of Noorderhoogebrug (the respective streets of Groningerweg and Wolddijk) belonged to the municipality of Bedum until the annexation by the municipality of Groningen.

== Gallery ==
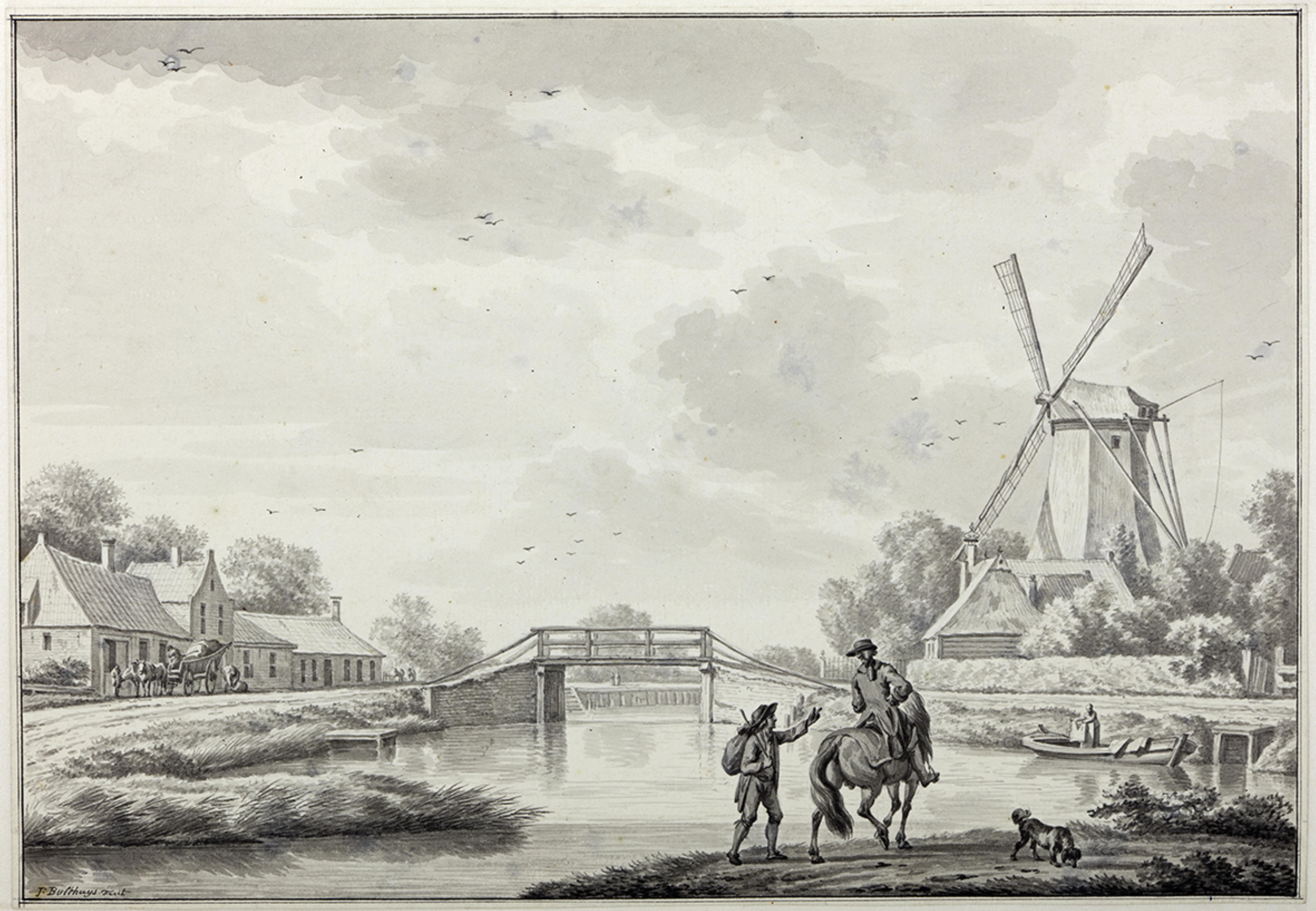
View of Noorderhoogebrug, by Jan Bulthuis

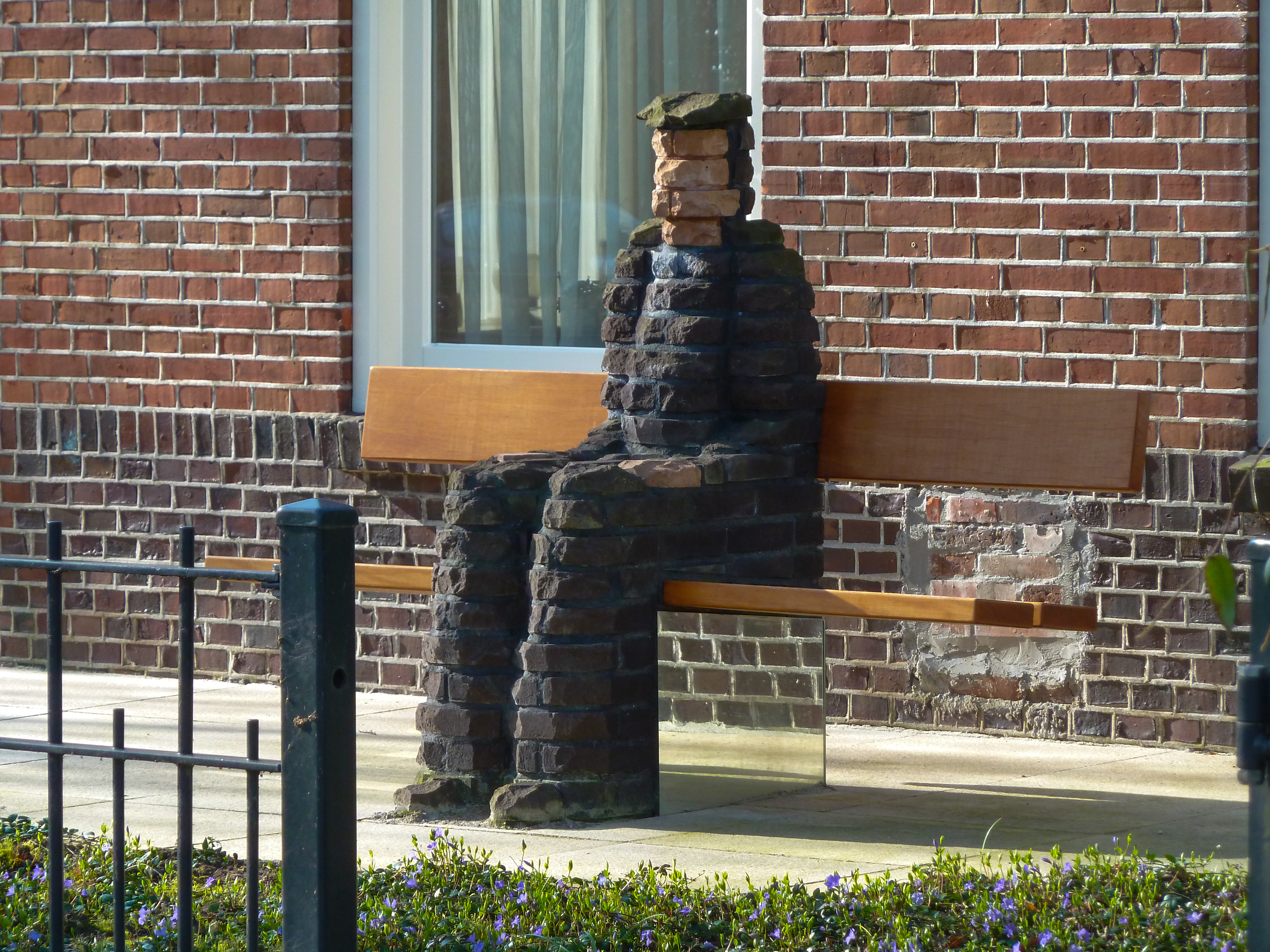
Stone man on bench in Noorderhoogebrug, by Jan Schoffelmeijer

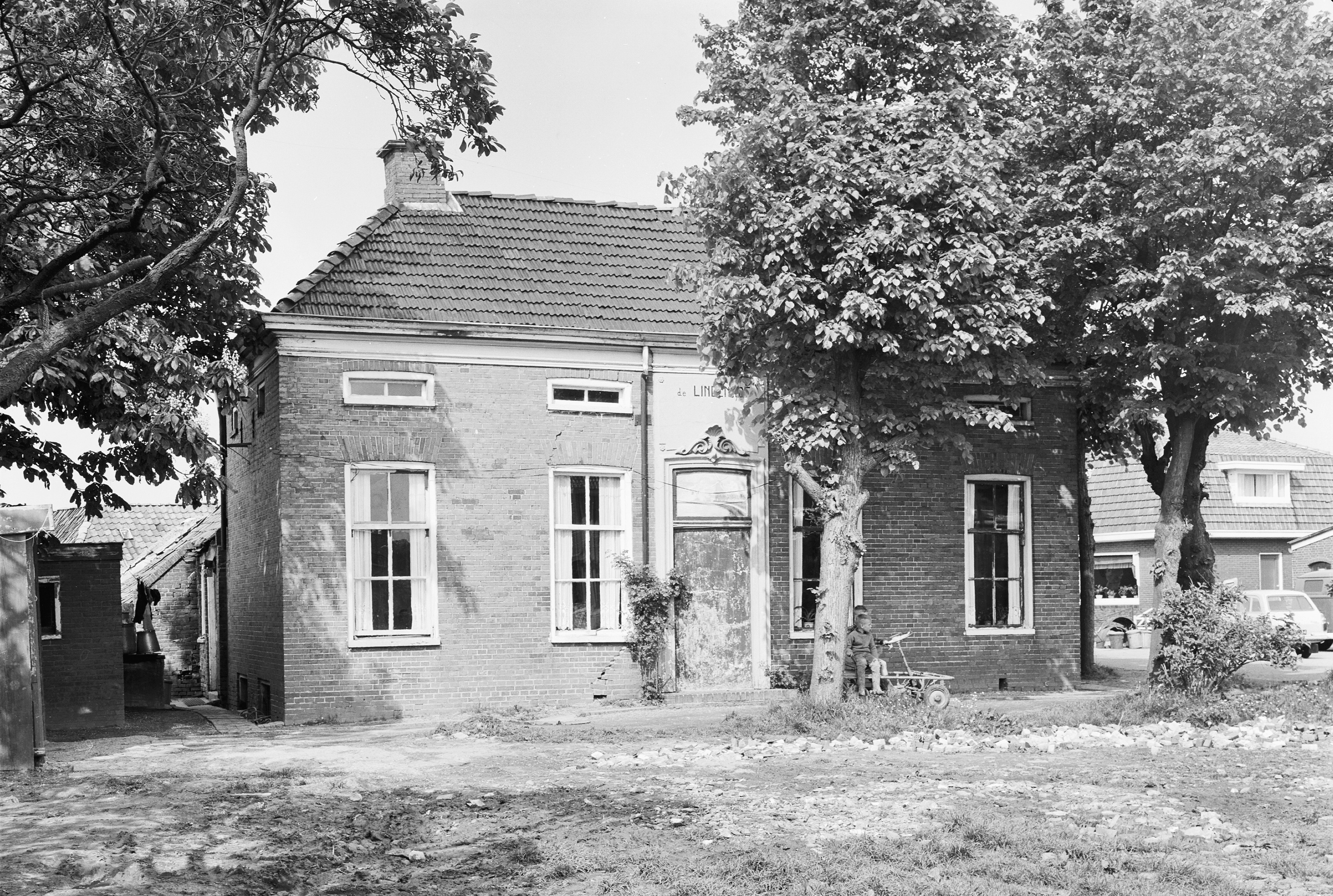
House in Noorderhoogebrug, 1967

== Notable people ==
- Jan Uitham (1925–2019), speed skater
