= Kees Adema =

American philatelist

Kees Adema is an American philatelist who signed the Roll of Distinguished Philatelists in 2010.
