= Jeen van den Berg =

Dutch speed skater

Jeen Jorg van den Berg
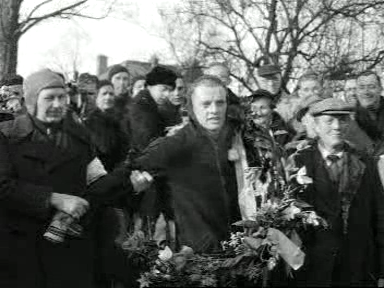
- Jeen van den Berg, Elfstedentocht winner 1954

Personal information
- Born: 8 January 1928 De Veenhoop, Netherlands
- Died: 8 October 2014 (aged 86) Heerenveen, Netherlands

Sport
- Country: Netherlands
- Sport: Speed skating
Medal record
Men's speed skating
Representing the Netherlands
Dutch Marathon Championships
Gold medal – first place	1973	Natural ice

Jeen van den Berg (8 January 1928 – 8 October 2014) was a Dutch long track speed skating athlete primarily known as the winner of the Elfstedentocht of 1954. He competed in the race a record seven times, with his first race being in 1947 and his final one in 1997.

On 3 February 1954, van den Berg finished the race in a record 7 hours and 35 minutes, a record finally bettered by Evert van Benthem 31 years later. He came third in the infamous 1963 race.

In 1973 he became the first Dutch marathon skate champion.

== Olympic Games ==
As a long-track speed skater, Van den Berg took part at the 1956 and 1960 Winter Olympics. In 1956 he finished 24th at the 5000 meters and in 1960 he ended 19th at the 5000 and 22nd at the 1500 meters.

== Personal records ==
Personal records
Men's Speed skating
Event	Result	Date	Location	Notes
500 meter	44.8	24 January 1959	Oslo	
1000 meter	1:43.5	20 February 1954	Appingedam	
1500 meter	2:16.5	31 January 1960	Davos	
3000 meter	4:48.4	14 January 1959	Hamar	
5000 meter	8:08.5	16 February 1960	Squaw Valley	
10000 meter	17:04.4	17 February 1960	Davos	

== Tournament overview ==
Season	Dutch Championships Allround	European Championships Allround	Olympic Games	World Championships Allround	Elfstedentocht Eleven City Tour	Loosdrecht Tour	Spannenburg Tour
1950–51	ZUTPHEN 21st 500m 6th 5000m DNS 1500m DNS 10000m NC overall						
1953–54	ZWOLLE 13th 500m (bronze) 5000m 7th 1500m 6th 10000m 6th overall				FRIESLAND (gold) ca.200 km		
1954–55	HEERENVEEN 11th 500m (silver) 5000m 23rd 1500m (bronze) 10000m 5th overall						
1955–56	KRALINGEN 8th 500m (bronze) 5000m (gold) 1500m (bronze) 10000m (silver) overall		CORTINA d'AMPEZZO 24th 5000m		FRIESLAND 6th ca.200 km		
1956–57				ÖSTERSUND 27th 500m 11th 5000m 23rd 1500m 9th 10000m 16th overall			
1957–58		ESKILSTUNA 27th 500m 16th 5000m 24th 1500m 7th 10000m 16th overall		HELSINKI 38th 500m 7th 5000m 21st 1500m 14th 10000m 16th overall			
1958–59		GOTHENBURG 36th 500m 7th 5000m 25th 1500m 11th 10000m 16th overall		OSLO 35th 500m 9th 5000m 35th 1500m 14th 10000m 15th overall			
1959–60		OSLO 24th 500m 13th 5000m 16th 1500m 13th 10000m 13th overall	SQUAW VALLEY 19th 5000m 22nd 10000m	DAVOS 32nd 500m 10th 5000m 20th 1500m 4th 10000m 13th overall			
1961–62	AMSTERDAM 25th 500m 15th 5000m 11th 1500m 11th 10000m 11th overall						SPANNENBURG (gold) ca.60 km
1962–63	GRONINGEN 17th 500m 8th 5000m 11th 1500m (bronze) 10000m 6th overall				FRIESLAND (bronze) ca.200 km		
1963–64						LOOSDRECHT (gold) ca.120 km	

DNS = Did not start
NC = No classification

== Personal life and death ==
Married to Atty, van den Berg was a teacher by profession. In 2014 he suffered a cerebral hemorrhage and died in a nursing home on 8 October 2014 at the age of 86.

Year	Date	Temperature	Winner (*)		Time	Distance	Average speed
1909	2 January	n/a	Minne Hoekstra		13:50	189 km	13.7 km/h
1912	7 February	3.8°C	Coen de Koning		11:40	189 km	16.2 km/h
1917	27 January	-1.8°C	Coen de Koning		9:53	189 km	19.1 km/h
1929	12 February	-10.1°C	Karst Leemburg		11:09	191 km	17.1 km/h
1933	16 December	-2.0°C	Abe de Vries; Sipke Castelein		9:53	195 km	19.7 km/h
1940	30 January	-6.1°C	Piet Keijzer; Auke Adema; Cor Jongert; Durk van der Duim; Sjouke Westra		11:34	198.5 km	17.3 km/h
1941	7 February	0.0°C	Auke Adema		9:19	198.5 km	21.3 km/h
1942	22 January	-11.7°C	Sietze de Groot		8:44	198 km	22.7 km/h
1947	8 February	-8.5°C	Jan W. van der Hoorn		10:51	191 km	17.6 km/h
1954	3 February	-5.4°C	Jeen van den Berg		7:35	198.5 km	26.2 km/h
1956	14 February	-4.9°C	no winner declared (**)		—	190.5 km	—
1963	18 January	-7.7°C	Reinier Paping		10:59	196.5 km	17.9 km/h
			Winner men	Winner women (*)			
1985	21 February	0.3°C	Evert van Benthem	Lenie van der Hoorn	6:47	196.8 km	29.0 km/h
1986	26 February	-6.9°C	Evert van Benthem	Tineke Dijkshoorn	6:55	199.3 km	28.8 km/h
1997	4 January	-3.6°C	Henk Angenent	Klasina Seinstra	6:49	199.6 km	29.3 km/h
"History" (in Dutch). Vereniging De Friesche Elf Steden [Association of the Eleven Fries Cities].; * Women were first allowed to take part in the tour proper in 1985; before then they had to skate with the amateurs and no award was given. ** After shared wins in 1933 and 1940, when the front-runners decided not to compete but join hands to cross the line together, this practice was forbidden by the organisation. Jan van der Hoorn, Aad de Koning, Jeen Nauta, Maus Wijnhout and Anton Verhoeven however ignored this rule when they crossed the finish line in unison. They were not disqualified, but no winner was declared.: "3,000 Skaters in 124-mile race". The Times. No. 48527. London. 31 January 1940. col. B, p. 7.
