= List of people from Amsterdam =

This is a list of notable people from Amsterdam, the capital and most-populated city of the Netherlands.

== Born in Amsterdam ==
The following were born or adopted in Amsterdam. Some became famous after they moved away.

=== A ===
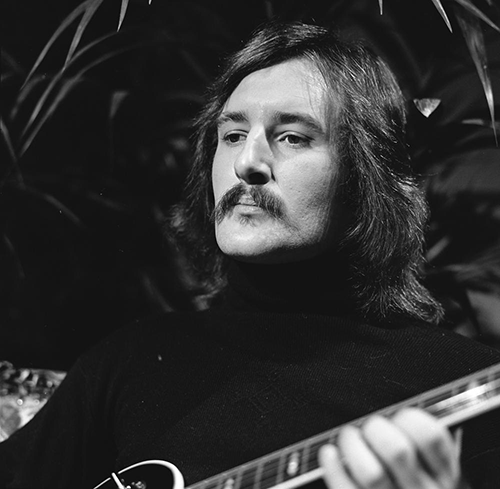
Jan Akkerman

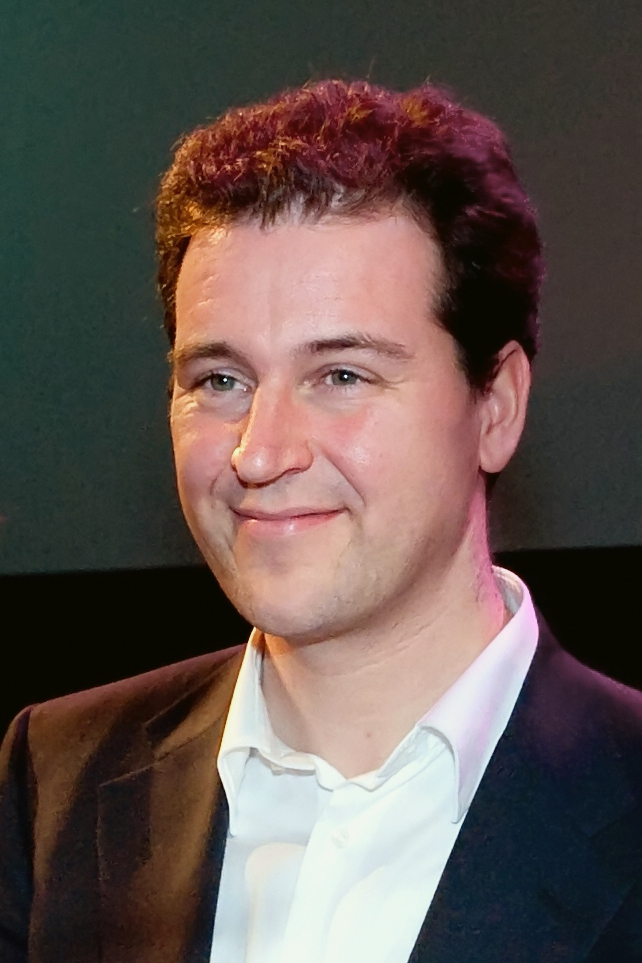
Lodewijk Asscher

- Bertus Aafjes (1914–1993), writer
- Hans Aarsman (born 1951), photographer, author and academic lecturer
- Jan van Aartsen (1909–1992), politician and jurist
- Co Adriaanse (born 1947), football trainer
- Pieter Aertsen (1508–1575), painter in the style of Northern Mannerism
- Stella Agsteribbe (1909–1943), gymnast
- Cris Agterberg (1883–1948), artist and ceramist
- Achmed Ahahaoui (born 1983), football player
- Jan Akkerman (born 1946), guitarist
- Willeke Alberti (born 1945), singer and actress
- Willy Alberti (1926–1985; real name: Carel Verbrugge), singer and actor
- Ernst van Altena (1933–1999), poet, writer and translator
- Martin van Amerongen (1941–2002), journalist, publisher, columnist and author
- Willeke van Ammelrooy (born 1944), actor
- Hans Andreus (1926–1977), poet and writer
- Edwin van Ankeren (born 1968), football player
- Caroline Ansink (born 1959), musician, music educator and composer
- Jarchinio Antonia (born 1990), football player
- Mitch Apau (born 1990), football player
- Karel Appel (1921–2006), painter, sculptor and poet
- Armando (1929–2018), real name: HD van Doodeweerd; painter, sculptor and writer
- Willem Arondeus (1894–1943), artist, author and WWII resistance member
- Alex Aronson (1934–1975), aid worker executed in Ba'athist Iraq
- Lodewijk Asscher (born 1974), politician and jurist
- Tobias Asser (1838–1913), lawyer and legal scholar
- Raymond Atteveld (born 1966), football player and football trainer
- Hendrick Avercamp (1585–1634), painter
- Lion Axwijk (born 1984), football player

=== B ===
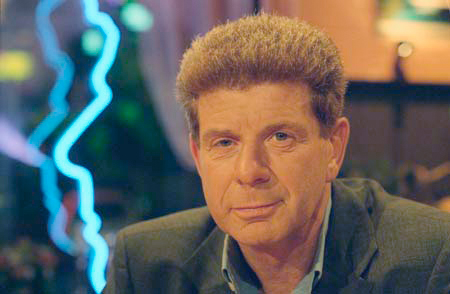
Frits Barend, 1988

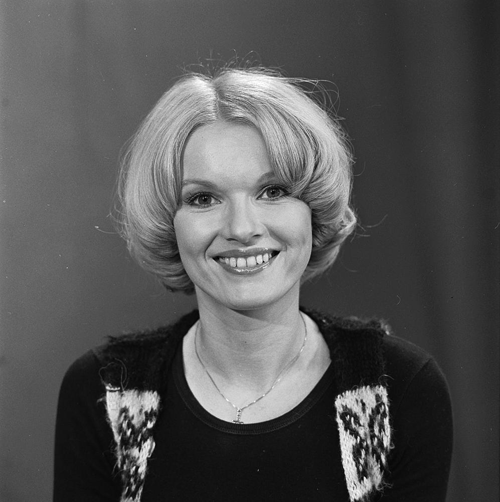
Martine Bijl

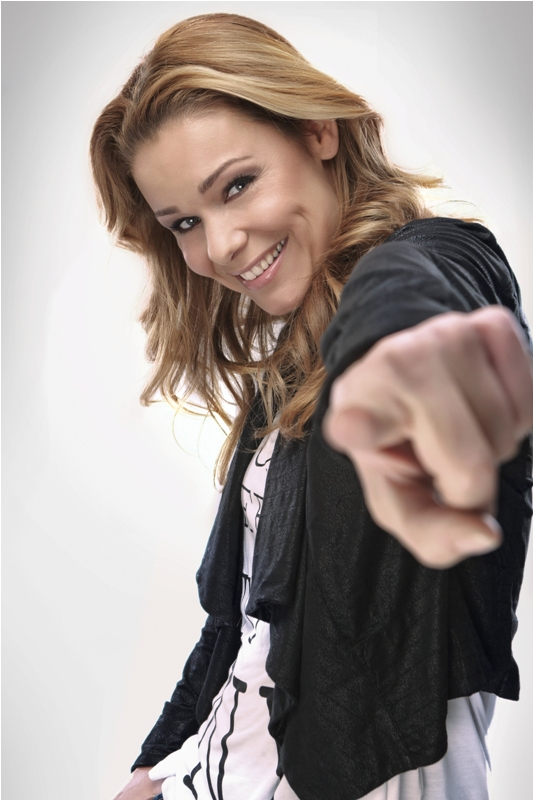
Froukje de Both

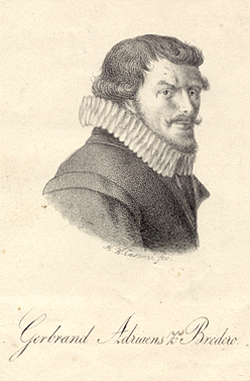
Gerbrand Bredero

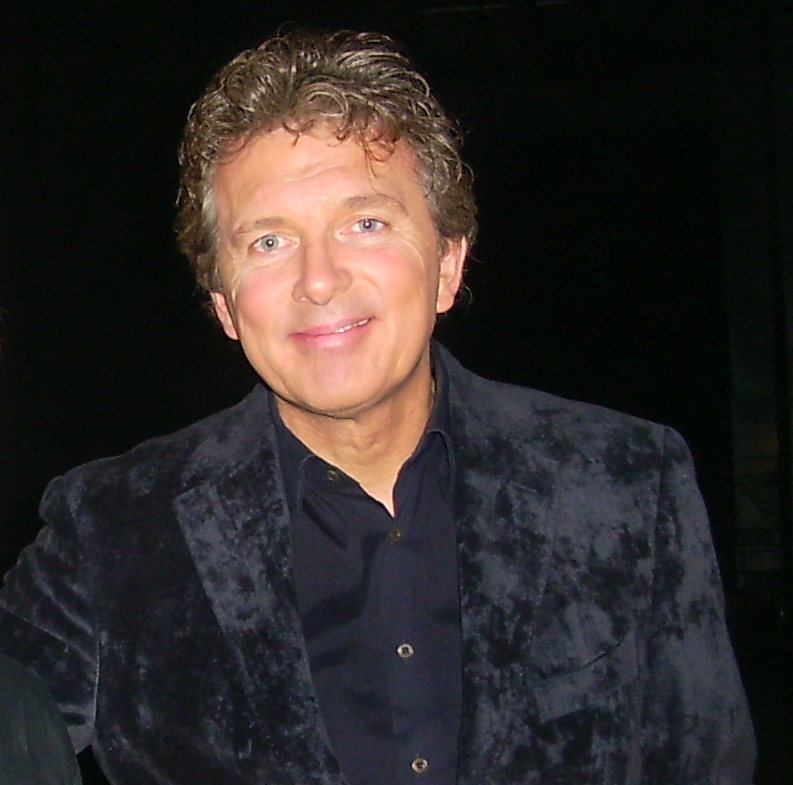
Robert ten Brink

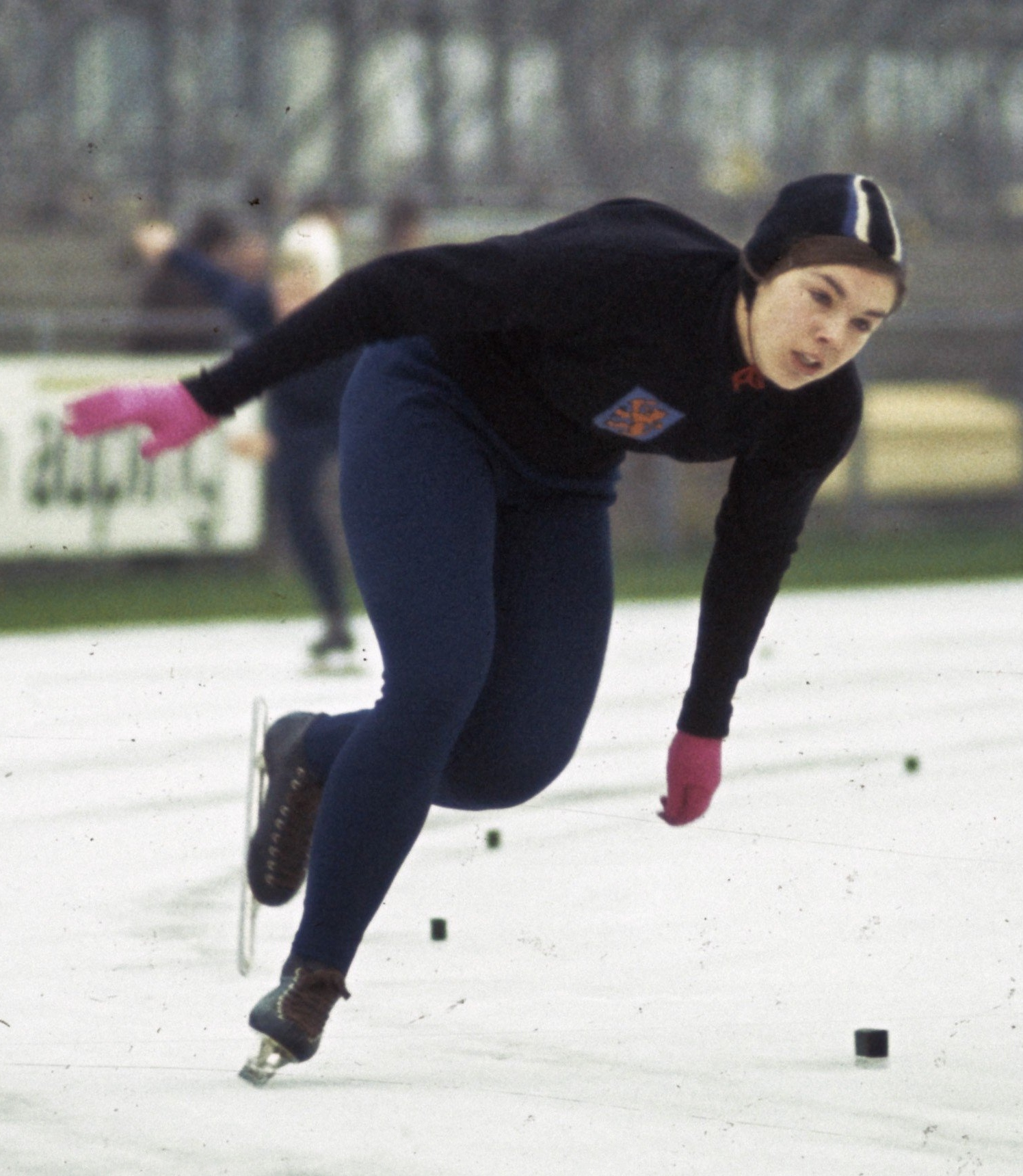
Ellie van den Brom, 1968

- Tine Baanders (1890–1971), illustrator, graphic designer and teacher
- Herman Ambrosius Jan Baanders (1876–1953), architect, designer and entrepreneur
- Ryan Babel (born 1986), football player
- Jan Bank (born 1940), historian and local politician
- Adnan Barakat (born 1982), football player
- Frits Barend (born 1947), TV presenter
- Sonja Barend (born 1940), TV personality and former talk show host
- Robbert Baruch (born 1967), politicus
- Sarah Bavly (1900–1993), nutrition education pioneer in Israel
- Kiran Bechan (born 1982), football player
- Sheraldo Becker (born 1995), football player
- Willibrord van Beek (born 1949), retired politician and financial adviser
- Anton Albert Beekman (1854–1947), geographer
- Frieda Belinfante (1904–1995), cellist, conductor, resistance member
- Nick van den Berg (born 1980), professional pool player
- Chris Berger (1911–1965), athlete
- Harry van den Bergh (1942–2020), politician
- Dennis Bergkamp (born 1969), football player
- Vera Bergkamp (born 1971), politicus
- Lobke Berkhout (born 1980), sailor
- Gerrit Cornelis Berkouwer (1903–1996), theologian
- Hendrik Petrus Berlage (1856–1934), architect
- Helen Berman (born 1936; born as Hélène Julia Cohen)
- Ron Berteling (born 1957), retired ice hockey player and coach
- Jan George Bertelman (1782–1854), componist
- Ernst van der Beugel (1918–2004), economist, businessman, diplomat and politician
- Jan van Beveren (1948–2011), football goalkeeper and coach
- Jean Bevers (1852–1909), politician
- Agathe L. van Beverwijk (1907–1958), mycologist
- Ronny Bierman (1938–1984), actor
- Martine Bijl (1948–2019)
- Willem Bilderdijk (1756–1831), writer
- Diego Biseswar (born 1988), football player
- Adriaan Blaauw (1914–2010), astronomer
- Ton Blanker (born 1960), football player
- Michael Bleekemolen (born 1949), racing driver
- Cor Blekemolen (1894–1972), cyclist
- Daley Blind (born 1990), football player
- Jan Blokker (1927–2010), journalist, writer and amateur historian
- Margreeth de Boer (born 1939), politician and mayor of Leeuwarden, 2001–2004
- Piet de Boer (1919–1984), football player
- Sacha de Boer (born 1967), photographer, presenter and former journalist
- Gé Bohlander (1895–1940) & Willy Bohlander (1891–1939), water polo players
- Daniël Boissevain (born 1969), actor
- Frits Bolkestein (born 1933), retired politician and businessman
- Vic Bonke (1940–2022), politician
- Rik van den Boog (born 1959), football manager and former player
- Els Borst (1932–2014), government minister
- Piet Borst (born 1934), professor of clinical biochemistry and molecular biology
- Annie Bos (1886–1875), actor
- Pieter Philip van Bosse (1809–1879), politician
- Carlo Boszhard (born 1969), TV personality, singer, impersonator and host
- Ron Boszhard (born 1963), TV presenter
- Mbark Boussoufa (born 1984), football player
- Bob Bonte (1929–1988), swimmer
- Ferdinand Bordewijk (1884–1965), writer
- Froukje de Both (born 1972), actor
- Ina Boudier-Bakker (1875–1966)
- Esaias Boursse (1631–1672), painter
- Dries Boussatta (born 1972), football player
- Henk Bouwman (1926–1995)
- Mies Bouwman (1929–2018), TV presenter
- Mohammed Bouyeri (born 1978), murdered Dutch film director Theo van Gogh
- Nouchka van Brakel (born 1940), film director
- Gerbrand Bredero (1585–1618), poet and playwright
- Willem Breuker (1944–2010), composer, arranger, saxophonist and clarinetist
- Karim Bridji (born 1981), football player
- Bernhard Egidius Konrad ten Brink (1841–1892), German philologist
- Robert ten Brink (born 1955), TV presenter
- Brian Brobbey (born 2002), football player
- Jan Broekhuis (1901–1973)
- Cor Brom (1932–2008), football player and football trainer
- Ellie van den Brom (born 1949), retired speed skater
- Frans Brüggen (1934–2014), conductor, recorder player and baroque flautist
- Tina de Bruin (born 1975), actress
- Tonny Bruins Slot (1947–2020), football trainer
- Klaas Bruinsma (1953–1991), drug lord
- Johannes Burman (1706–1779), botanist and physician
- Pieter Burman the Younger (1713–1778), philologist
- Ann Burton (1933–1989), jazz singer

=== C ===
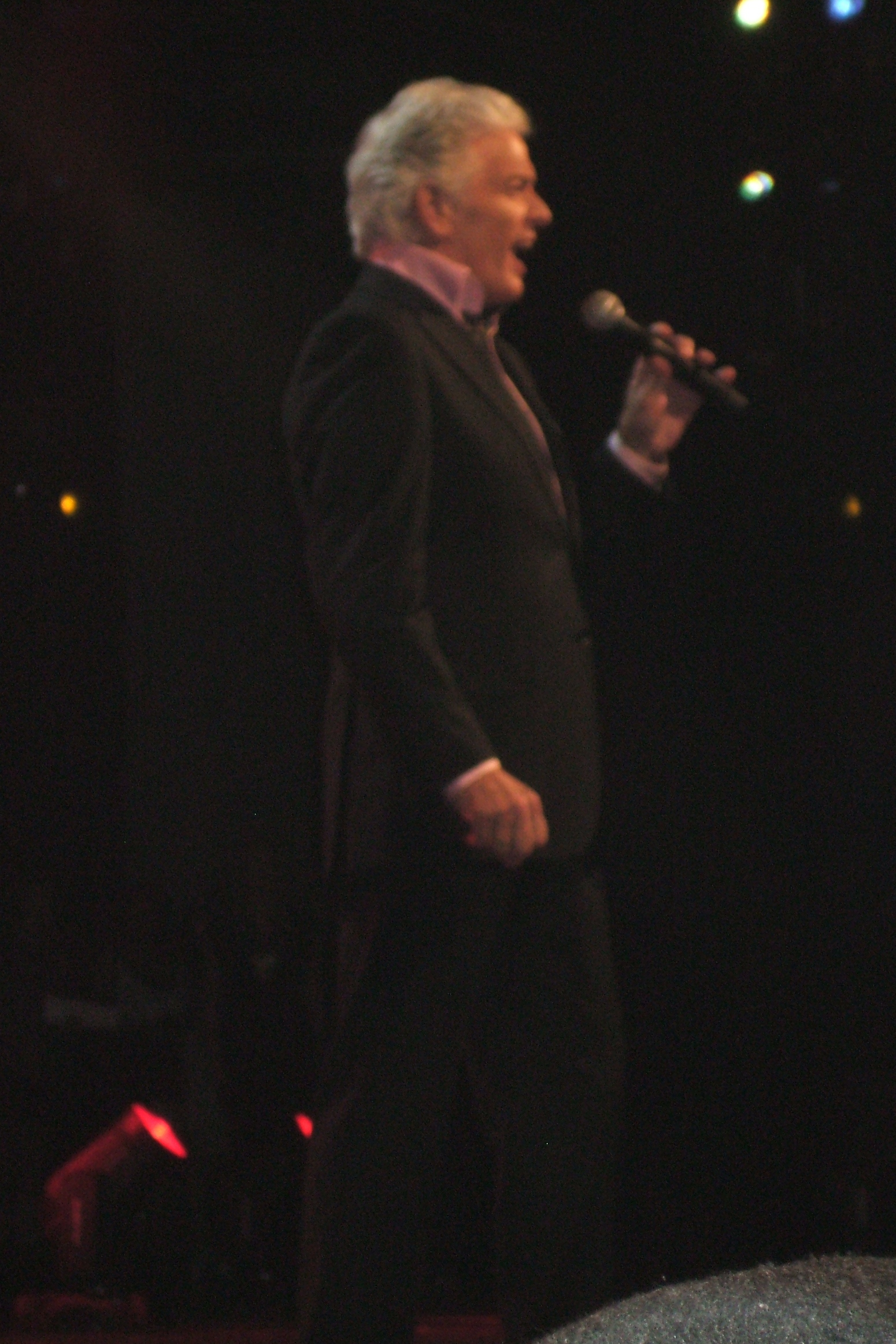
Ben Cramer

- Juultje Cambré (1914–1990), jazz trumpeter and singer
- Maup Caransa (1916–2009), businessman and real-estate developer
- David de Jahacob Lopez Cardozo (1808–1890), Talmudist
- Mirano Carrilho (born 1975), football player
- Charlene de Carvalho-Heineken (born 1954), billionaire businesswoman, owns 25% of Heineken N.V.
- Henk ten Cate (born 1954), football player and football trainer
- Leontien Ceulemans (1952–2022), actress and television and radio presenter
- Mohammed Chaara (born 1980), actor
- Sarah Chronis (born 1986), actor
- Charles van Commenée (born 1958), athletics coach
- Karina Content (born 1960), writer and politician
- Dirck Coornhert (1522–1590), writer, philosopher, politician, theologian and artist
- Athanase Josué Coquerel (1820–1875), French Protestant theologian
- Paulien Cornelisse (born 1976)
- Uri Coronel (1946–2016), sports director (AFC Ajax)
- Isaäc da Costa (1798–1860), Jewish poet
- Ben Cramer (born 1947; born as Kramer), singer and actor
- Jacqueline Cramer (born 1951), politician and biologist
- Manja Croiset (1946–2022), Dutch author
- Johan Cruijff (1947–2016), football player and football trainer
- Paul Crutzen (1933–2021), meteorologist and atmospheric chemist

=== D ===
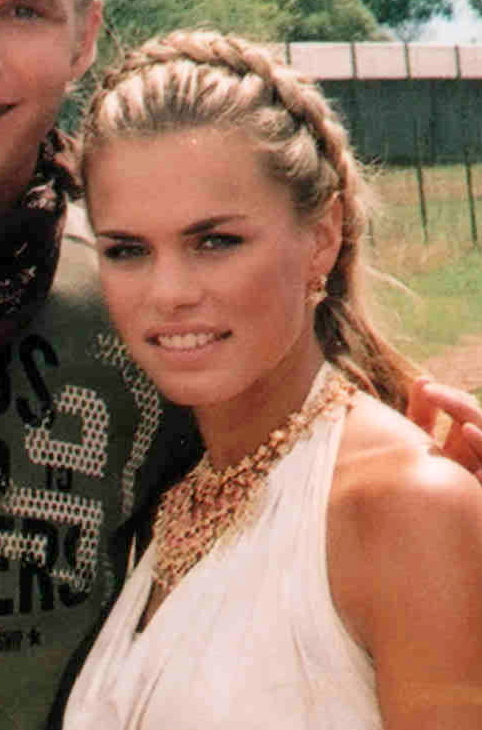
Nicolette van Dam

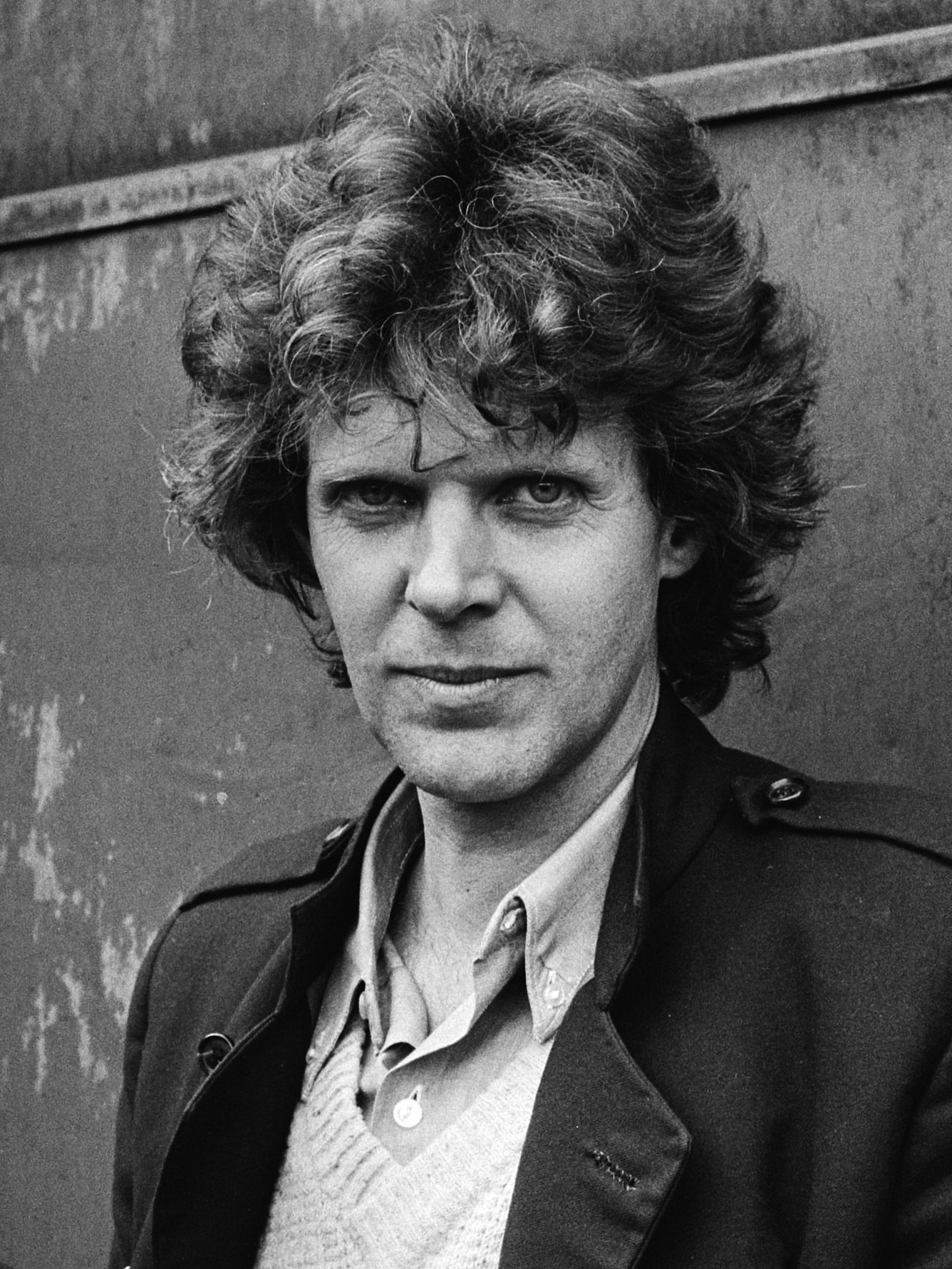
Rudi van Dantzig, 1979

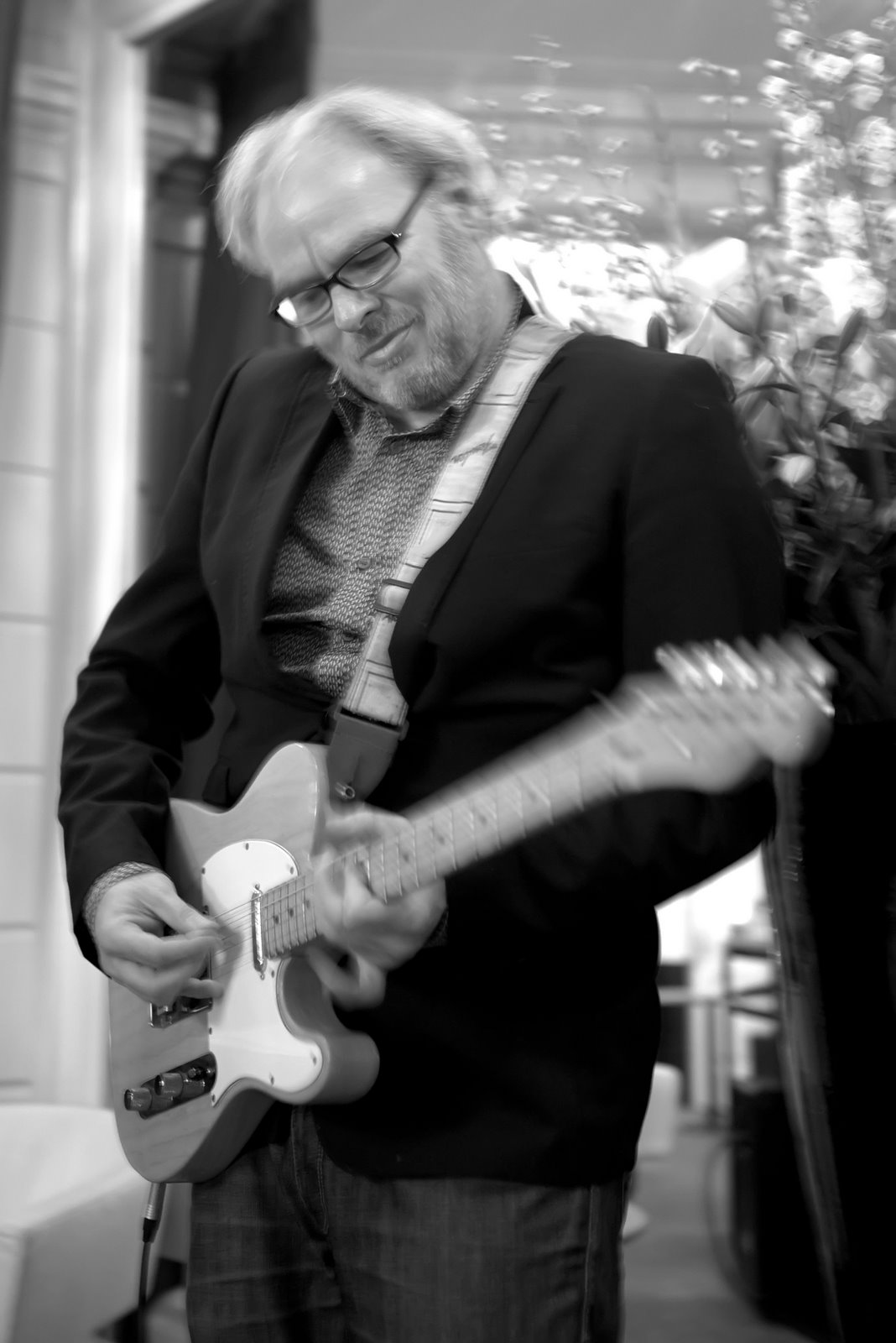
Nico Dijkshoorn

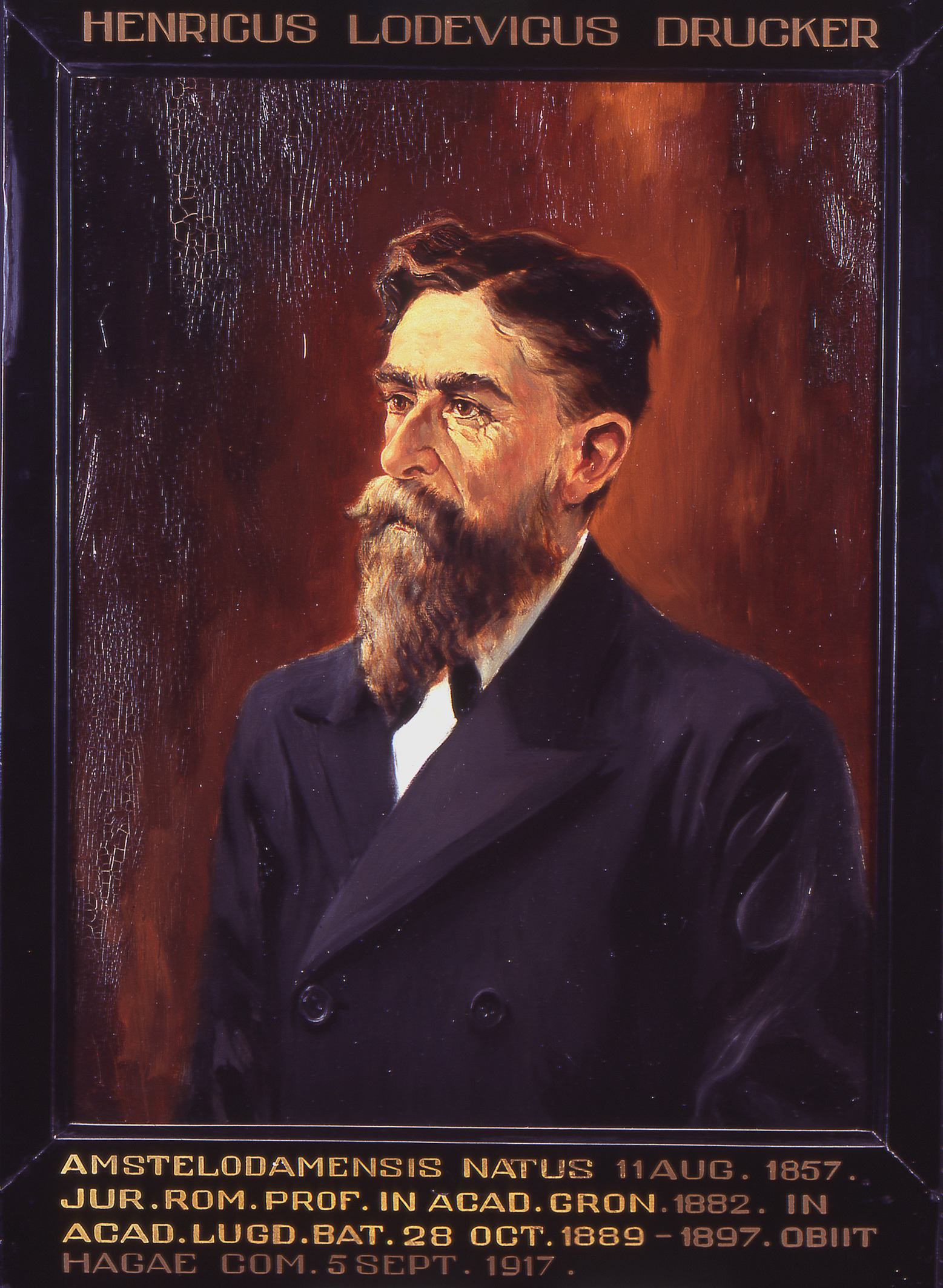
Hendrik Lodewijk Drucker, 1897

- Dyron Daal (born 1983), football player
- Monique van Daalen (born 1960), diplomat
- Johannes van Dam (1946–2013), journalist, writer on food
- Nicolette van Dam (born 1984), actress, model and TV host
- Elly Dammers (1921–2009), athlete
- Rudi van Dantzig (1933–2012), choreographer, company director, and writer
- Sir Matthew Decker, 1st Baronet (1679–1749), merchant and economist
- Eduard Douwes Dekker (1820–1887), writer, pen name, Multatuli
- Thomas Dekker (born 1984), cyclist
- Lex van Delden (1947–2010), actor
- Thierry Detant (born 1965), Olympic cyclist
- Boy Deul (born 1987), football player
- Ineke Dezentjé Hamming-Bluemink (born 1954), former politician
- Gé van Dijk (1923–2005), football player
- Nico Dijkshoorn (born 1960), author, columnist, blogger, poet and musician
- Loek Dikker (born 1944), pianist, conductor and composer
- Michael Dingsdag (born 1982), football player
- Charles Dissels (born 1984), football player
- Tijn Docter (born 1972), actor
- Bram de Does (1934–2015), graphic and type designer
- Ferdinand Domela Nieuwenhuis (1846–1919), politicus
- Luciano Dompig (born 1987), football player
- Mitchell Donald (born 1988), football player
- Peter van Dongen (born 1966), cartoonist
- Ryan Donk (born 1986), football player
- Piet Hein Donner (born 1948), politicus
- Agaath Doorgeest (1914–1991), athlete
- Tamar van den Dop (born 1970)
- Steve van Dorpel (1965–1989), football player
- Eduard Douwes Dekker (1820–1887), writer
- Willem Drees Sr. (1886–1988), politician and prime minister of the Netherlands, 1948–1958
- Dana van Dreven (born 1974), gabber, DJ and producer
- Nick Driebergen (born 1987), swimmer
- Kees Driehuis (1951–2019), journalist and TV host
- Hendrik Lodewijk Drucker (1857–1917), politicus
- Wilhelmina Drucker (1847–1925), politician, writer and early feminist
- Pierre H. Dubois (1917–1999), writer and critic
- Willem Dudok (1884–1974), modernist architect
- Hans Dulfer (born 1940), tenor saxophone jazz musician
- Jeroen Duyster (born 1966), coxswain, Olympic gold medallist
- Linda van Dyck (1948; born as Linda de Hartogh), actor

=== E ===
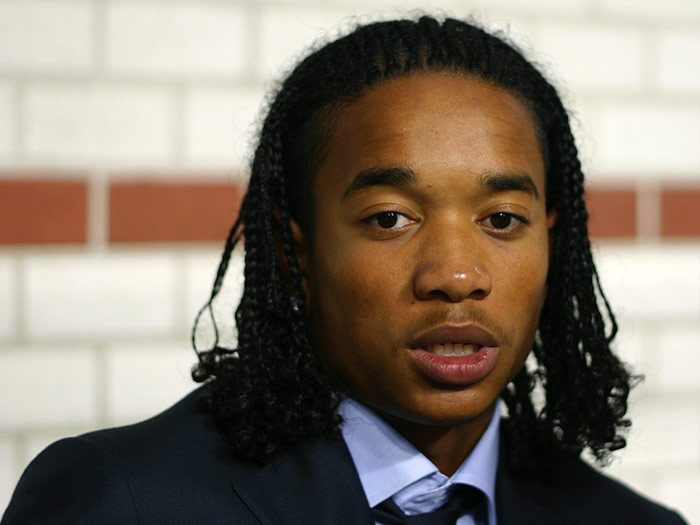
Urby Emanuelson

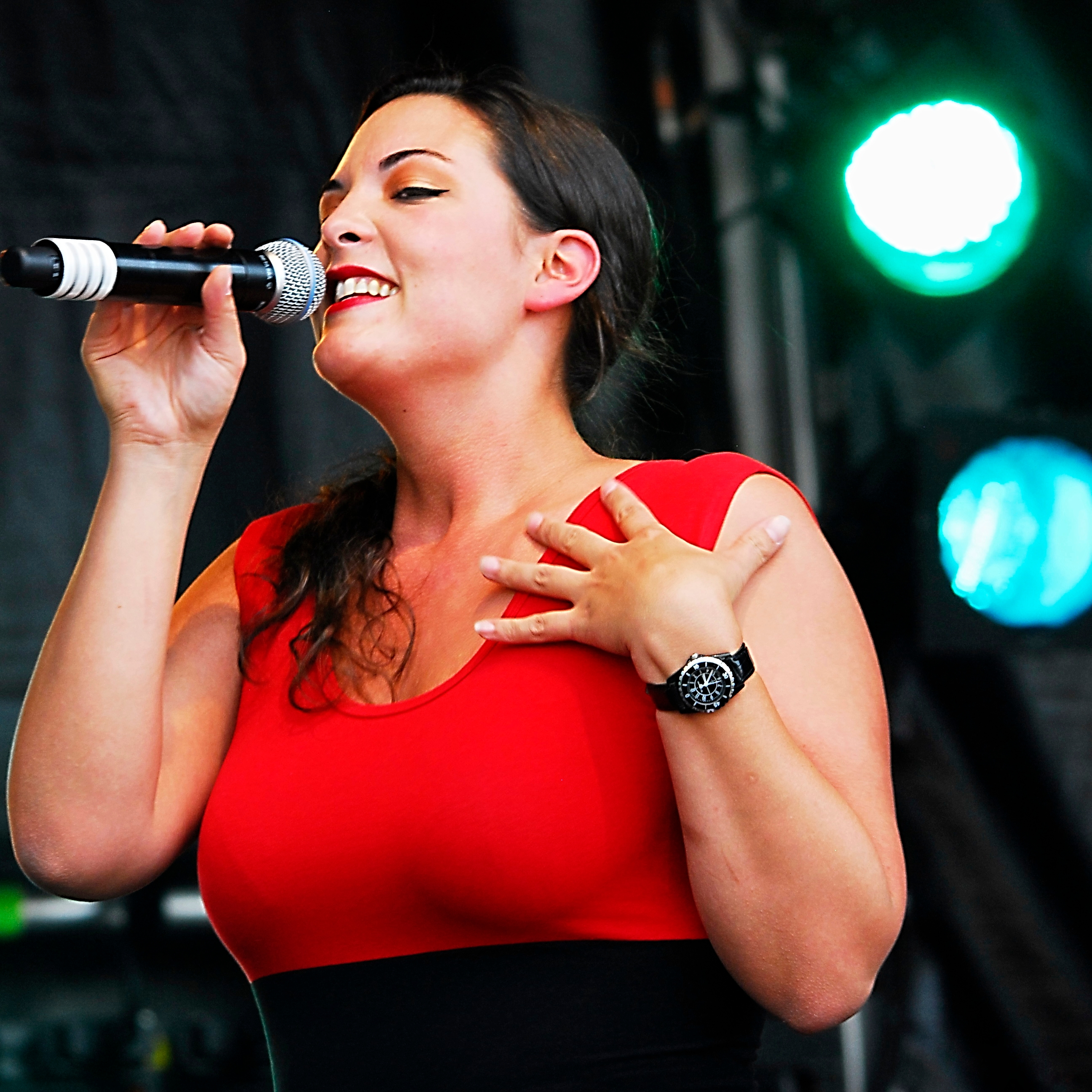
Caro Emerald

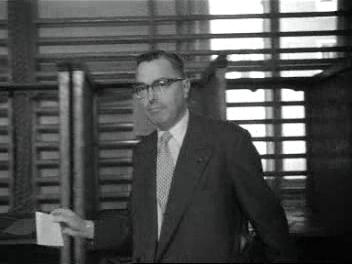
Max Euwe

- Cor Eberhard (born 1947), former politician
- Boy Edgar (1915–1980), jazz conductor, pianist and trumpeter
- Jesse Edwards (born 2000), college basketball player for the Syracuse Orange
- Gerbrand van den Eeckhout (1621–1674), painter
- Esmée van Eeghen (1918–1944), resistance fighter in World War II
- Erick van Egeraat (born 1956), architect
- Remco van Eijden (born 1977), former darts player
- Ger van Elk (1941–2014), created sculptures and painted photographs
- Ferdi Elmas (born 1985), football player
- Harry Elte (1880–1944), architect
- Urby Emanuelson (born 1986), football player
- Caro Emerald (born 1981), pop and jazz singer
- Stephen Emmer (born 1958), composer, arranger, producer and musician
- Joop van den Ende (born 1942), theatrical producer
- Simon Episcopius (1583–1643), theologian and Remonstrant
- Malcolm Esajas (born 1986), football player
- Rudolf Escher (1912–1980), composer and music theorist
- Max Euwe (1901–1981), chess player and mathematician
- Bloeme Evers-Emden (1926–2016), teacher, child psychologist and Holocaust survivor

=== F ===
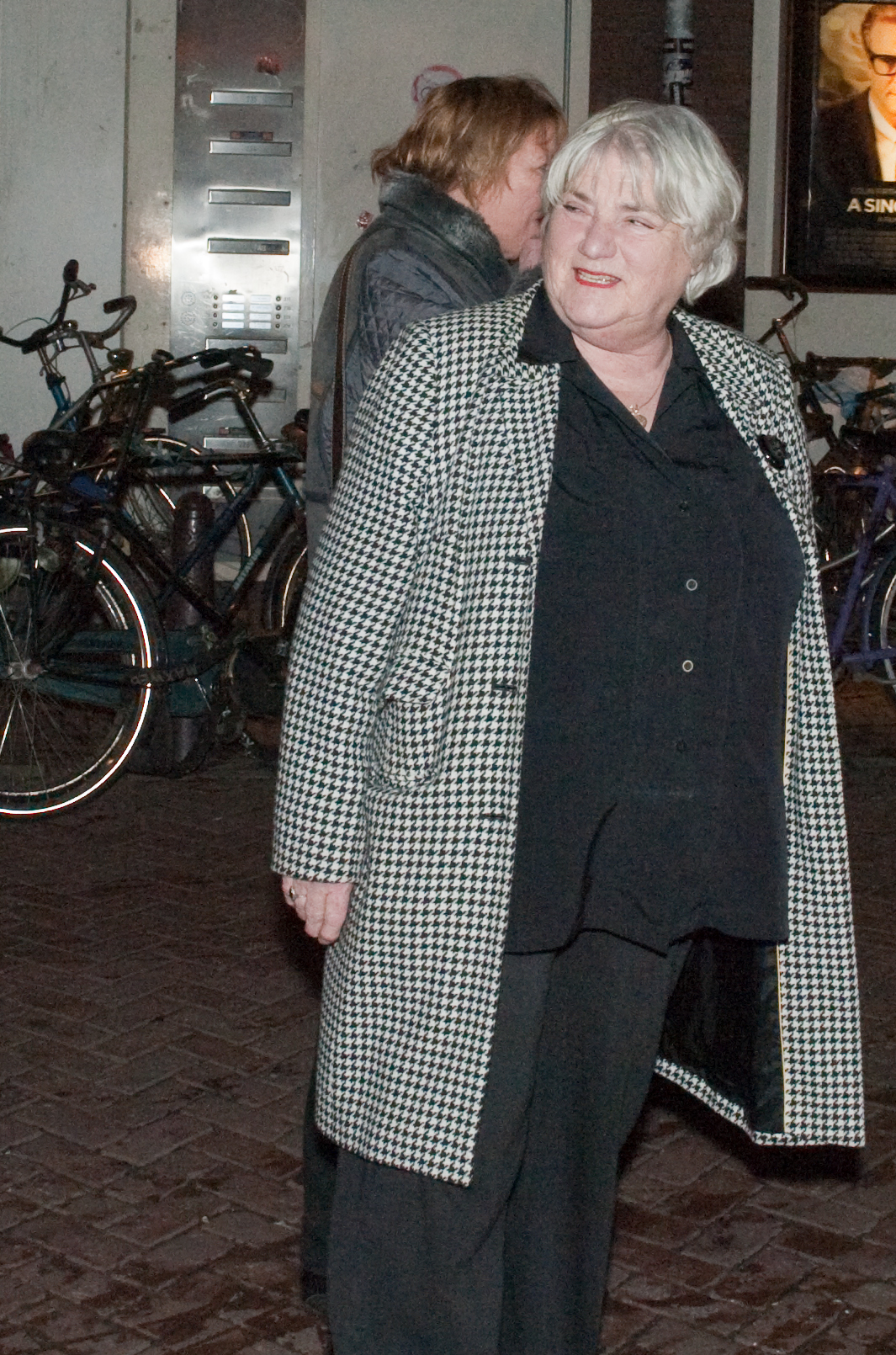
Nelly Frijda

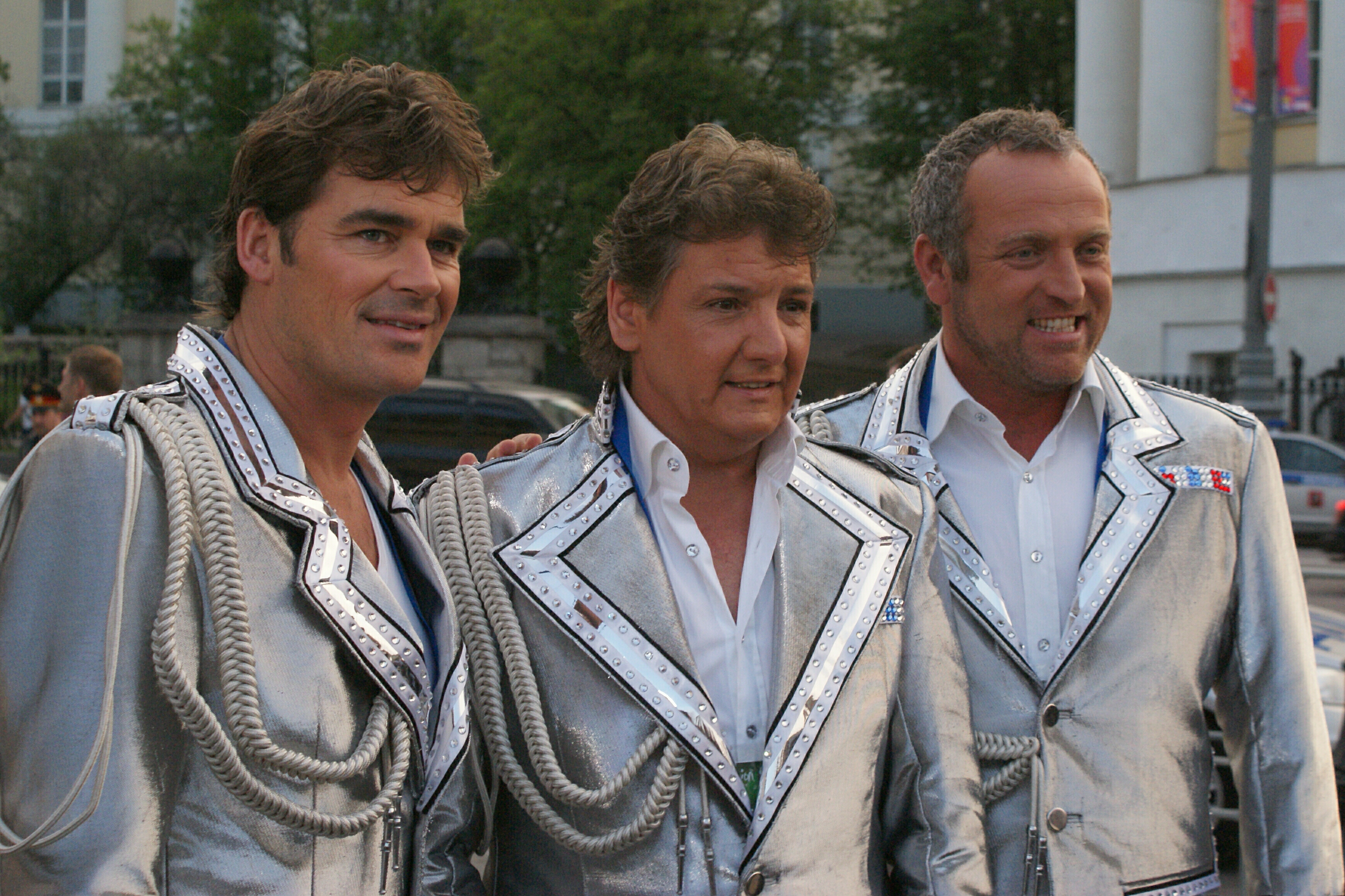
De Toppers in 2009, in the middle: René Froger

- Ina van Faassen (1928–2011), actress and comedian
- Raymond Fafiani (born 1983), football player
- Gino Felixdaal (born 1990), football player
- Kees Fens (1929–2008), writer, essayist and literary critic
- Barthold Fles (1902–1989), literary agent
- George Fles (1908–1939), translator and victim of Stalin's Great Purge
- Melvin Fleur (born 1982), football player
- Lange Frans (born 1980), rapper and TV presenter
- Nelly Frijda (born 1936), actor
- René Froger (born 1960), singer
- Laura Fygi (born 1955), jazz and pop singer

=== G ===
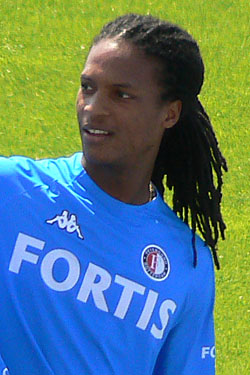
Serginho Greene

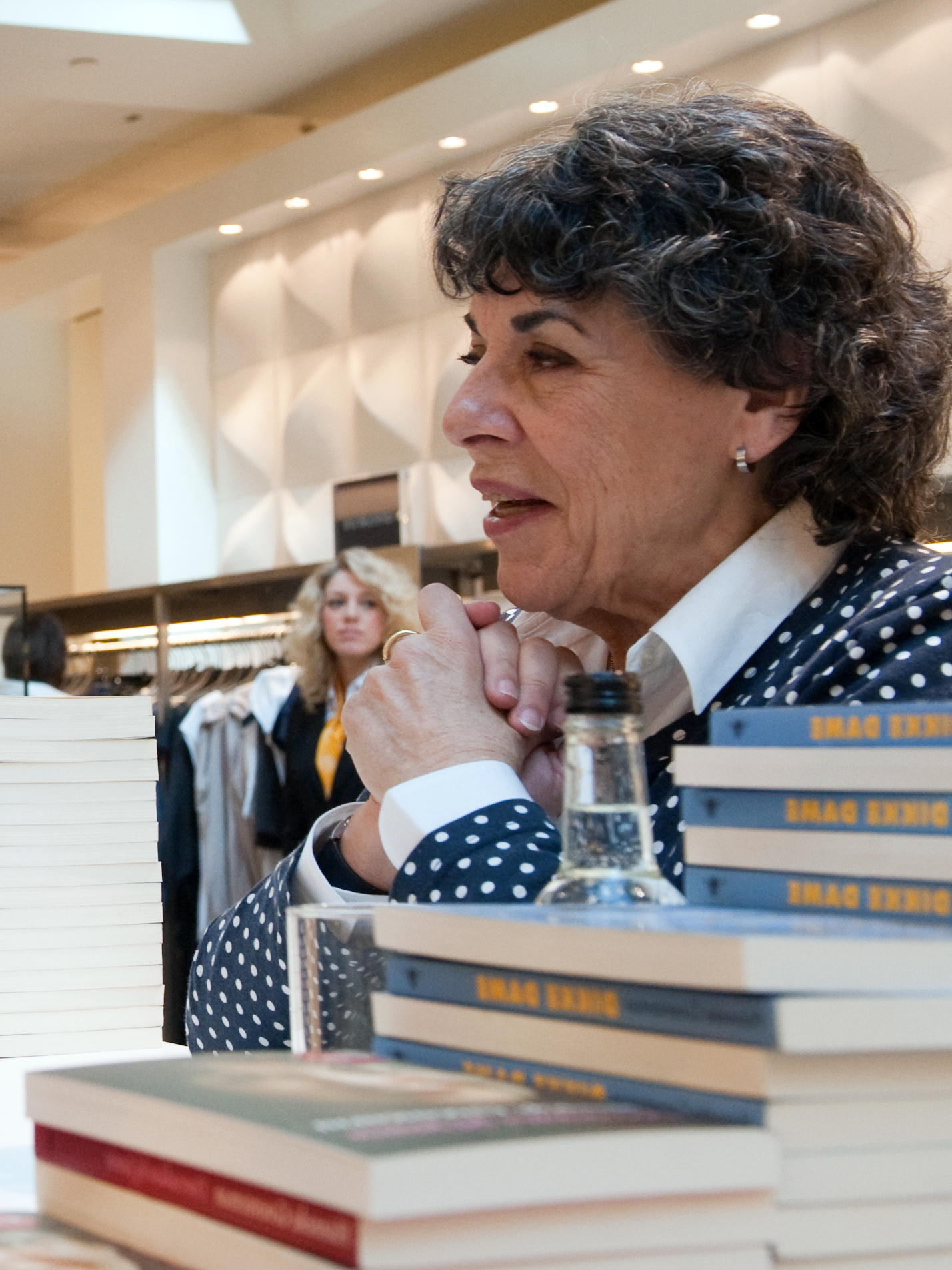
Hanneke Groenteman

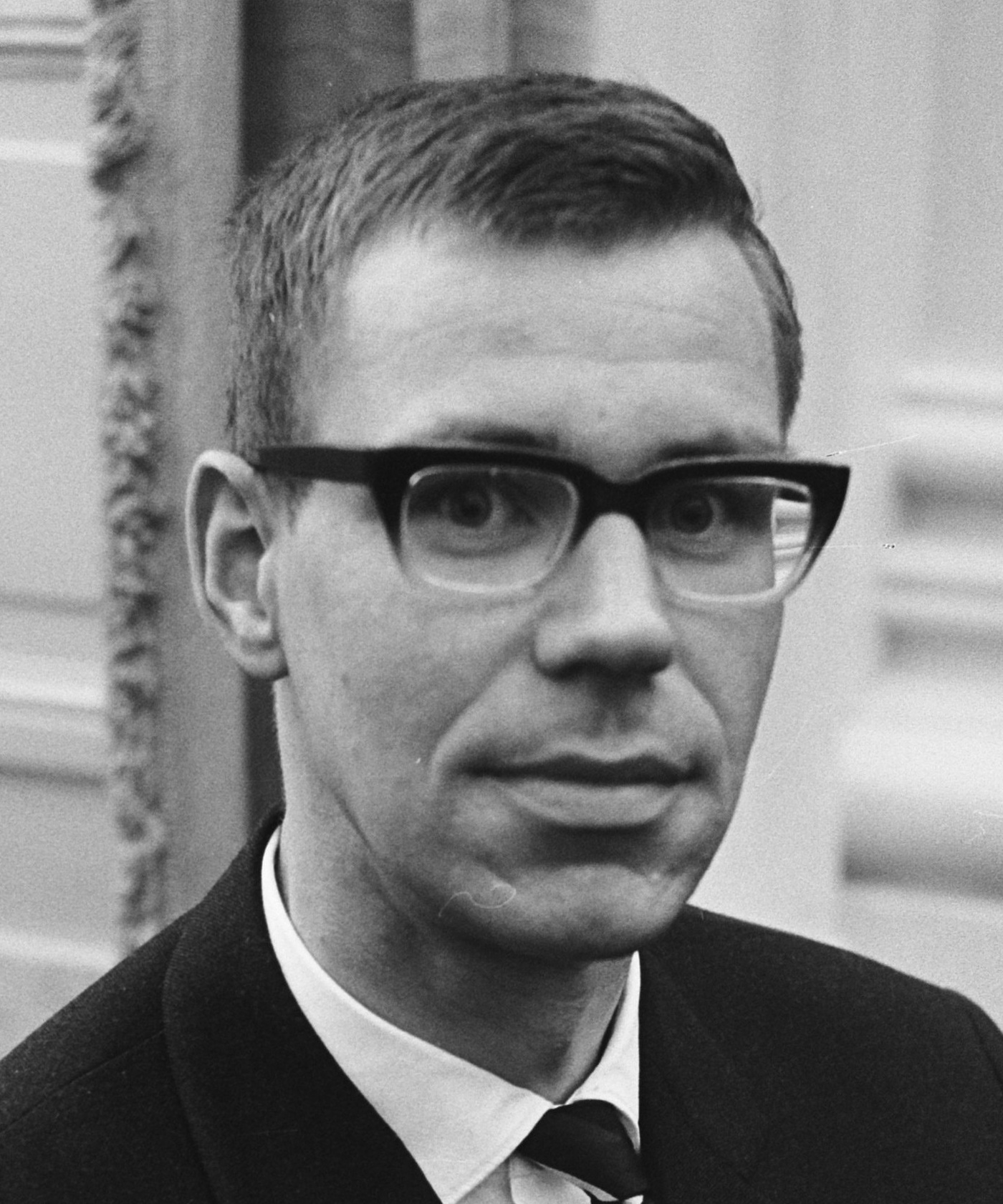
Hans Grosheide, 1963

- Louis van Gaal (born 1951), football trainer
- Tess Gaerthé (born 1991), singer and former child star
- Jacob Geel (1789–1862), scholar, critic and librarian
- Jack van Gelder (born 1950), sport commentator and TV presenter
- Tygo Gernandt (born 1974), actor
- Winston Gerschtanowitz (born 1976), presenter and actor
- Frans Goedhart (1904–1990), journalist, politician and resistance member
- Sim Gokkes (1897–1943), composer
- Carel Goseling (1891–1941), lawyer and politician
- Jasper Gottlieb (born 1989), actor
- Marius Gottlieb (born 1989), actor
- Jetta Goudal (1891–1985), actor
- Thom de Graaf (born 1957), politician and jurist
- Anton P. de Graaff (1928–2008), writer
- Agneta de Graeff van Polsbroek (1603–1656), mother of Wendela Bicker and mother in law of Johan de Witt, Grand Pensionary of Holland
- Andries de Graeff (1611–1678), Amsterdam burgomaster and regent, statesman; uncle of Johan de Witt
- Cornelis de Graeff (1599–1664), Amsterdam burgomaster and regent, statesman, Diplomat; uncle of Johan de Witt
- Dirck Jansz Graeff (1532–1589), Amsterdam burgomaster
- Dirk de Graeff van Polsbroek (1833–1916), diplomat in Japan
- Jacob Dircksz de Graeff (1570–1638), Amsterdam burgomaster and regent, statesman
- Lenaert Jansz de Graeff (around 1525/30-before 1578), one of the leaders of the Protestant Reformation in Amsterdam, captain of the Sea Beggars
- Pieter de Graeff (1638–1707), Amsterdam patrician, politician; brother-in-law of Johan de Witt
- Glennis Grace (born 1978), singer
- Frank de Grave (born 1955), politician and businessman
- Serginho Greene (born 1982), football player
- Didi Gregorius (born 1990), baseball shortstop
- Annemarie Grewel (1935–1998), senator, educator and columnist
- Fred Grim (born 1965), football player (goalkeeper)
- Hanneke Groenteman (born 1939), journalist, radio broadcaster and TV presenter
- Paul de Groot (1899–1986), politicus
- Robert Jasper Grootveld (1932–2009), artist
- Hans Grosheide (1930–2022), politicus
- Ruud Gullit (born 1962), football player
- Henk Guth (1921–2002), artist

=== H ===
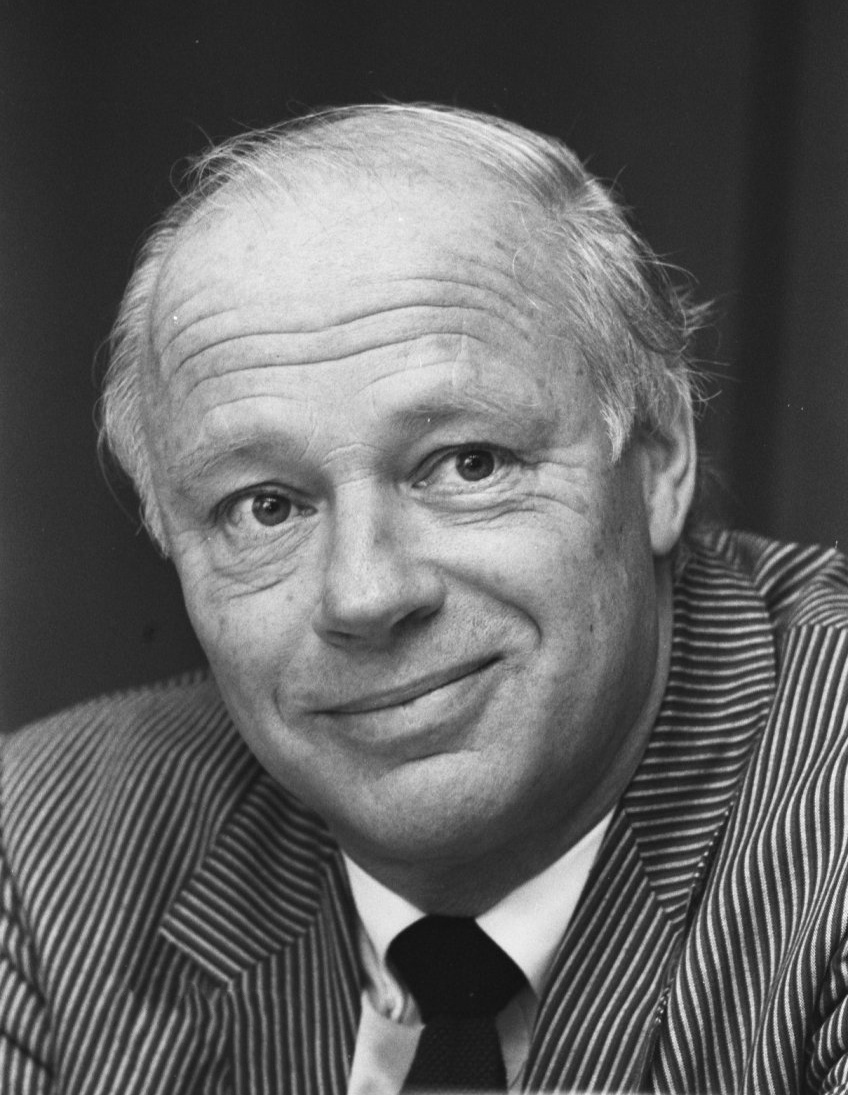
Bernard Haitink, 1984

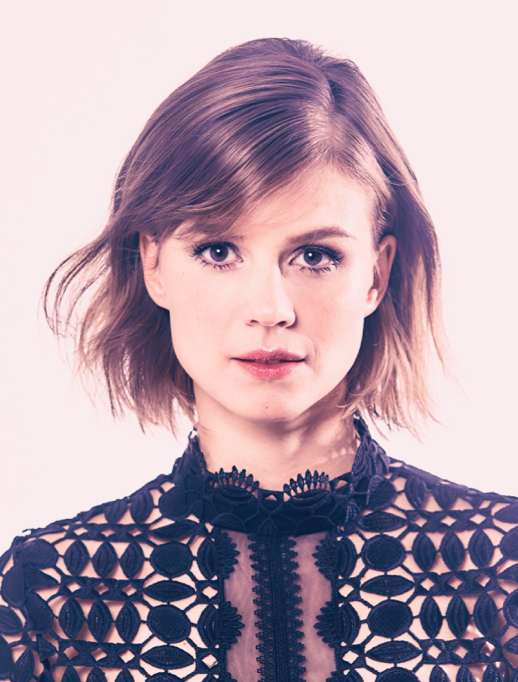
Katja Herbers, 2015

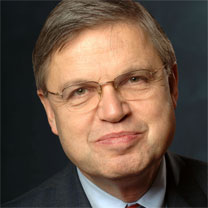
Ernst Hirsch Ballin

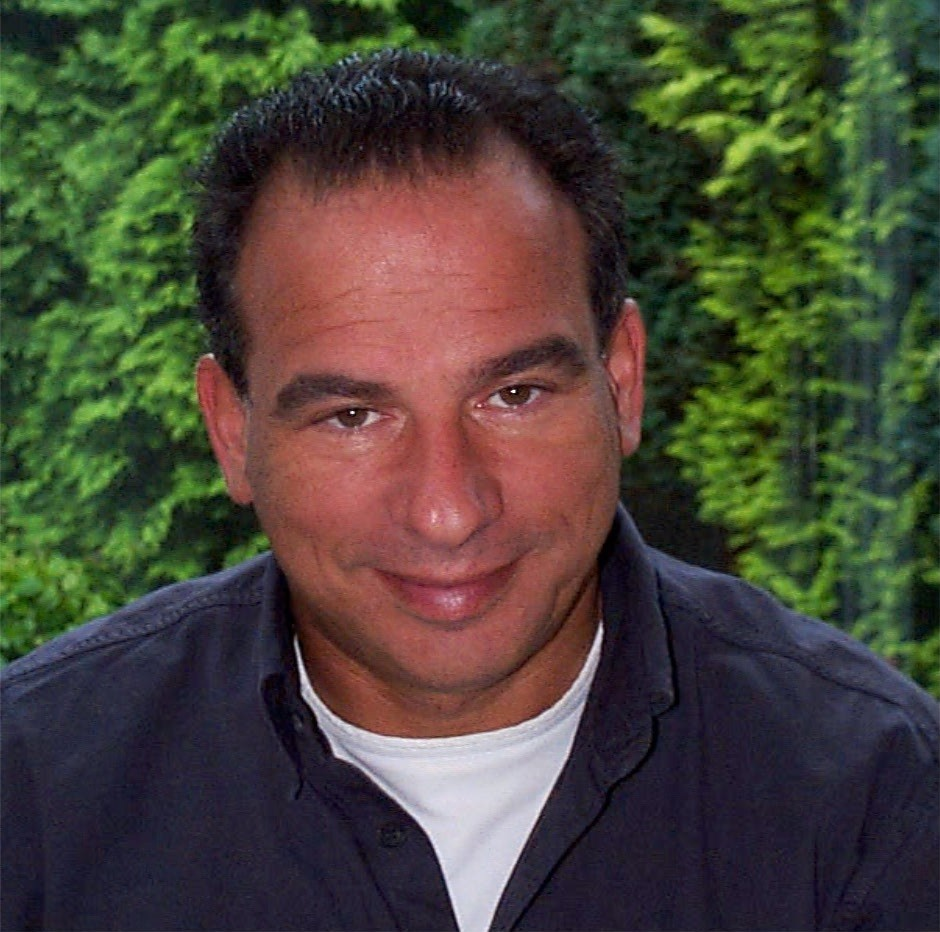
Maurice de Hond

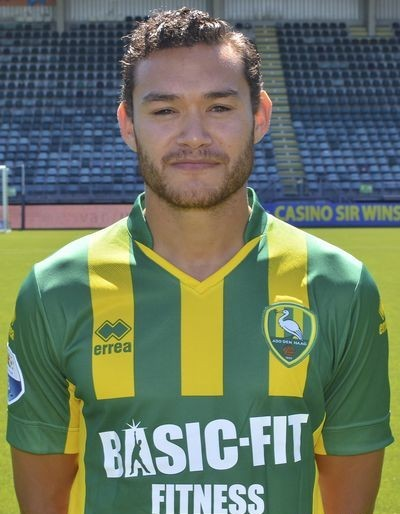
Xander Houtkoop, 2015

- Meijer de Haan (1852–1895), painter
- Bobby Haarms (1934–2009), football player and football trainer
- Cox Habbema (1944–2016), film and TV actress
- Paul Haenen (born 1946), comedian and voice actor
- Bernard Haitink (1929–2021), conductor and violinist
- Alex van Halen (born 1953), American musician and drummer
- Eddie van Halen (1955–2020), American musician and guitar player
- Floris Adriaan van Hall (1791–1866)
- Gijs van Hall (1904–1977), banker, resistance member and mayor of Amsterdam, 1957–1967
- Walraven van Hall (1906–1945), banker and resistance leader
- Boris van der Ham (born 1973), politicus
- Hartog Hamburger (1887–1924), diamond polisher and baseball player
- Mariëtte Hamer (born 1958), politicus
- Simon Hammelburg (1952–2022), entertainer, songwriter, author and journalist
- Otto Hanrath (1882–1944), painter
- Tol Hansse (1940–2002; real name: Hans van Tol)
- Badr Hari (born 1984), kickboxer
- Cor van der Hart (1928–2006), football player and football trainer
- Rob Hartoch (1947–2009), chess master
- Maryam Hassouni (born 1985), actor
- Boy Hayje (born 1949), Formule 1 driver
- André Hazes (1951–2004), singer and actor
- Maaike Head (born 1983), rower
- Jan Heemskerk (1818–1897), politicus
- Johan van Heemskerk (1597–1656), poet
- Theo Heemskerk (1852–1932), politician, prime minister of the Netherlands, 1908–1913
- Simon Heere Heeresma (1932–2011), author and poet
- Pieter Heerma (born 1977), politicus
- Freddy Heineken (1923–2002), businessman
- Pascal Heije (born 1979), football player
- Jérôme Louis Heldring (1917–2013), journalist, columnist and editor
- Sergio Hellings (born 1984), football player
- Jan Frederik Helmers (1767–1813), poet
- Henk Hemsing (1891–1971), Olympic diver
- Maurits Hendriks (born 1961), field hockey goalkeeper and coach
- Marpessa Hennink (born 1964), former model
- Truus Hennipman (born 1943), athlete
- Katja Herbers (born 1980), actor
- Willem Frederik Hermans (1921–1995), author of poetry, novels, short stories, plays
- Herman Hertzberger (born 1932), architect
- Abel Herzberg (1893–1989), lawyer and writer
- Judith Herzberg (born 1934), poet and writer
- Danny Hesp (born 1969), football player
- Catharina Hesterman (1902–1982), Olympic diver
- Jan Hesterman (1893–1963) & Wim Hesterman (1897–1971), Olympic boxers
- Arturo ten Heuvel (born 1978), football player
- John van den Heuvel (born 1962), crime journalist, TV presenter and former police officer
- Ernst Hirsch Ballin (born 1950), retired politician and jurist
- Henk Hoekstra (1924–2009), politician
- Henk Hofstra (1904–1999)
- Willem Holleeder (born 1958), criminal and kidnapper
- Theodor Holman (born 1953), writer
- Marc de Hond (1977–2020), TV presenter, businessman, writer and theatre performer
- Maurice de Hond (born 1947), pollster and entrepreneur
- Pieter Corneliszoon Hooft (1581–1647), historian, poet and playwright
- Micky Hoogendijk (born 1970), actress, presenter, model and photographer
- Jaap de Hoop Scheffer (born 1948), politician, diplomat and lawyer
- Netty van Hoorn (born 1951), film director and producer
- Cor van Hout (1957–2003), criminal and kidnapper
- Xander Houtkoop (born 1989), football player
- Hellen Huisman (1937–2012), voice actor
- Johan van Hulst (1911–2018), university professor, author, politician, chess player and centenarian
- Jan van Huysum (1682–1749), painter
- Henriette Strobel (born 1953), singer and ex-wife of Wolfgang Heichel

=== I ===
- Boudewijn Ietswaart (1936–2010), graphic designer
- Piet Ikelaar (1896–1992), cyclist
- Jeanne Immink (1853–1929), mountaineer
- Rinus Israël (born 1942), football player and football trainer

=== J ===
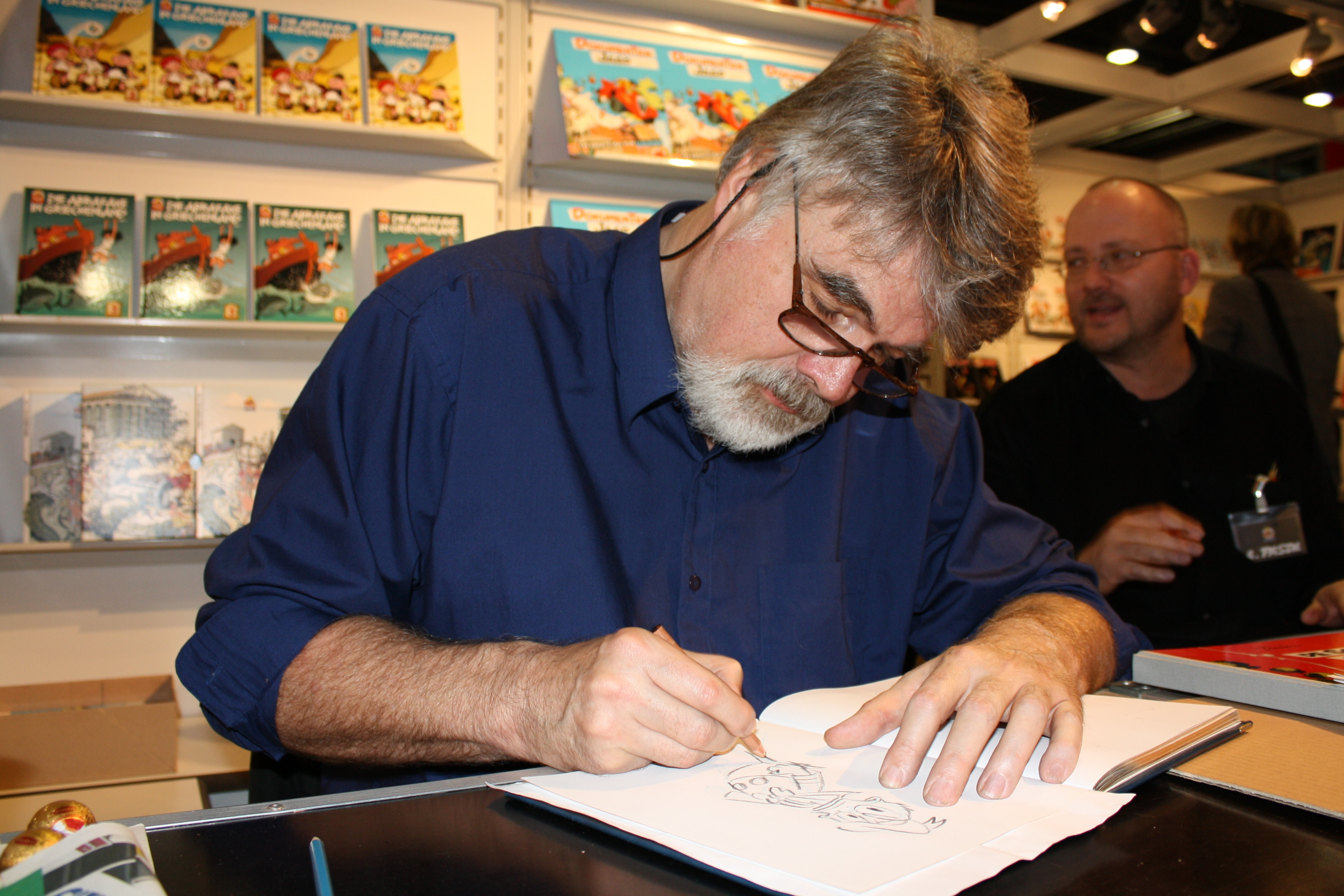
Daan Jippes, 2009

- Binyomin Jacobs (born 1949), rabbi
- Dolf Jansen (born 1963), comedian
- Hans Jansen (1942–2015), politician, scholar of contemporary Islam and author
- Harrie Jansen (born 1947), cyclist
- Huub Jansen (1928–1985)
- Famke Janssen (born 1964), actor
- Cornelis Janssens (1593–1661), English portrait painter
- Daan Jippes (born 1945), cartoonist (comic books)
- Virgall Joemankhan (1968–1989), football player
- Loe de Jong (1914–2005), historian
- Nigel de Jong (born 1984), football player
- Calvin Jong-A-Pin (born 1986), football player
- Jan Jongbloed (born 1940), football player (goalkeeper)
- Wik Jongsma (1943–2008), actor
- Andries Jonker (born 1962), football coach
- Johnny Jordaan (1924–1989), singer of popular music

=== K ===
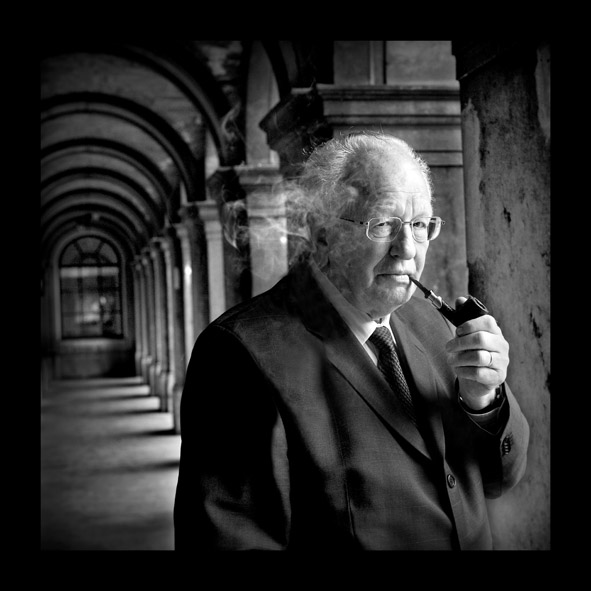
Jos van Kemenade

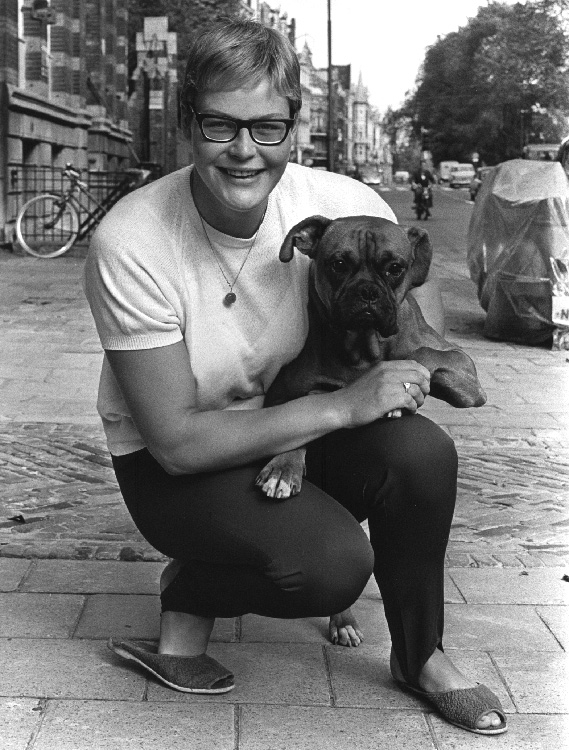
Ada Kok

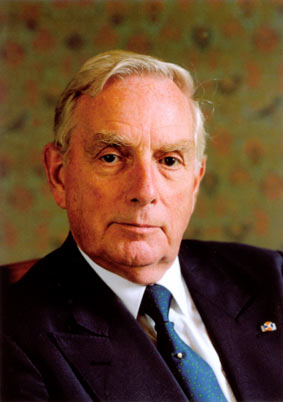
Frits Korthals Altes

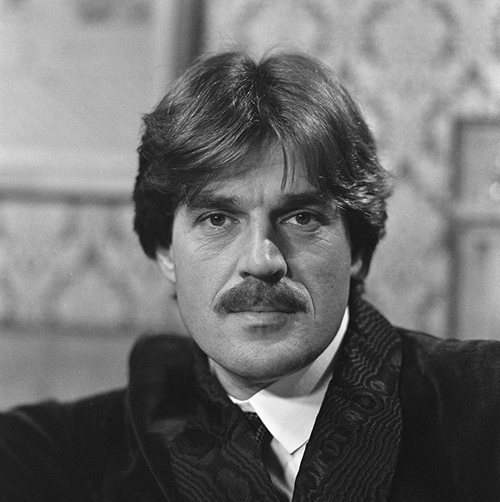
Jeroen Krabbé

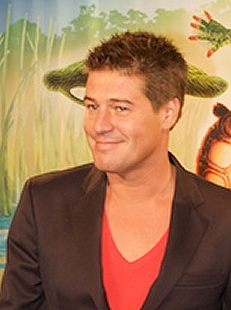
Martijn Krabbé

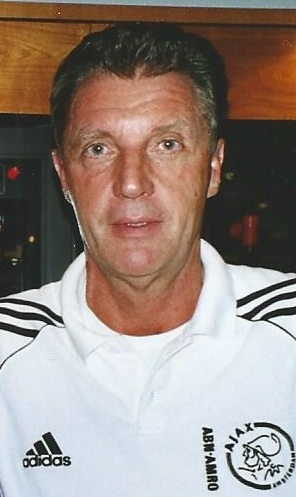
Ruud Krol, 2005

- René Kahn (born 1954), neuropsychiatrist
- Abraham van Karnebeek (1836–1925)
- Piet Keizer (1943–2017), football player
- Sander Keller (born 1979), football player
- Jos van Kemenade (1937–2020), politician
- Jacobus Mattheüs de Kempenaer (1793–1870), politician and lawyer
- Joan Melchior Kemper (1776–1824), politicus
- Hendrik Kerstens (born 1956), photographer, visual artist
- Teun van de Keuken (born 1971), journalist, novelist
- Thomas de Keyser (ca.1596–1667), portrait painter
- Wim Kieft (born 1962), football player
- Pelle Kil (born 1971), Olympic cyclist
- Sharon Kips (born 1983), singer
- Dominique Kivuvu (born 1987), football player
- Karel Klaver (born 1978), hockey player
- Joram van Klaveren (born 1979), politicus
- Gerrit Kleerekoper (1897–1943), gymnastics coach and diamond cutter
- Aart Klein (1909–2001), photographer
- Simone Kleinsma (born 1958), musical theatre actress
- Sam Klepper (1960–2000)
- Michel de Klerk (1884–1923), architect
- Mientje Kling (1894–1966), theatre and film actress and radio personality
- Oger Klos (born 1993), football player
- Patrick Kluivert (born 1976), football player and football coach
- Gerrie Knetemann (1951–2004), cyclist
- Rie Knipscheer (1911–2003), artist
- Milano Koenders (born 1986), football player
- Hermann Friedrich Kohlbrugge (1803–1875), minister and reformed theologian
- Max Kohnstamm (1914–2010), historian and diplomat
- Ada Kok (born 1947), swimmer
- Mimi Kok (1934–2014), film and television actress
- Philips Koninck (1619–1688), landscape painter
- John Körmeling (born 1951)
- Frits Korthals Altes (born 1931), politicus
- Gerrit Kouwenaar (1923–2014), journalist, translator, poet and prose writer
- John Kraaijkamp (1925–2011), actor, comedian and singer
- Jeroen Krabbé (born 1944), actor and film director
- Martijn Krabbé (born 1968), presentator
- Tim Krabbé (born 1943), writer
- Piet Kramer (1881–1961), architect
- Michel Kreek (born 1971), football player
- Ruud Krol (born 1949), football player and football coach
- Ron Kroon (1942–2000), swimmer
- Willy Kruyt (1877–1943), Protestant minister and politician
- Guus Kuijer (born 1942), writer

=== L ===
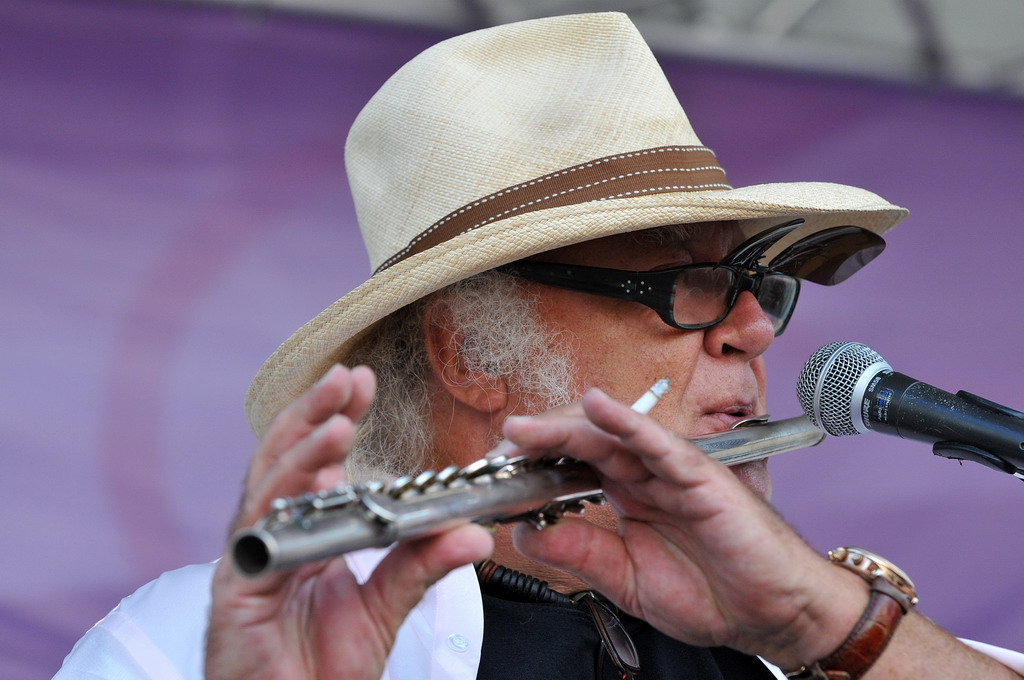
Thijs van Leer in 2010

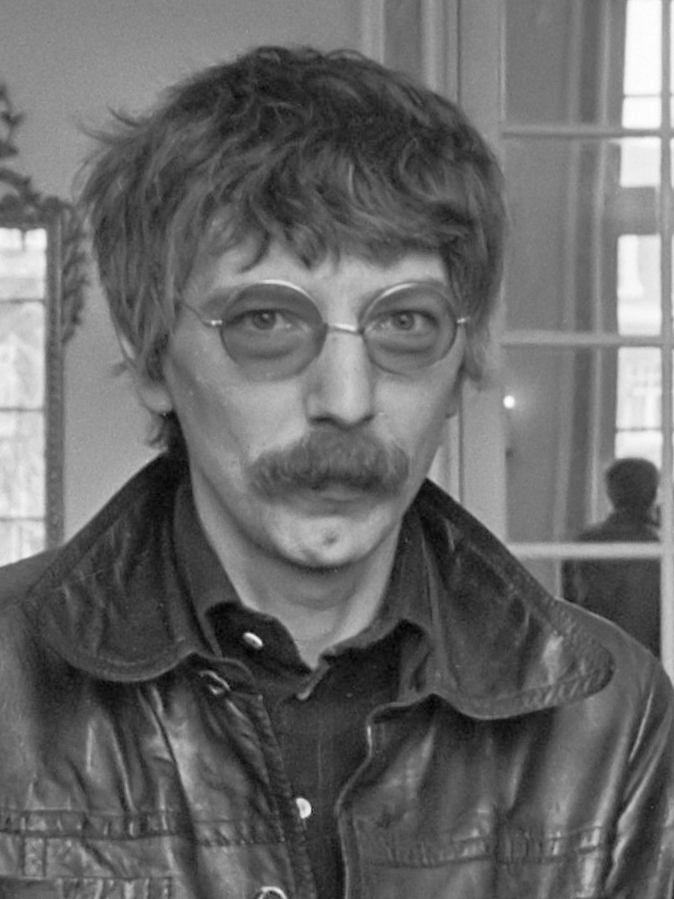
Reinbert de Leeuw, 1976

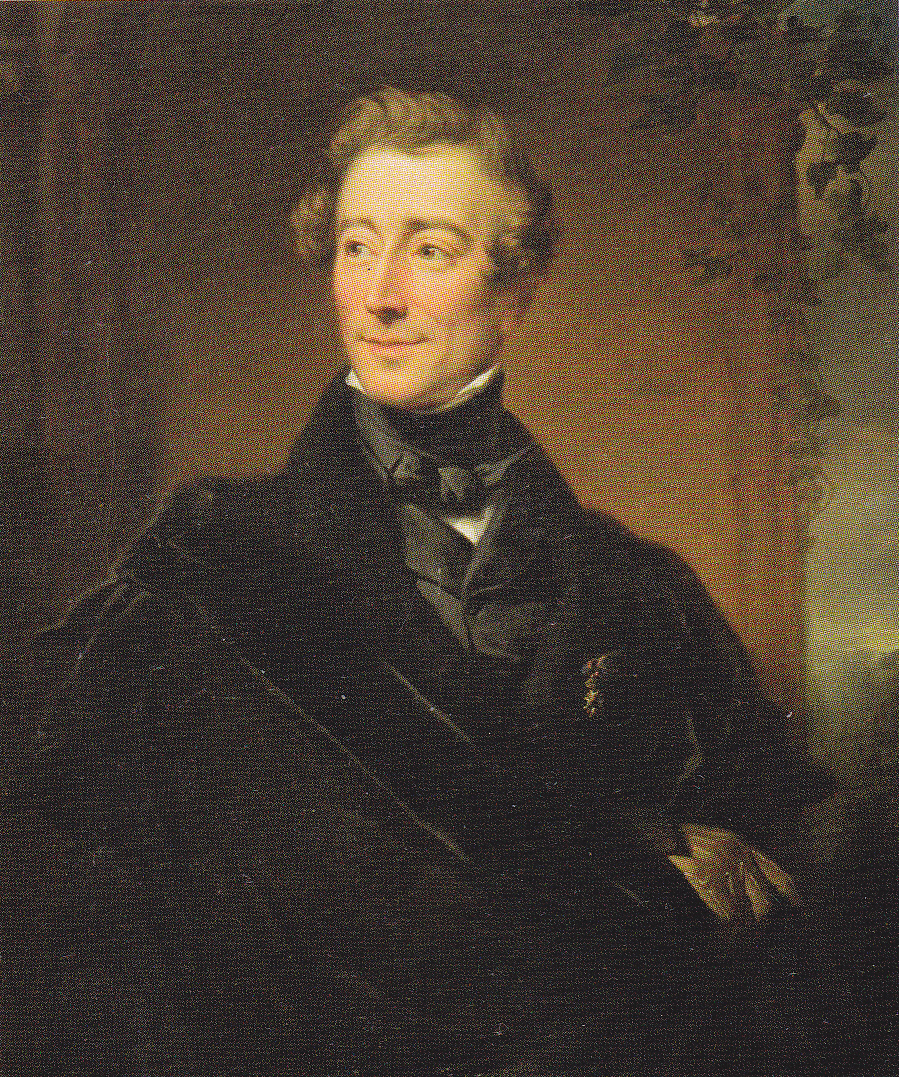
Jacob van Lennep, 1838

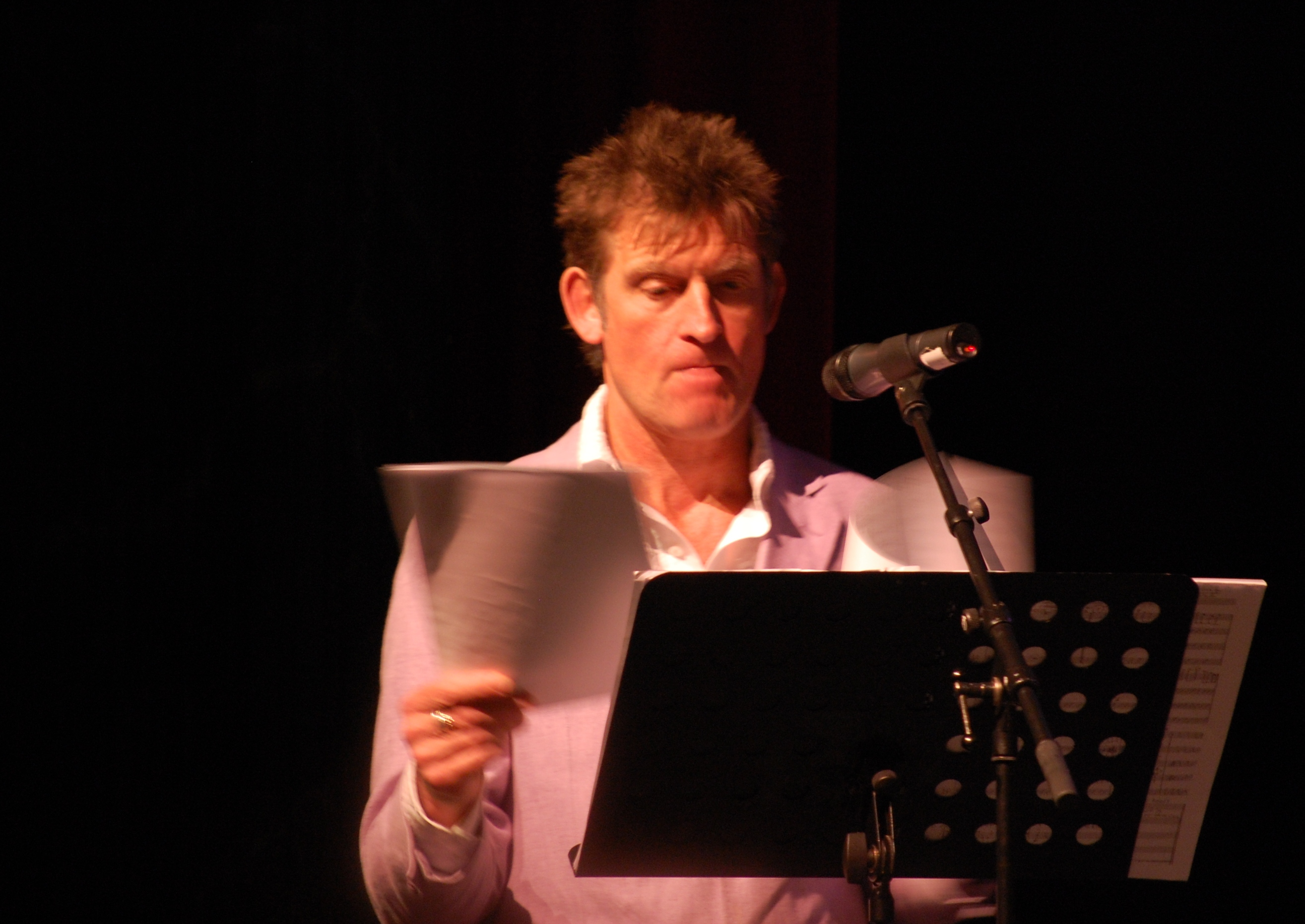
Huub van der Lubbe

- Yvette Laclé (born 1955), local politician and reformed prostitute and drug addict
- Frits Lambrechts (born 1937), actor, musician and cabaret artist
- Michael Lamey (born 1979), football player
- Kim Lammers (born 1981), hockey player
- Denny Landzaat (born 1976), football player
- Arend Langenberg (1949–2012), voice-over, voice actor and radio presenter
- L.A. Raeven (born 1971), arts duo
- Saskia Laroo (born 1959), jazz musician
- Petra Laseur (born 1939), actor
- Thijs van Leer (born 1948), musician, singer-songwriter, composer and producer
- Reinbert de Leeuw (1938–2020), conductor, pianist and composer
- Cornelis Lely (1854–1929), politician and civil engineer
- Gerard van der Lem (born 1952), football player and football coach
- Jacob van Lennep (1802–1868), poet and novelist
- Jeremain Lens (born 1987), football player
- Evert Jan Ligtelijn (1893–1975), painter
- Jan Ligthart (1859–1916), teacher and philosopher
- Pierre van der Linden (born 1946), drummer
- Patricia Linhard (born 1957), politicus
- Dana Lixenberg (born 1964), photographer and filmmaker
- Rifka Lodeizen (born 1972), actor
- Theo Loevendie (born 1930), composer and clarinet player
- Dick Loggere (1921–2014), hockey player
- Joghem van Loghem (1914–2005), professor of internal medicine
- Tyrone Loran (born 1981), football player
- Fajah Lourens (born 1981), actor
- Victor Löw (born 1962; born as Victor Arthur Löwenstein), actor
- Huub van der Lubbe (born 1953), singer and actor
- Eric Lucassen (born 1974), politicus
- Lucebert (1924–1994), artist and poet of the COBRA art movement
- Gijs Luirink (born 1983), football player
- Charly Luske (born 1978), singer and actor
- Joris Luyendijk (born 1971), journalist

=== M ===
- Maarten Maartens (1858–1915), writer
- Nol Maassen (1922–2009), politician
- Calvin Mac-Intosch (born 1989), football player
- Sherjill MacDonald (born 1984), football player
- Fien de la Mar (1898–1965), actress and cabaret performer
- Angelo Martha (born 1982), football player
- Bentinho Massaro (born 1988/1989), online New Age guru and alleged cult founder
- Clous van Mechelen (born 1942; real name: Jack Phillip van Mechelen)
- Eduard Meijer (1878–1929), swimmer
- Ischa Meijer (1943–1995), journalist, TV and radio presenter, critic and author
- Jan Meijer (1921–1993), athlete
- Johnny Meijer (1912–1992), accordionist who played classical, folk, and swing
- Mario Melchiot (born 1976), football player
- Joseph Mendes da Costa (1863–1939), sculptor and teacher
- Hursut Meric (born 1983), football player
- Edward Metgod (born 1959), football player (goalkeeper) and football trainer
- John Metgod (born 1958), football player and football trainer
- Frits Meuring (1882–1973), Olympic freestyle swimmer
- Lodewijk Meyer (1629–1681), physician, classical scholar, lexicographer and playwright
- Rinus Michels (1928–2005), football player and football trainer
- John Mieremet (1960–2005), underworld figure associated with extortion and assassination
- Lion van Minden (1880–1944), Olympic fencer who was killed in the Auschwitz concentration camp
- Albert Mol (1917–2004), actor
- Frans Molenaar (1940–2015)
- Michael Mols (born 1970), football player
- Rik Moorman (born 1961), cyclist
- Ibad Muhamadu (born 1982), football player
- Fred Mulders (1911–1960), guitarist
- Paul Mulders (born 1981), football player
- Bennie Muller (born 1938), football player
- Robin Muller van Moppes (born 1984), football player
- Danny de Munk (born 1970), actor, singer, musical actor and former child star

=== N ===
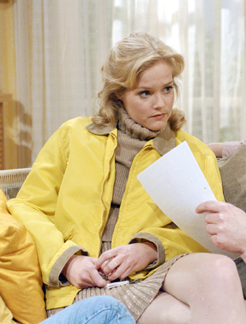
Guusje Nederhorst

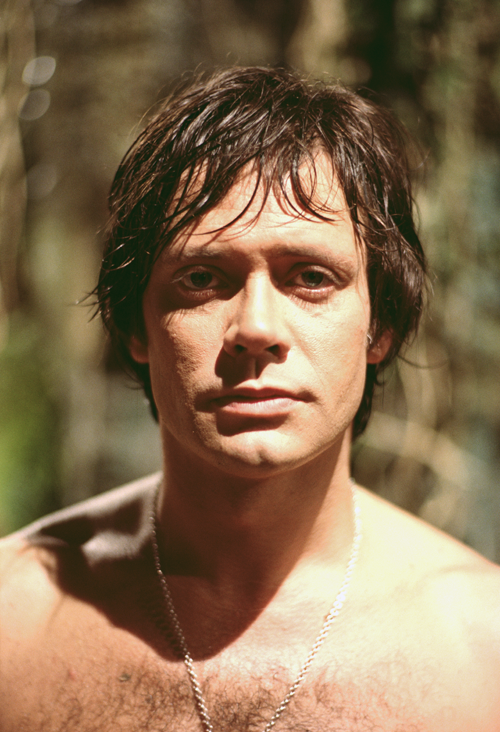
Rob de Nijs

- Jan Nagel (born 1939), politician
- Guusje Nederhorst (1969–2004), actress and singer
- Aert van der Neer (ca.1603–1677), landscape painter
- Eglon van der Neer (ca. 1635–1703), painter
- Gregory Nelson (born 1988), football player
- Helma Neppérus (born 1950), politician, former tax inspector and rower
- Daan Nieber (born 1980), journalist
- Ivo Niehe (born 1946), radio and TV presenter, TV producer and actor
- Matthijs van Nieuwkerk (born 1960), journalist and TV presenter
- Rob de Nijs (born 1942), singer and actor
- Reinier Nooms (1623–1688), maritime painter
- Bob Noorda (1927–2010), graphic designer, worked in Milan
- Saskia Noorman-den Uyl (born 1946), former politician
- Lea Nordheim (1903–1943), gymnast

=== O ===
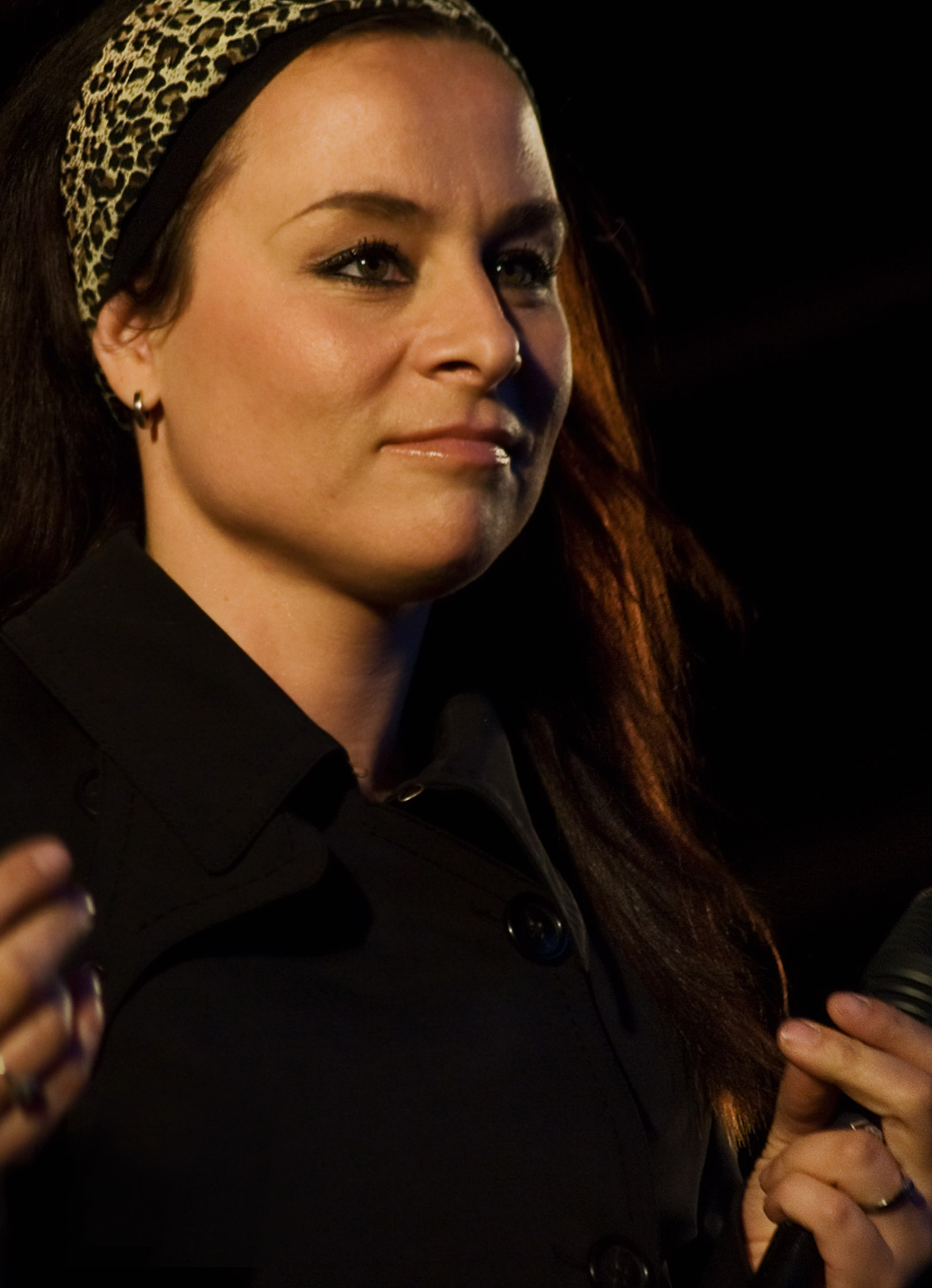
Trijntje Oosterhuis

- Simon Okker (1881–1944), Olympic fencer killed in the Auschwitz concentration camp
- Tom Okker (born 1944), tennis player; world #3
- Jacob Olie (1834–1905), photographer
- Sam Olij (1900–1975), Olympic heavyweight boxer
- Janus Ooms (1866–1924), rower
- Piet Ooms (1884–1961), swimmer
- Huub Oosterhuis (1933–2023), theologian and poet
- Tjeerd Oosterhuis (born 1971), musician, songwriter and producer
- Trijntje Oosterhuis (born 1973), singer-songwriter
- André Ooijer (born 1974), football player
- Jan Oostenbrink (1936–2025), politician
- Dave Osei (born 1983), Dutch-Ghanaian footballer
- Rogier van Otterloo (1941–1988), composer and conductor
- Gonny van Oudenallen (born 1957), creative director, former politician
- Rob Oudkerk (born 1955), politician and general practitioner
- Alistair Overeem (born 1980), MMA fighter

=== P ===
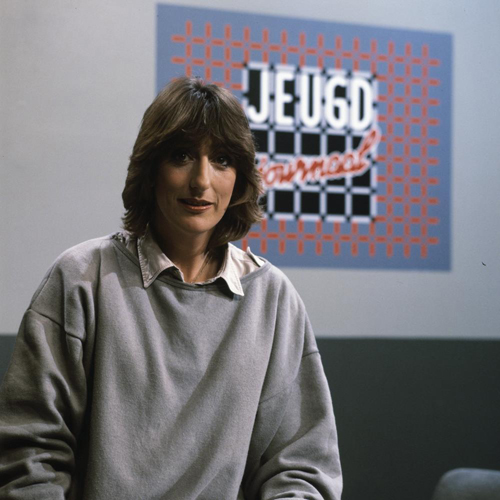
Marga van Praag, 1984

- Max Pam (born 1946), Australian photographer
- Ans Panhorst-Niesink (1918–2010), Olympics discus thrower
- David Pardo, 17th-century rabbi
- Ted van der Parre (born 1955), former strongman
- Pieter Pauw (1564–1617), botanist and anatomist
- Vera Pauw (born 1963), football player and football coach
- Marcel Peeper (born 1965), football player
- Jaap Penraat (1918–2006), resistance fighter during the Second World War
- Peter Piekos (1918–2000), voice actor
- Johanna Pieneman (1889–1986), artist
- Nicolaas Pierson (1839–1909)
- Eddy Pieters Graafland (1934–2020), football player (goalkeeper)
- Mitchell Piqué (born 1979), football player
- Henk Pleket (1937–2011), singer (de Havenzangers)
- Glynor Plet (born 1987), football player
- Hans Plomp (born 1944)
- Rydell Poepon (born 1987), football player
- Frans Pointl (1933–2015), writer
- Clairy Polak (born 1956)
- Henri Polak (1868–1943), trade unionist and politician
- Wim Polak (1924–1999), politician
- René Ponk (born 1971), football player (goalkeeper)
- Henk Poort (born 1956), actor and singer, mainly in operas and musicals
- Ine Poppe (born 1960), artist, journalist and writer
- Henk Portengen (born 1948), speed skater
- Ella van Poucke (born 1994), cellist
- Marga van Praag (born 1946), journalist and TV presenter
- Michael van Praag (born 1947), football administrator and former referee
- Benno Premsela (1920–1997), designer, visual artist and art collector
- Gerard Prent (born 1954), contemporary painter
- Jacques Presser (1899–1970), historian, writer and poet
- Anduele Pryor (born 1985), football player

=== Q ===
- Paul Quasten (born 1985), football player
- Emanuel Querido (1871–1943), bookseller and publisher
- Israël Querido (1872–1932), writer
- Huibert Quispel (1906–1995), navy officer

=== R ===
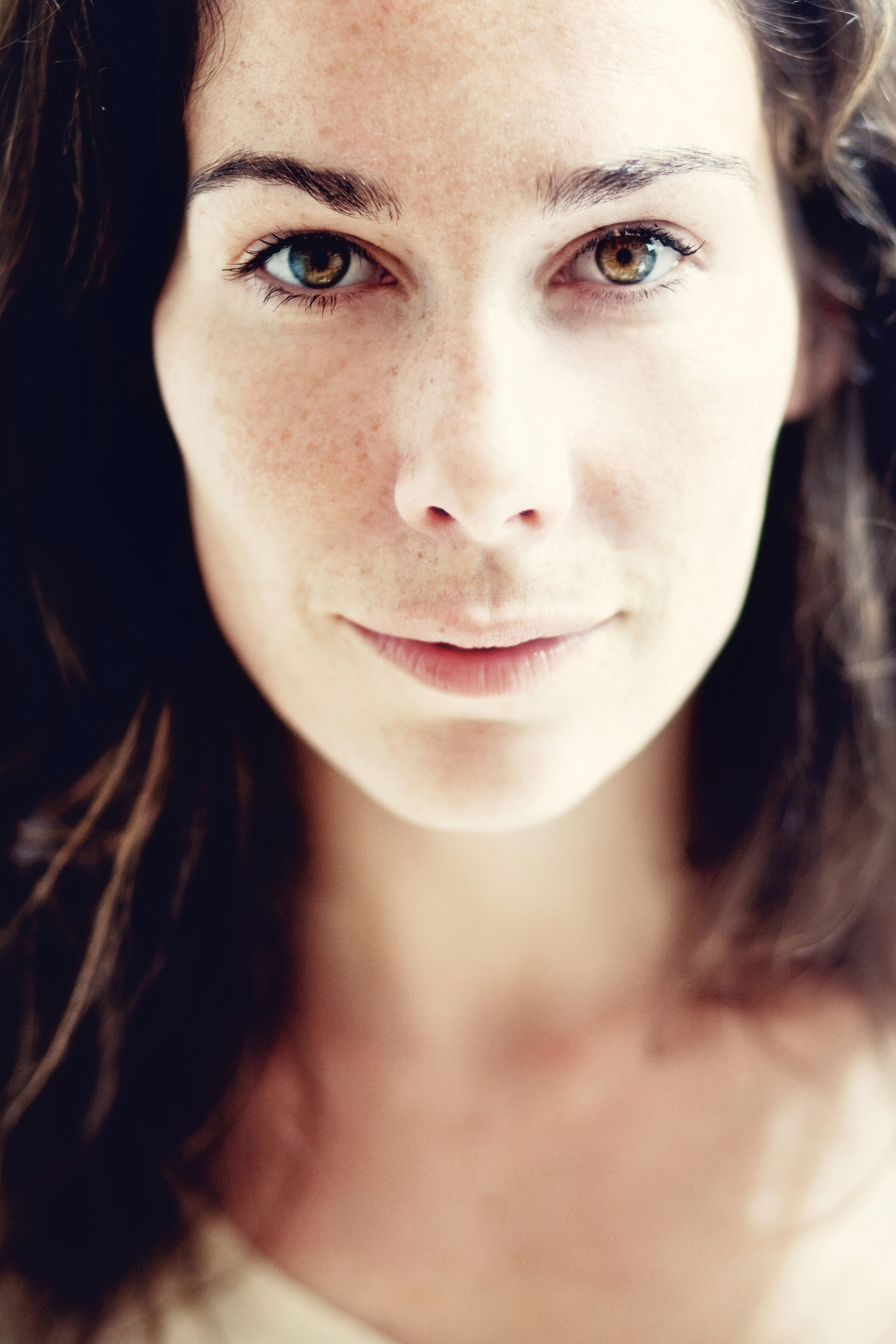
Halina Reijn

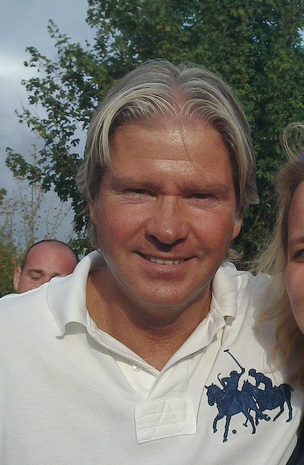
Dries Roelvink

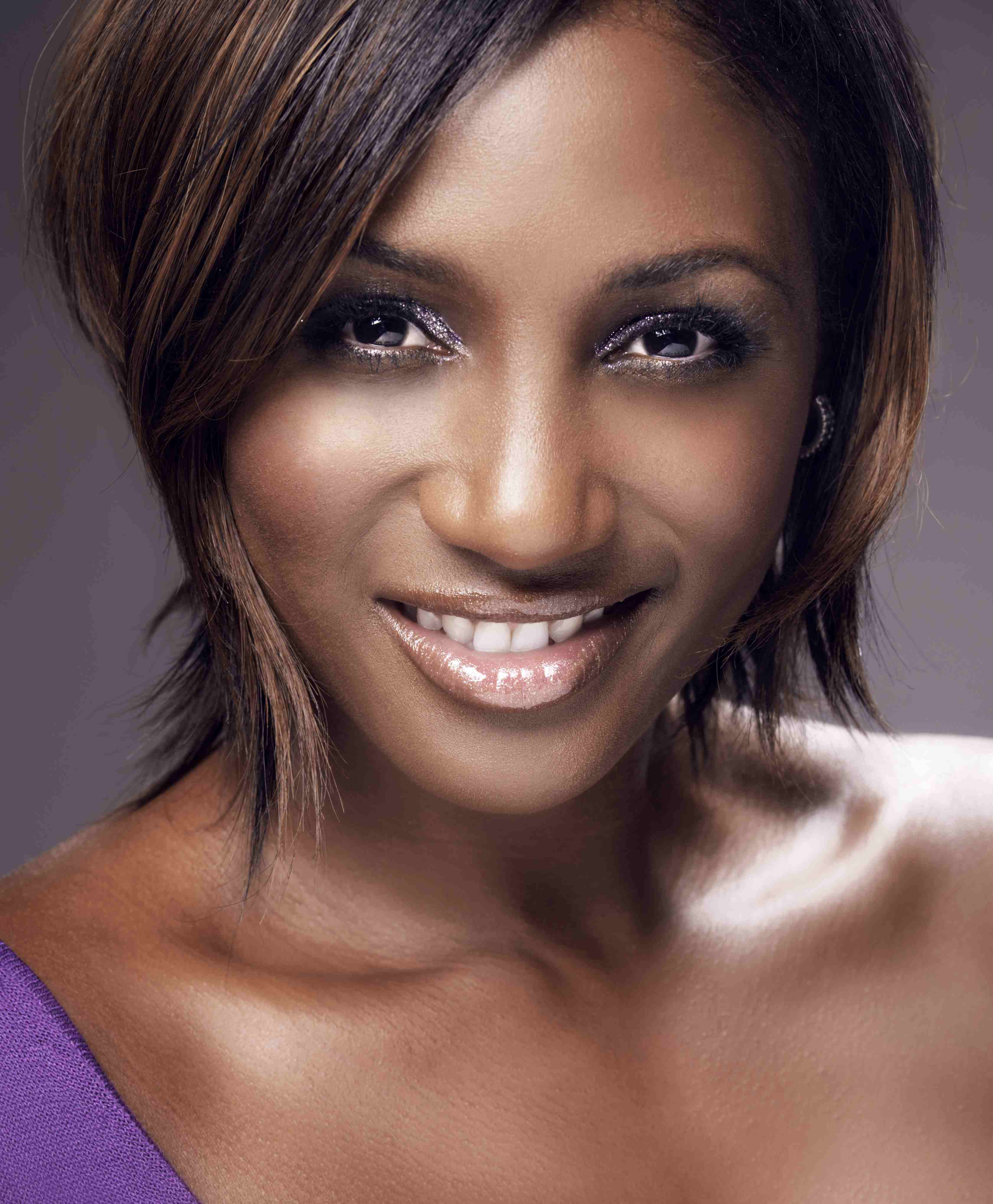
Edsilia Rombley

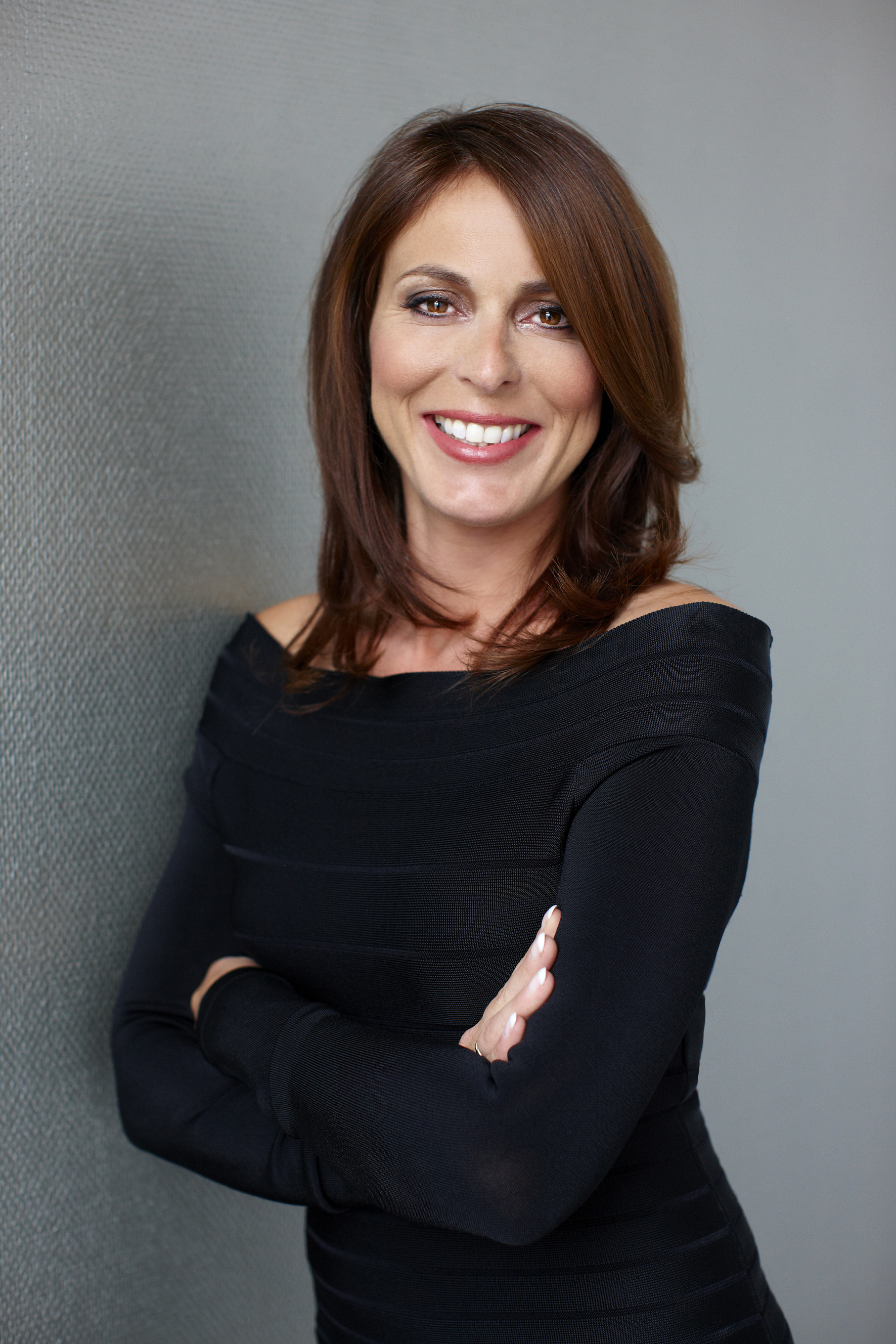
Heleen van Royen

- Jörgen Raymann (born 1966), cabaretier, stand-up comedian, actor and presenter
- Givairo Read (born 2006), football player
- Halina Reijn (born 1975), actor
- Victor Reinier (born 1963), actor
- Patricia Remak (born 1965), politician
- Martijn Reuser (born 1975), football player
- Gerard (van het) Reve (1923–2006), writer
- Karel van het Reve (1921–1999), writer, translator and literary historian on Russian literature
- Daniël de Ridder (born 1984), football player
- Mark Rietman (born 1960), film actor
- Maceo Rigters (born 1984), football player
- Frank Rijkaard (born 1962), football player and football coach
- Johnny Roeg (1910–2003), footballer, striker for Ajax
- Dries Roelvink (born 1959), singer
- Edsilia Rombley (born 1978), singer
- Piet Römer (1928–2012), actor
- Thijs Römer (born 1978), actor
- Raymond de Roon (born 1952), politician
- Willem Rooseboom (1843–1920), Major General and politician
- Florentine Rost van Tonningen (1914–2007), Nazi collaborator
- Felix Rottenberg (born 1957), politician
- Bryan Roy (born 1970), football player
- Heleen van Royen (born 1965), novelist and columnist
- Bert Ruiter (1946–2022), musician
- Wim Ruska (1940–2015), Olympic judoka medallist
- An Rutgers van der Loeff (1910–1990), writer of children's novels

=== S ===
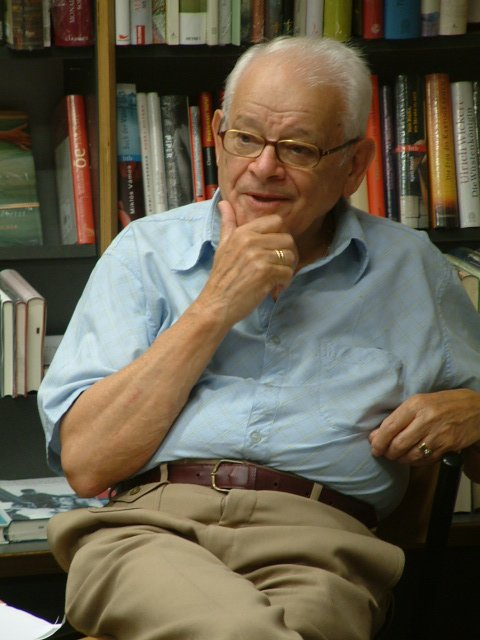
Jules Schelvis

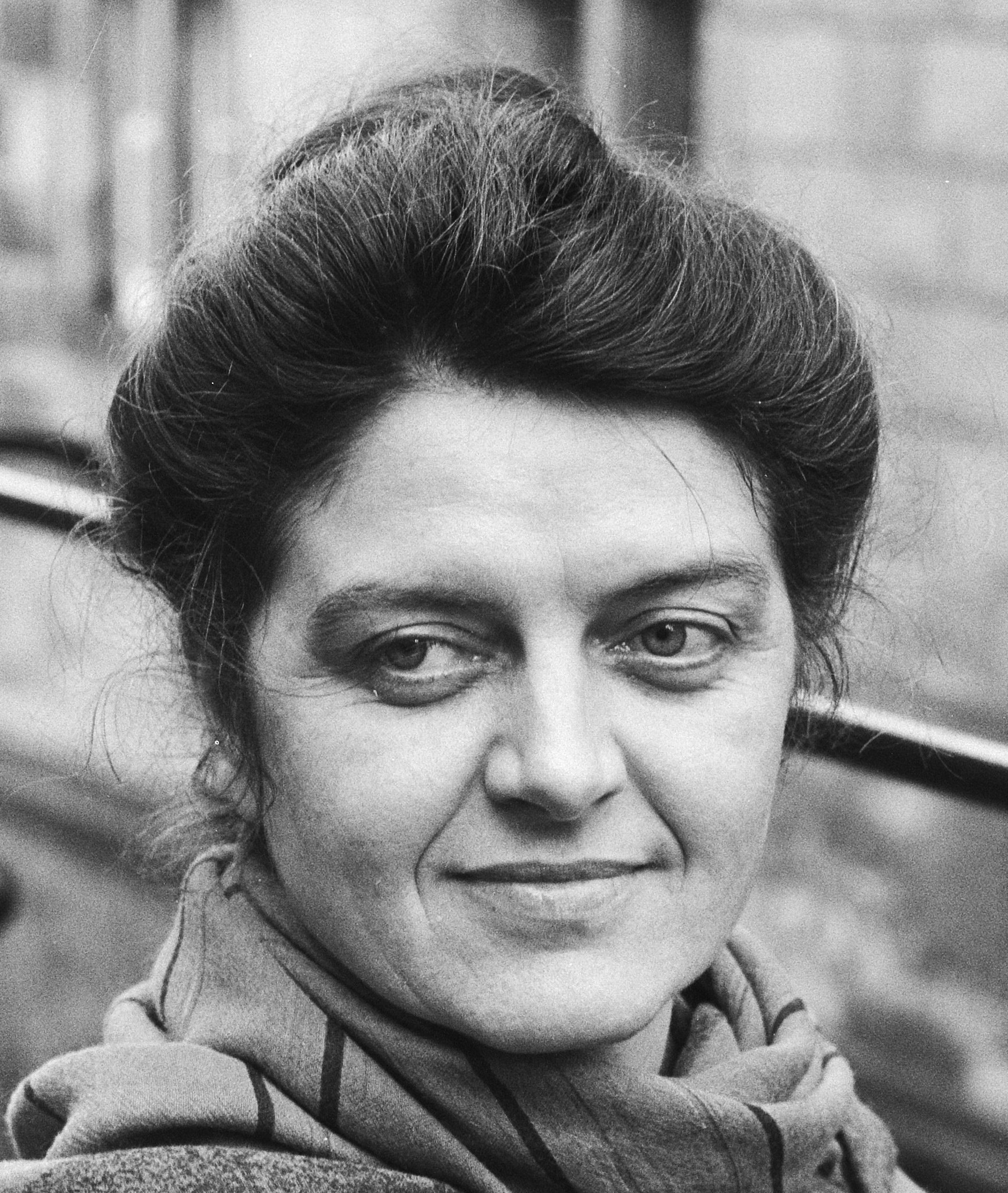
Eegje Schoo

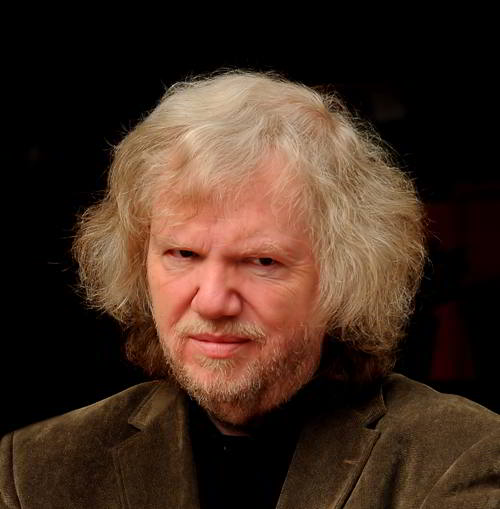
Ton Sijbrands

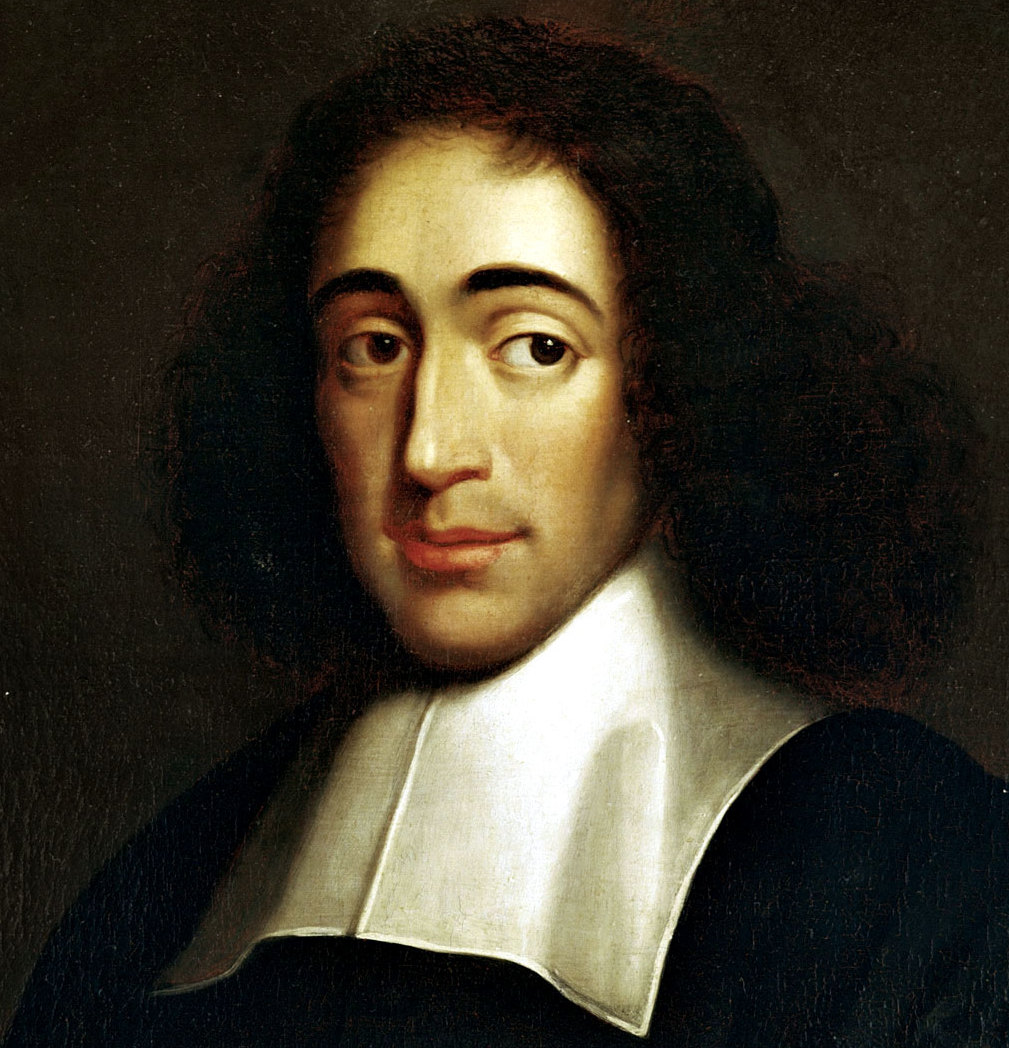
Baruch Spinoza, 1665

- Mady Saks (1941–2006), film director
- Jamile Samuel (born 1992), athlete
- Jeffrey Sarpong (born 1988), football player
- Jan Schaefer (1940–1994), politician
- Ruben Schaken (born 1982), football player
- Jules Schelvis (1921–2016), Jewish historian and Holocaust survivor
- Danny Schenkel (born 1978), football player
- Wouter Schievink (born 1963), neurosurgeon
- Anton van Schijndel (born 1960), politician
- Gerrit Schimmelpenninck (1794–1863), businessman and politician
- Luud Schimmelpennink (born 1935), politicus
- Jan Schokking (1864–1941), politician and Christian minister
- Wim Schokking (1900–1960), politician
- Rob Scholte (born 1958), contemporary artist
- Gabe Scholten (1921–1997), athlete
- Eegje Schoo (born 1944), politician
- Hendrik Jan Schoo (1945–2007), author, journalist and magazine editor
- Thomas Schoorel (born 1989), tennis player
- Wim Schut (1920–2006), politician
- Wil Schuurman (born 1943), politician
- Thérèse Schwartze (1851–1918), portrait painter
- Charl Schwietert (born 1943), journalist, writer and politician
- Orlow Seunke (born 1952), director, screenwriter and producer
- Gerson Sheotahul (born 1987), football player
- Jan Sierhuis (born 1928), painter
- Ton Sijbrands (born 1949), international draughts player
- Xavi Simons (born 2003), football player
- Khalid Sinouh (born 1975), former professional football goalkeeper
- Denzel Slager (born 1993), football player
- Hans Sleeswijk (1935–2024), sailor and producer
- Philip Slier (1923–1943), typesetter
- Bob Smalhout (1927–2015), physician, professor and author
- Floortje Smit (born 1983), singer
- A.L. Snijders (1937–2021), writer
- Genaro Snijders (born 1989), football player
- Ben Sombogaart (born 1947), film and TV director
- Haya van Someren (1926–1980), politician
- Karin Spaink (born 1957), journalist, writer and feminist
- Baruch Spinoza (1632–1677), philosopher
- Ben Springer (1897–1960), draughts player
- Michael Stein (1935–2009), journalist
- Thérèse Steinmetz (born 1933), singer and actor
- Floris Stempel (1877–1910), first chairman of football club Ajax Amsterdam
- Ernst Stern (1926–2007), Romanian-German scenic designer
- Co Stompé (born 1962), former professional darts player
- Frans Stoppelman (1921–2007), photographer
- Tina Strobos (1920–2012), psychiatrist and World War II resistance hero
- Louis Stuyt (1914–2000), politician
- Ko Suurhoff (1905–1967), politician
- Jan Swammerdam (1637–1680), biologist and microscopist
- Sjaak Swart (born 1938), football player
- Hans van Swol (1914–2010), tennis player
- Joyce Sylvester (born 1965), politicus
- Zsolt Szabó (born 1961)

=== T ===
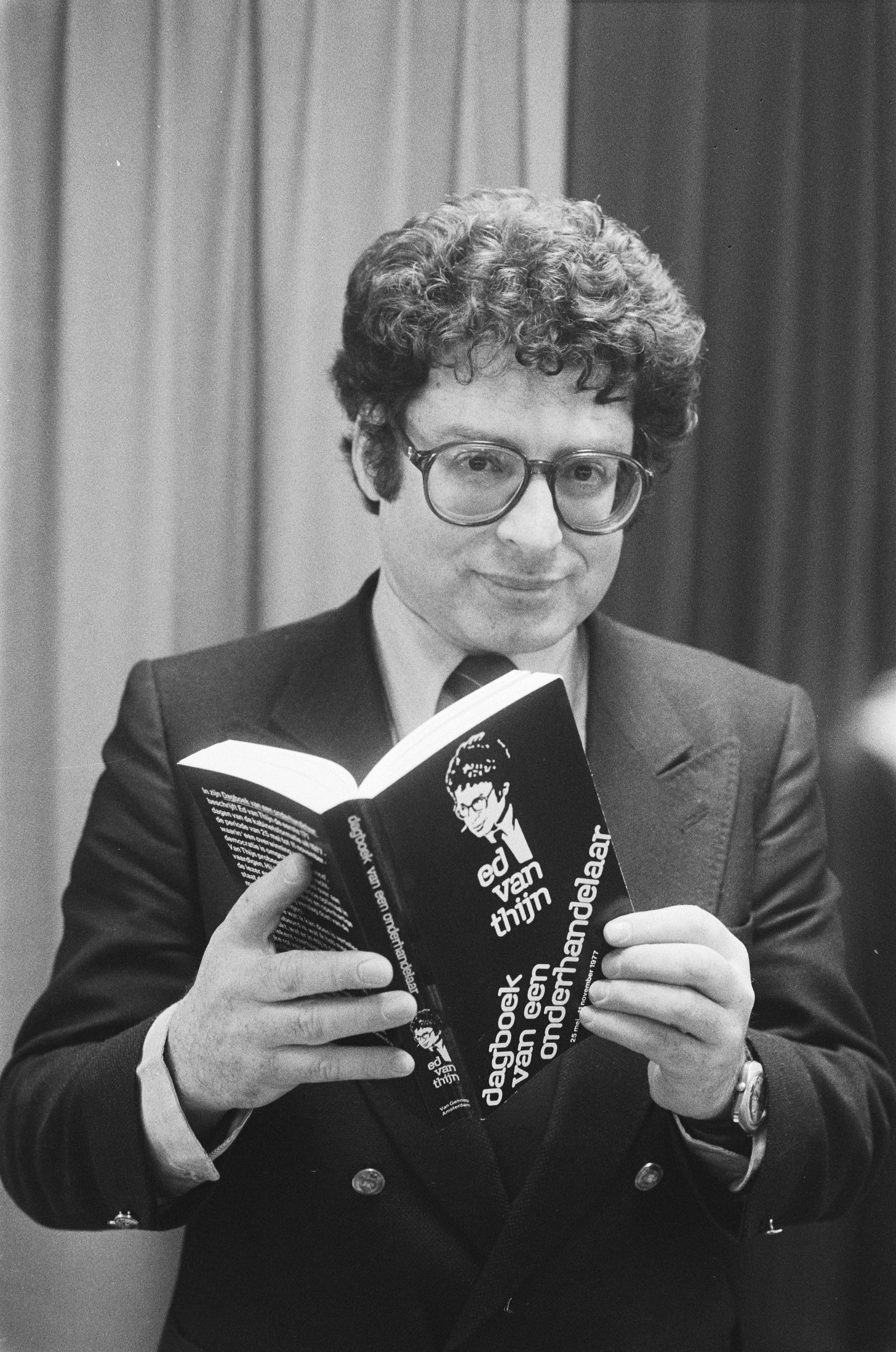
Ed van Thijn

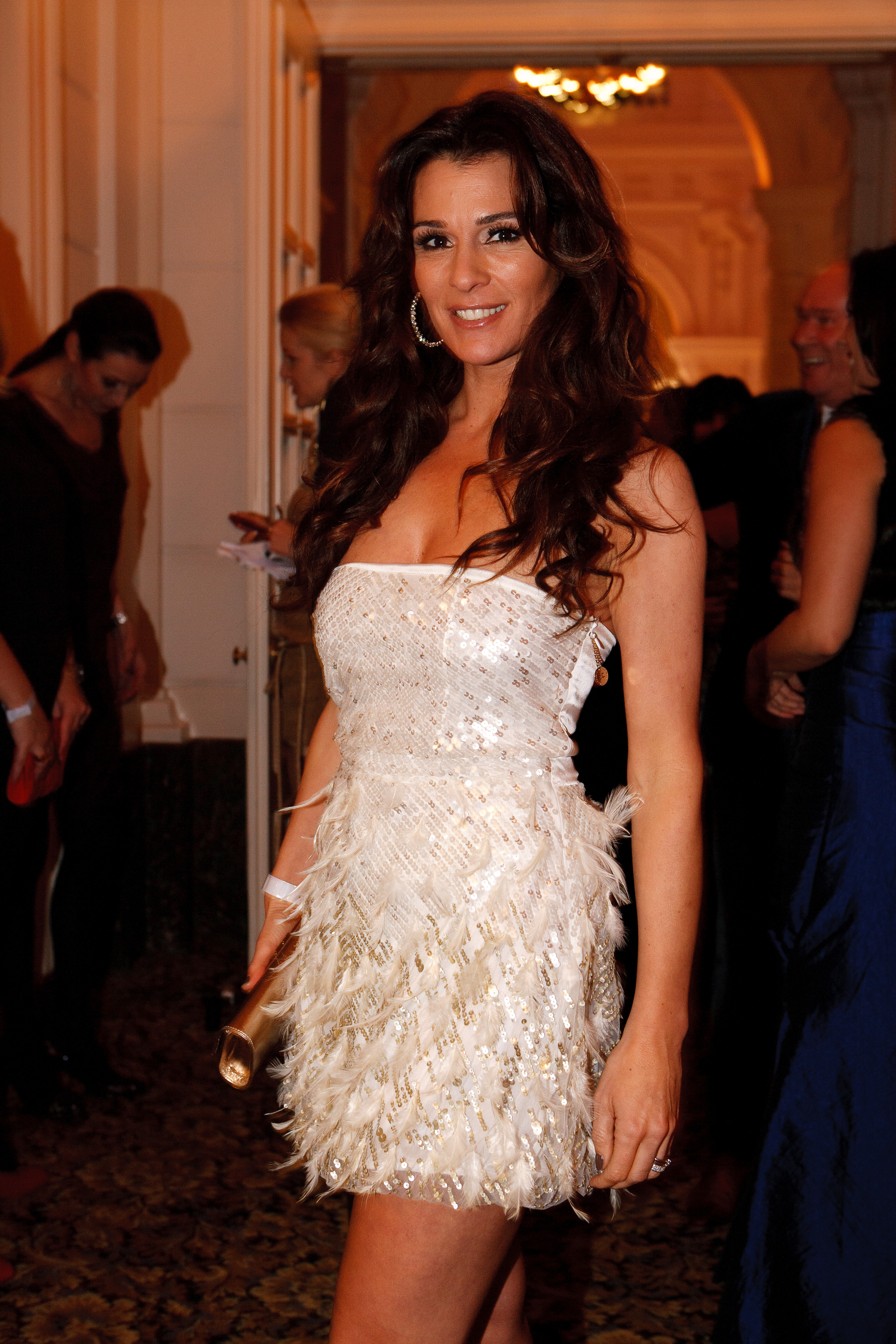
Quinty Trustfull

- Wally Tax (1948–2004), singer-songwriter
- Joseph Teixeira de Mattos (1892–1971), watercolor painter and pastellist
- Henk Terlingen (1941–1994), presenter
- Brian Tevreden (1981), football player
- Ed van Thijn (1934–2021), politician
- Theo Thijssen (1879–1943), writer, teacher and politician
- Raymond Thiry (born 1959), actor
- Frits Thors (1909–2014), journalist and news anchor
- Eric van Tijn (born 1956), music producer
- Jan Timman (born 1951), chess player
- Herman Tjeenk Willink (born 1942), politician
- Waldemar Torenstra (born 1974), actor
- Anton Toscani (1901–1984), Olympic 50 km race walker
- Karim Touzani (born 1980), football player
- Orlando Trustfull (born 1970), football player
- Quinty Trustfull (born 1971), actress, TV presenter and former model
- Frits van Turenhout (1913–2004), radio and TV sports journalist

=== V ===
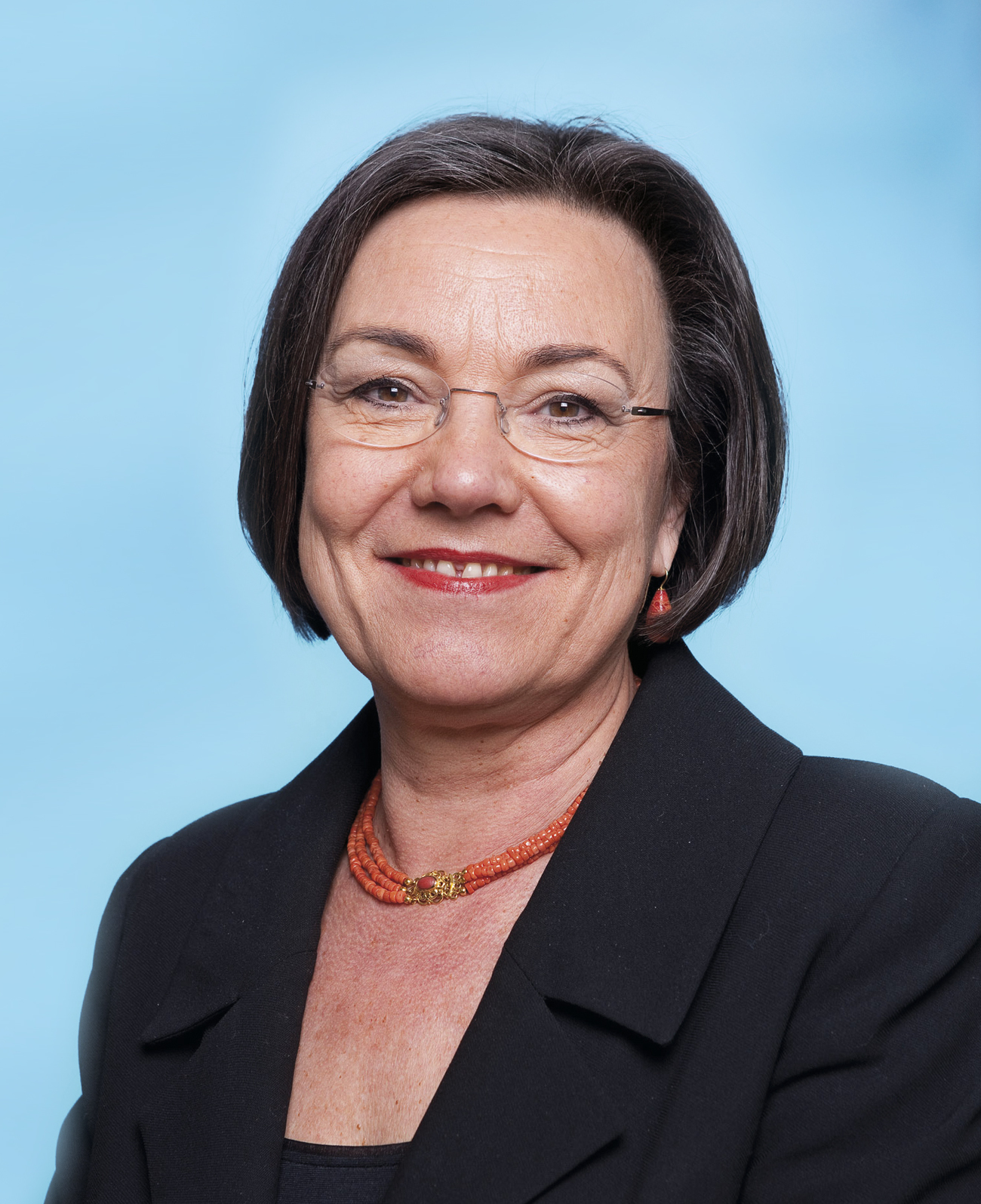
Gerdi Verbeet

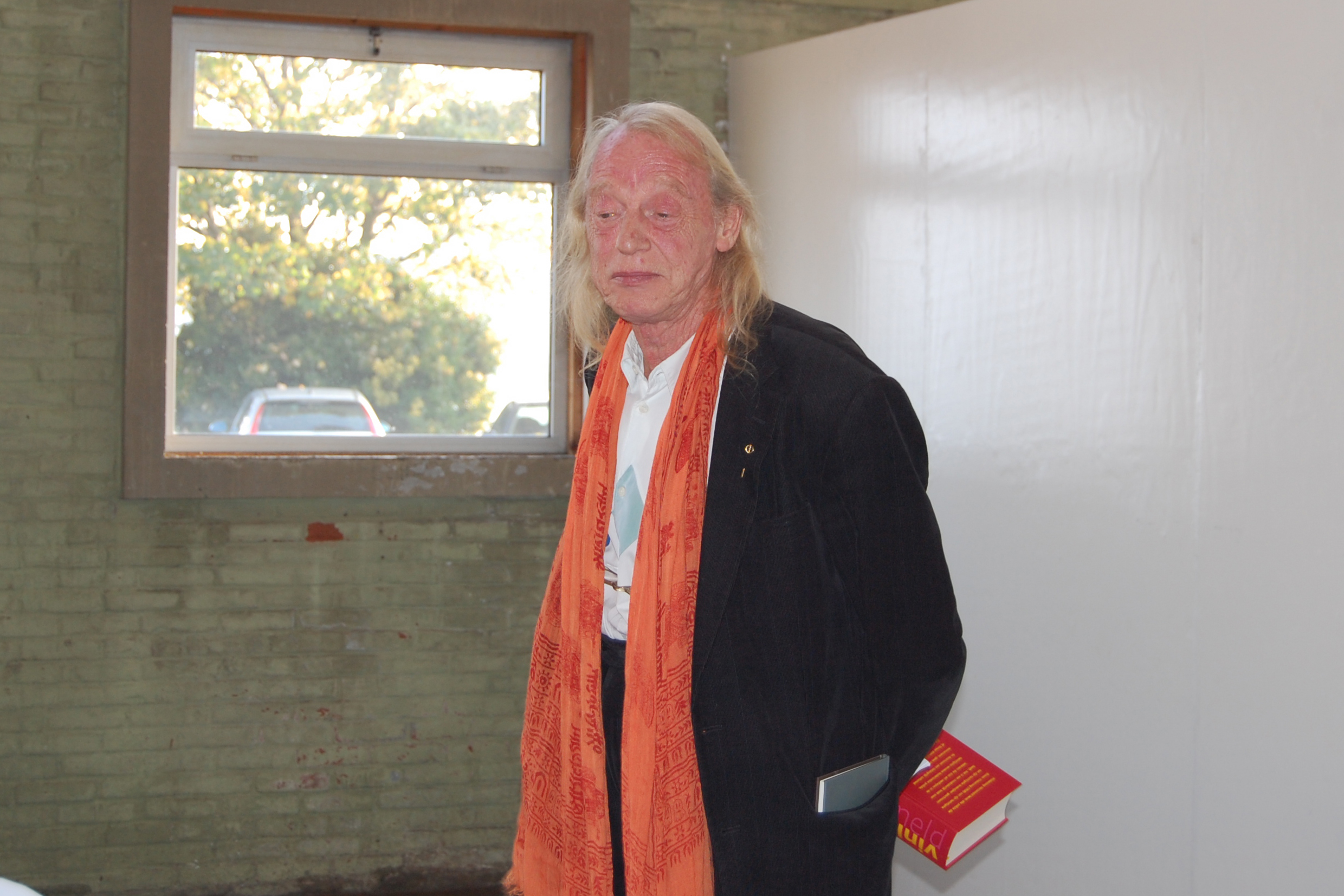
Simon Vinkenoog

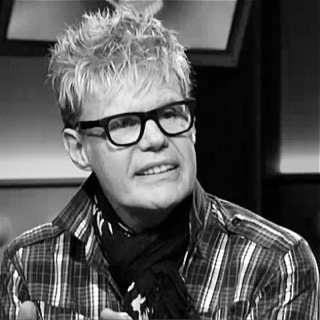
Ad Visser

- Arsenio Valpoort (born 1992), football player
- Gerrit van der Veen (1902–1944), sculptor
- Alex van Halen (born 1953), musician, drummer
- Edward van Halen (1955–2020), musician, guitarist
- Ed Vijent (1963–2001), football player
- Marko Vejinović (born 1990), football player
- Adriaen van de Velde (1636–1672), painter, draughtsman and print artist
- Willem van de Velde the Younger (1633–1707), marine painter
- Nick van der Velden (born 1981), football player
- Lau Veldt (born 1953), Olympic cyclist
- Gerdi Verbeet (born 1951), politician
- Emmy Verhey (born 1949), classical violinist
- Paul Verhoeven (born 1938), film director
- Nico Verlaan (born 1932), entrepreneur and politician
- Kenneth Vermeer (born 1986), football player (goalkeeper)
- Hendrik Verwoerd (1901–1966), former prime minister of South Africa
- Jo Vincent (1898–1989), concert soprano in oratorios
- Simon Vinkenoog (1928–2009), writer
- Ad Visser (born 1947), presenter
- Stefanie van Vliet (born 1967), politician
- Wim Volkers (1899–1990), football player
- Henk Vonhoff (1931–2010), politician
- Corry Vonk (1901–1988), revue and cabaret performer
- Michiel Vos (born 1970), Dutch-American journalist and US-based correspondent
- Elles Voskes (born 1964), swimmer
- Jonathan Vosselman (born 1984), football player
- Frans de Vreng (1898–1974), Olympic track cyclist
- James Vrij (born 1951), retired welterweight boxer
- Coen van Vrijberghe de Coningh (1950–1997), actor

=== W ===
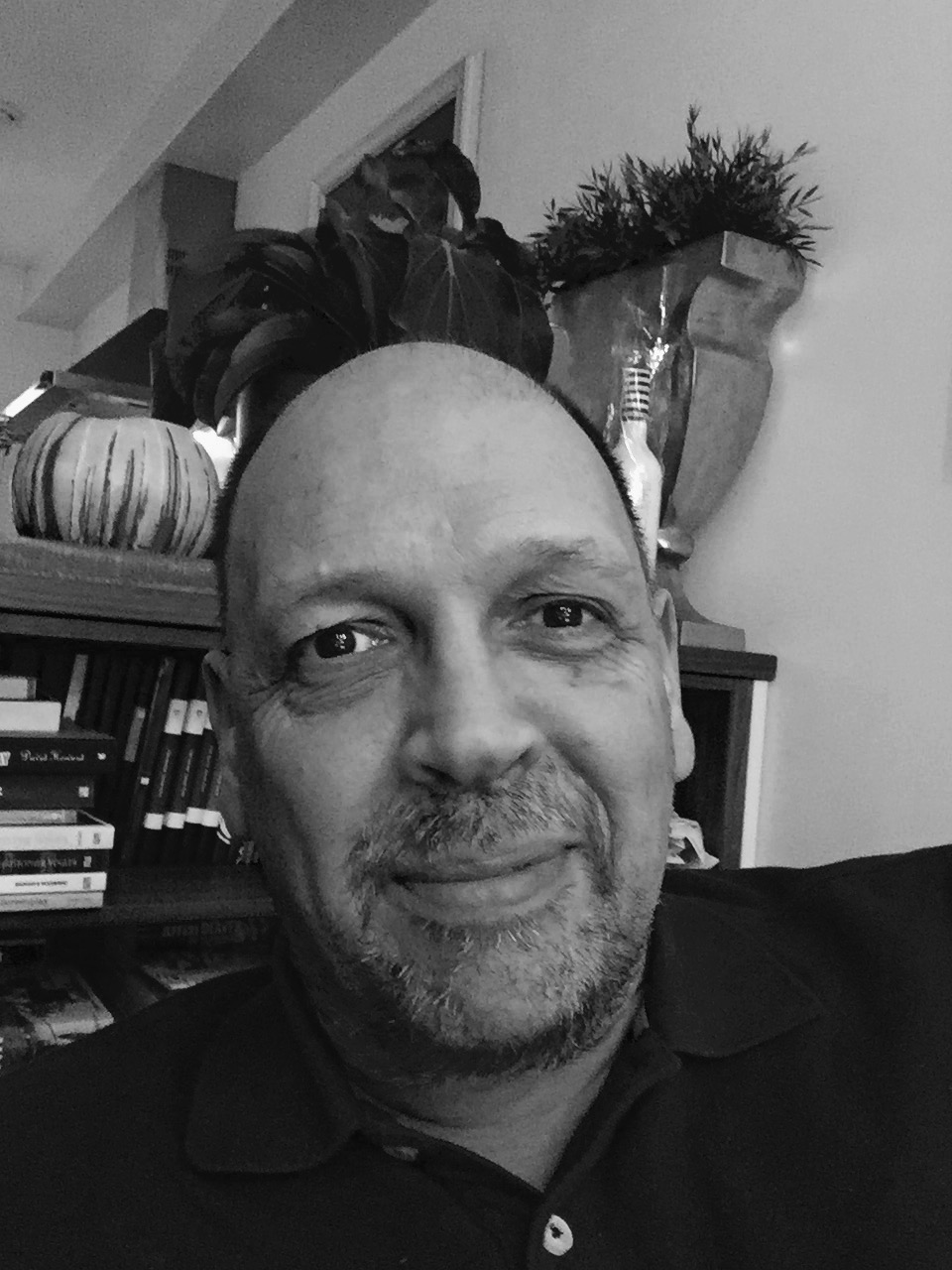
Simon de Waal

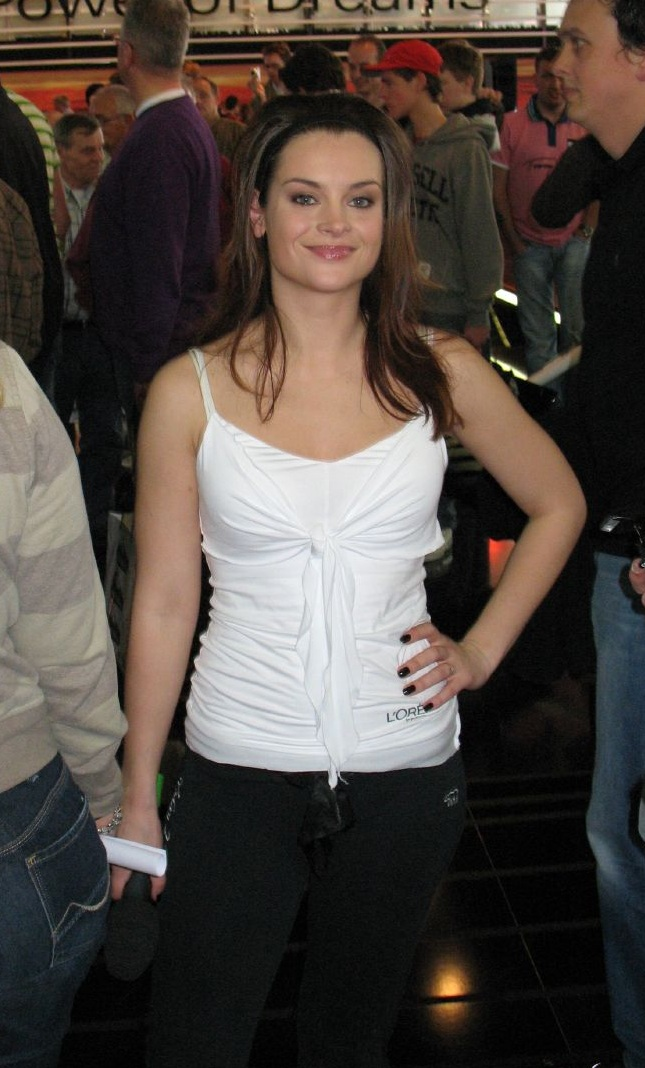
Miljuschka Witzenhausen, 2010

- Simon de Waal (born 1961), writer of TV and film scripts
- Willie Wartaal (born 1982)
- Jan Baptist Weenix (1621–ca.1659), painter
- Frans Weisz (born 1938), film director
- Hans Wiegel (born 1941), politician
- Gregory van der Wiel (born 1988), football player
- Elsje de Wijn (born 1944), actor
- David Wijnkoop (1876–1941), politicus
- Joseph Wijnkoop (1842–1910), rabbi and scholar in Jewish studies
- Harry Wijnschenk (born 1964), politician
- Wimie Wilhelm (born 1961), actor
- Ernst Witkamp (1854–1987), painter
- Rob Witschge (born 1966), football player
- Richard Witschge (born 1969), football player
- Miljuschka Witzenhausen (born 1985), model and actress
- Freule Wttewaall van Stoetwegen (1901–1986), politician

=== Y ===
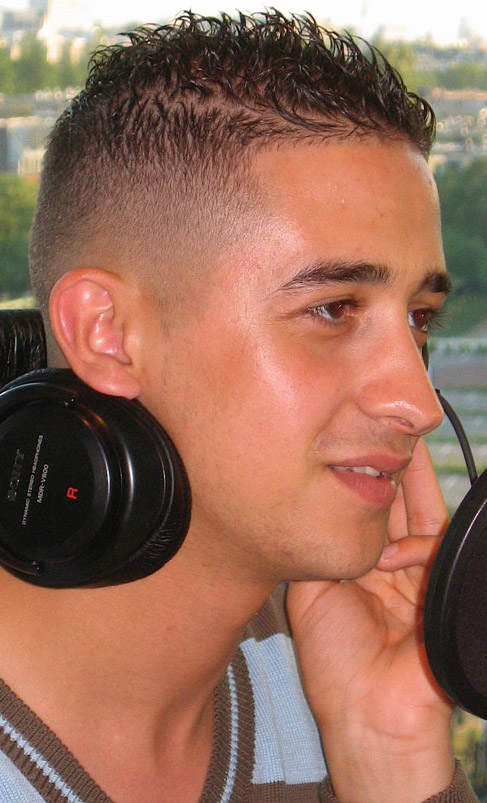
Yes-R

- Yes-R (born 1986), stage name of Yesser Roshdy, rapper and TV presenter

=== Z ===
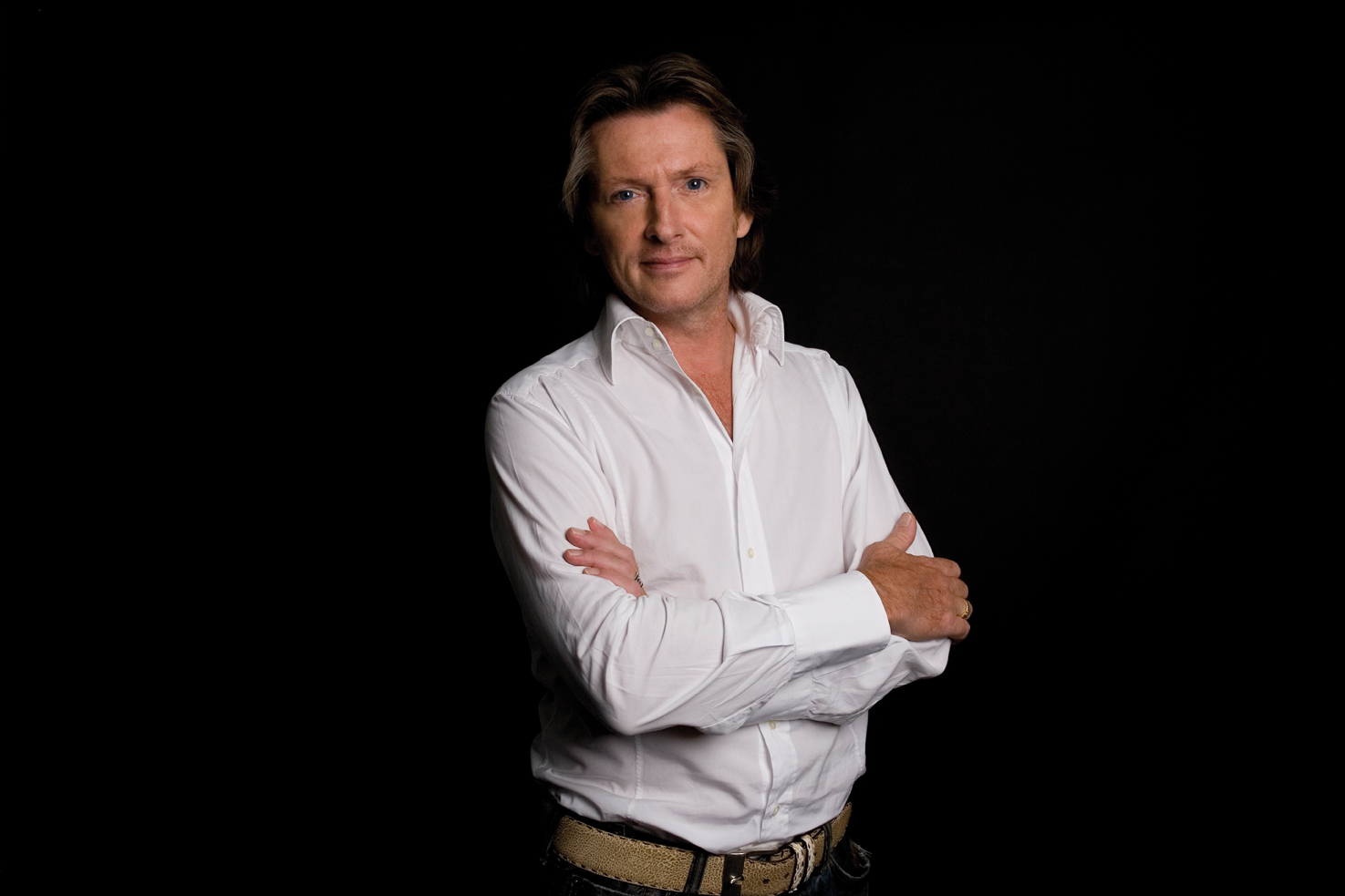
Erik de Zwart

- Rowin van Zaanen (born 1984), football player
- Philip Van Zandt (1904–1958), actor
- Michel Zanoli (born 1968), Olympic cyclist
- Género Zeefuik (born 1990), football player
- Marvin Zeegelaar (born 1990), football player
- Bart Zeilstra (born 1982), singer
- Anne Zernike (1887–1972), liberal theologian
- Frits Zernike (1888–1966), physicist and winner of the Nobel Prize in Physics in 1953
- Jo Zwaan (1922–2012), sprinter
- Erik de Zwart (born 1957), radio and TV maker and former DJ
- Jaap van Zweden (born 1960), classical conductor and violinist
- Ron Zwerver (born 1967), retired volleyball player

== Born somewhere else ==
These people were not born or adopted in Amsterdam but are or were well known for living there.

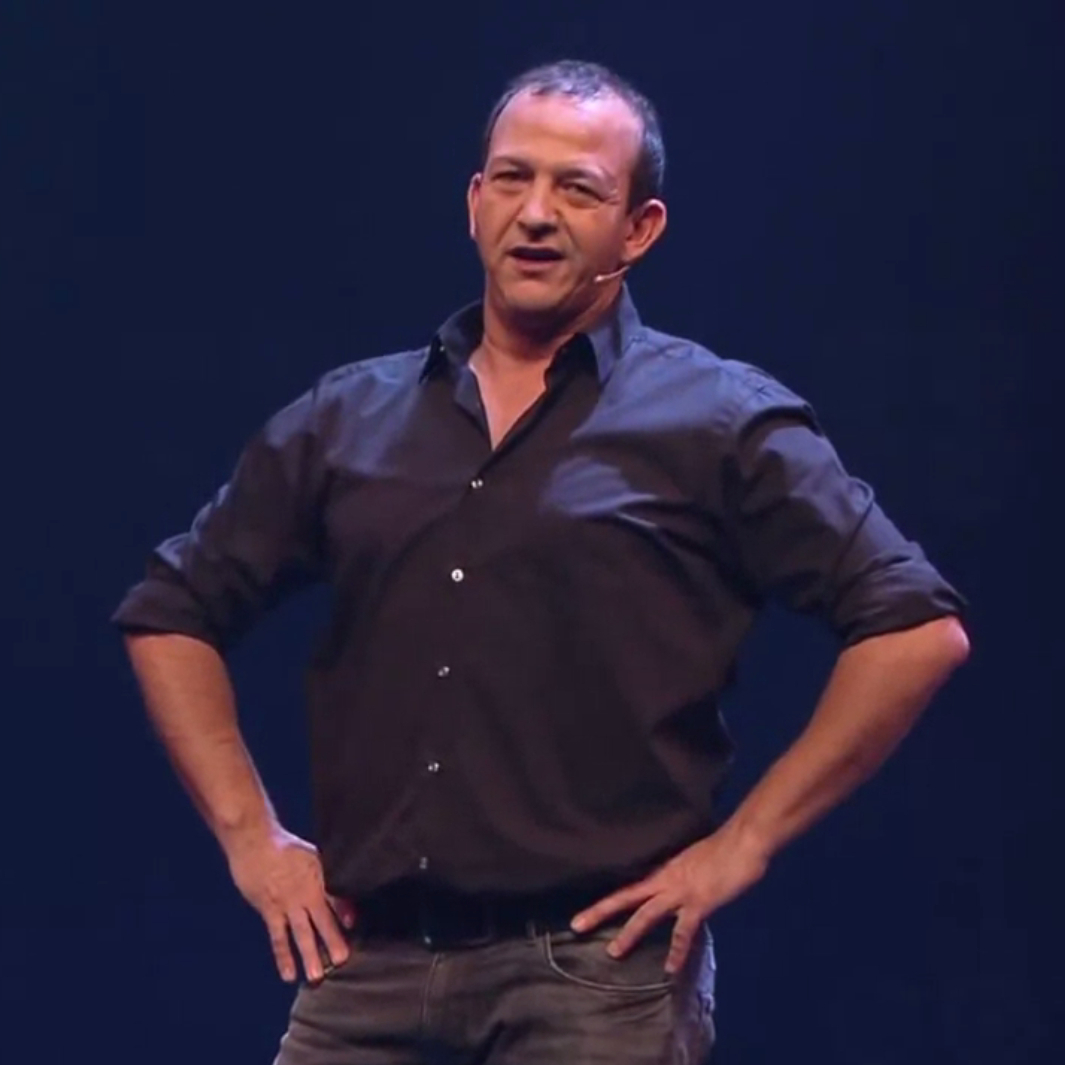
Najib Amhali, 2013

=== A ===
- Thomas Acda (born 1967), singer, actor and comedian
- Karin Adelmund (1949–2005), politician
- Najib Amhali (born 1971), stand-up comedian and actor
- Hedy d'Ancona (born 1937), politician
- Khadija Arib (born 1960), politician

=== B ===
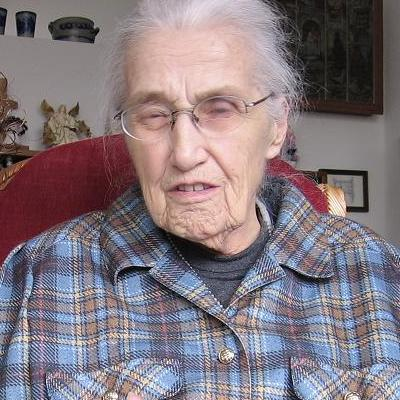
Majoor Bosshardt

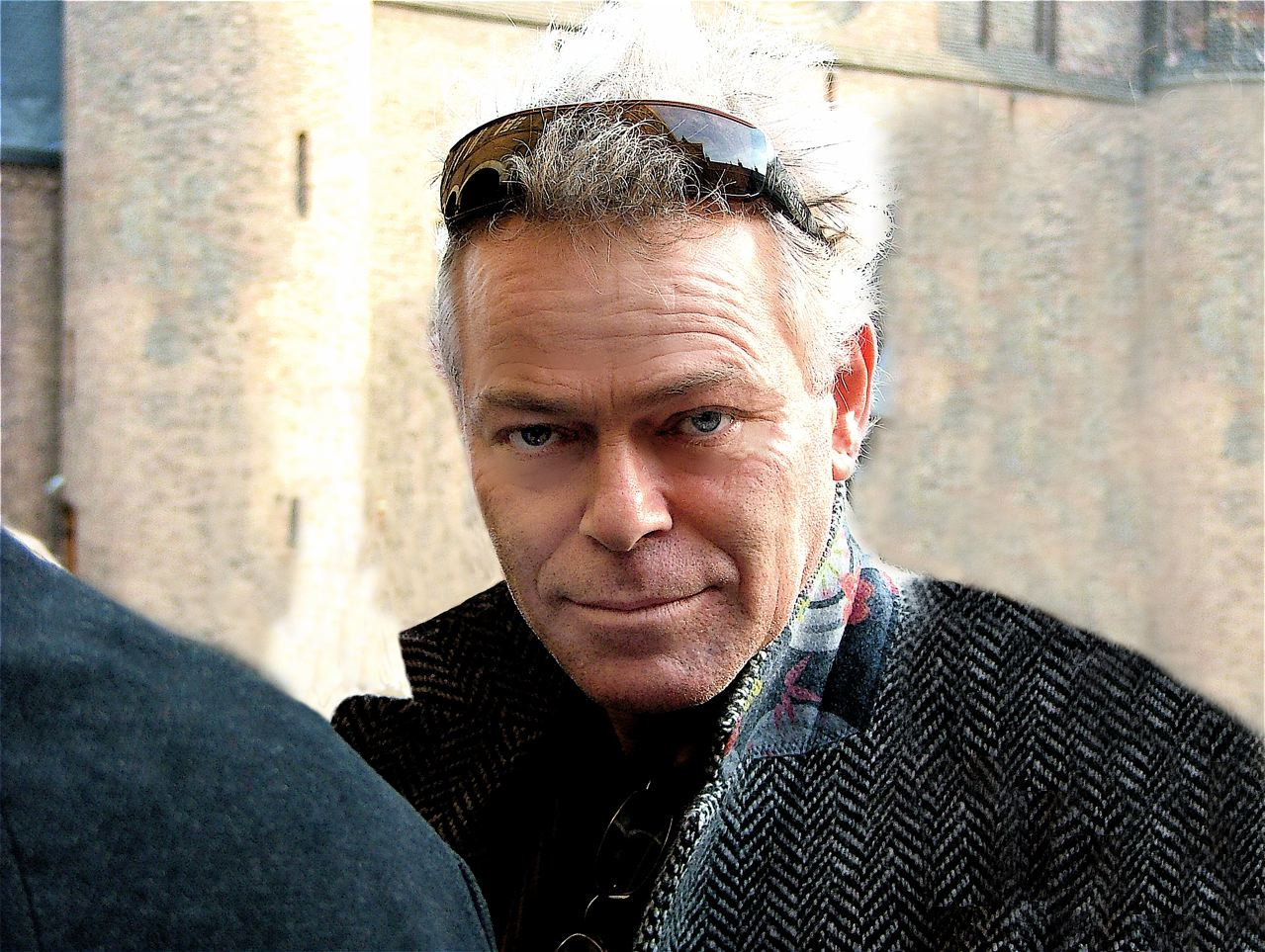
Martin Bril

- Hassan Bahara (born 1978), Moroccan-Dutch writer
- Mike Barson (born 1958), British musician, composer, and songwriter, member of Madness
- Abdelkader Benali (born 1975), writer
- Guy Berryman (born 1978), Scottish bassist, songwriter and designer, member of Coldplay
- Fanny Blankers-Koen (1918–2004), athlete
- Ferdinand Bol (1616–1680), painter, etcher and draftsman
- Wouter Bos (born 1963), politician
- Martin Bosma (born 1964), politicus
- Majoor Bosshardt (1913–2007), officer in The Salvation Army
- Aaf Bouber (1885–1974), actor
- Brace (born 1986), singer
- Patty Brard (born 1955), TV personality and singer
- George Hendrik Breitner (1857–1923), painter and photographer
- Herman Brood (1946–2001), musician, painter, actor and poet
- Martin Brozius (1941–2009), actor, presenter and comedian
- Inge de Bruijn (born 1973), swimmer
- Boudewijn Büch (1948–2002), writer, poet and television presenter

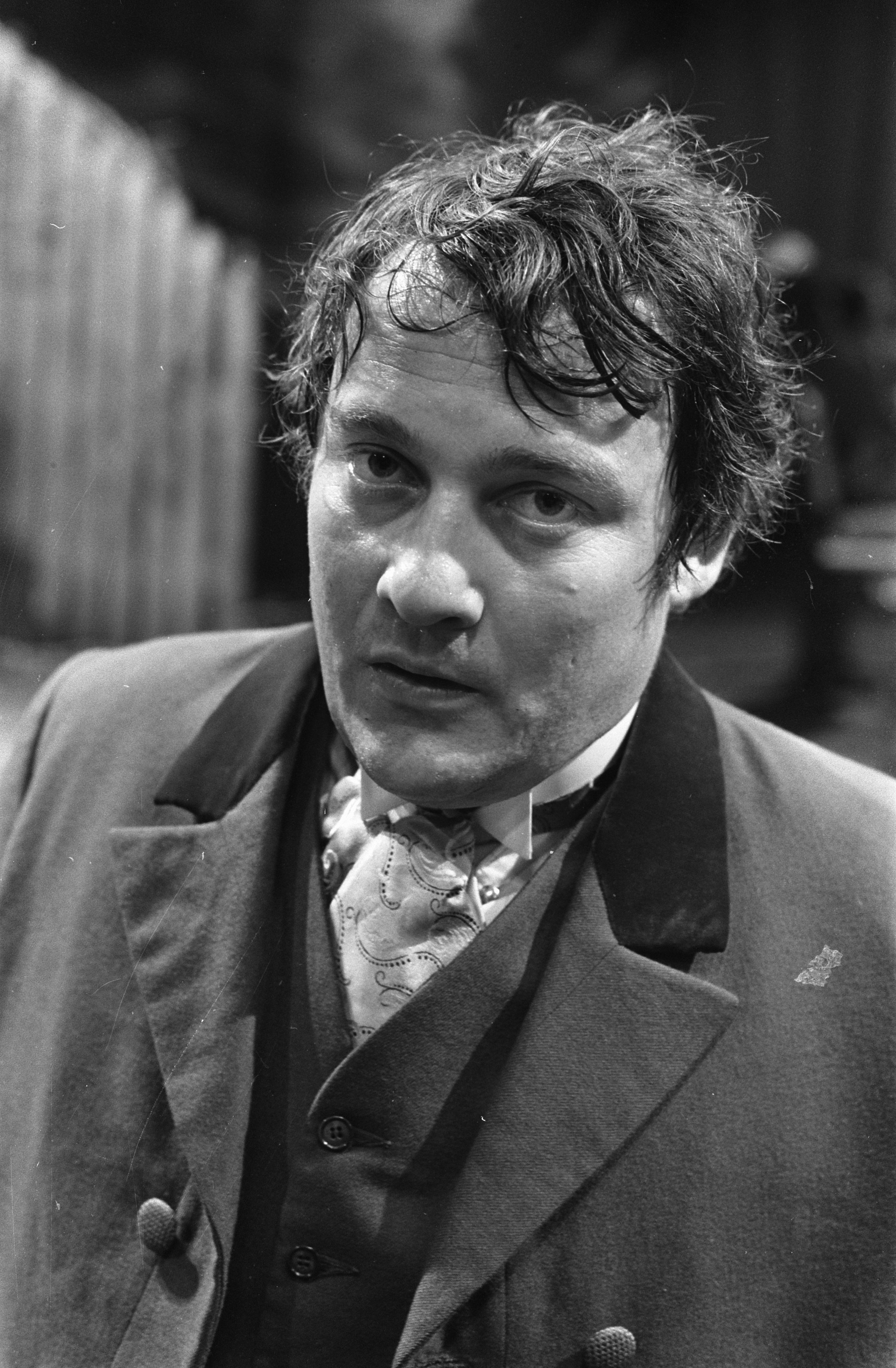
Jules Croiset, 1970

=== C ===
- Remco Campert (born 1929), author, poet and columnist
- Simon Carmiggelt (1913–1987), writer, journalist, and poet
- Job Cohen (born 1947), retired Dutch politician, mayor of Amsterdam, 2001–2010
- Arthur Conley (1946–2003), American soul singer
- Jules Croiset (born 1937), actor

=== D ===
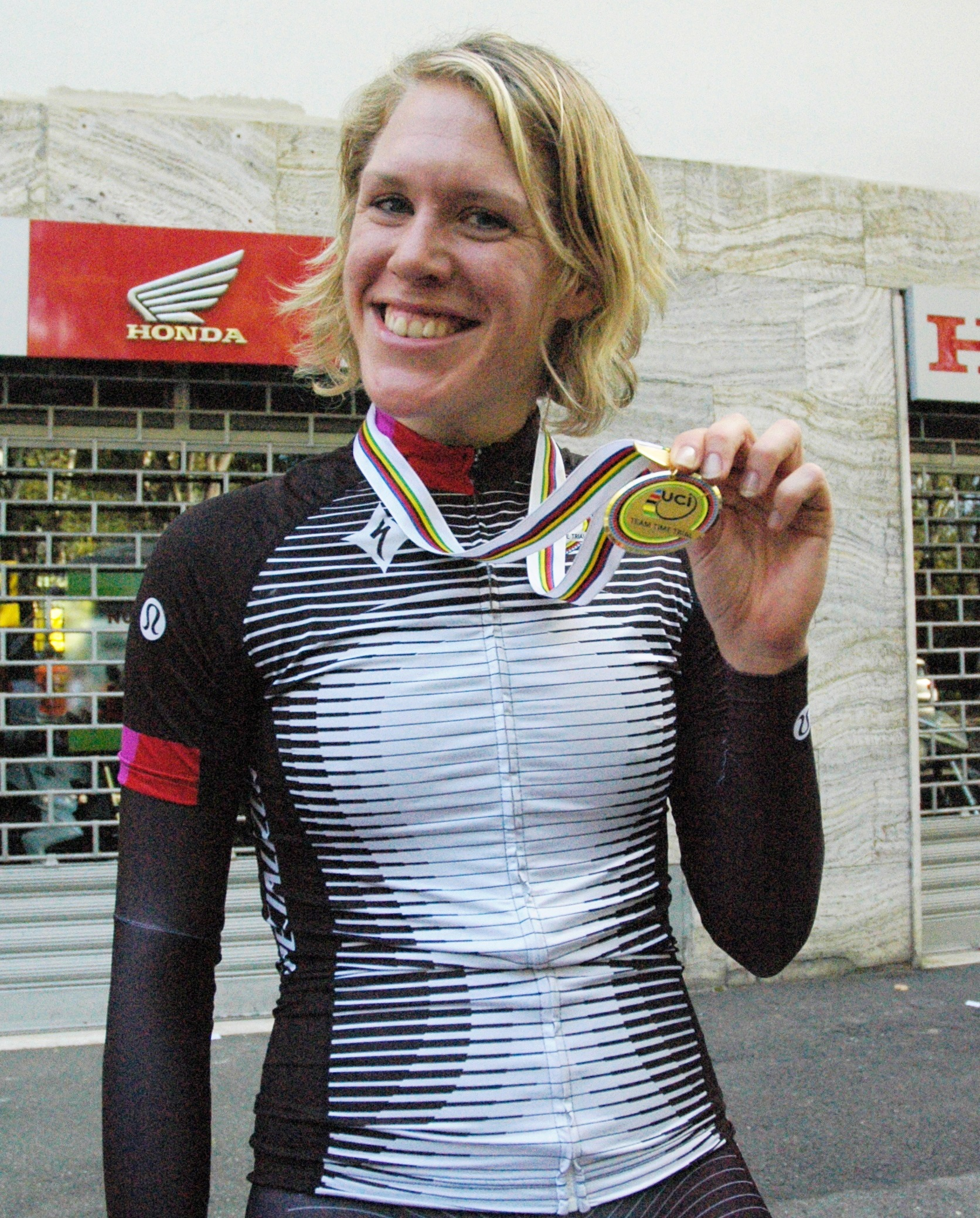
Ellen van Dijk

- Josine van Dalsum (1948–2009), actress
- Antoon Derkinderen (1859–1925), painter, glass artist and designer of book covers
- Tofik Dibi (born 1980), politicus
- Dominique van Dijk (born 1979), football player
- Ellen van Dijk (born 1987), Dutch cyclist, lived in Amsterdam from 2008 to 2014
- Jasper van Dijk (born 1971), politicus
- Boris Dittrich (born 1955), politician
- Jan Hein Donner (1927–1988), chess grandmaster
- Mary Dresselhuys (1907–2004), stage actress
- André van Duin (born 1947), comedian, actor, singer-songwriter and author
- Marlene Dumas (born 1953), South African artist

=== E ===
- Norbert Elias (1897–1990), German sociologist
- Beau van Erven Dorens (born 1970), TV presenter, actor and voice actor
- Andrée van Es (born 1953), politicus

=== F ===
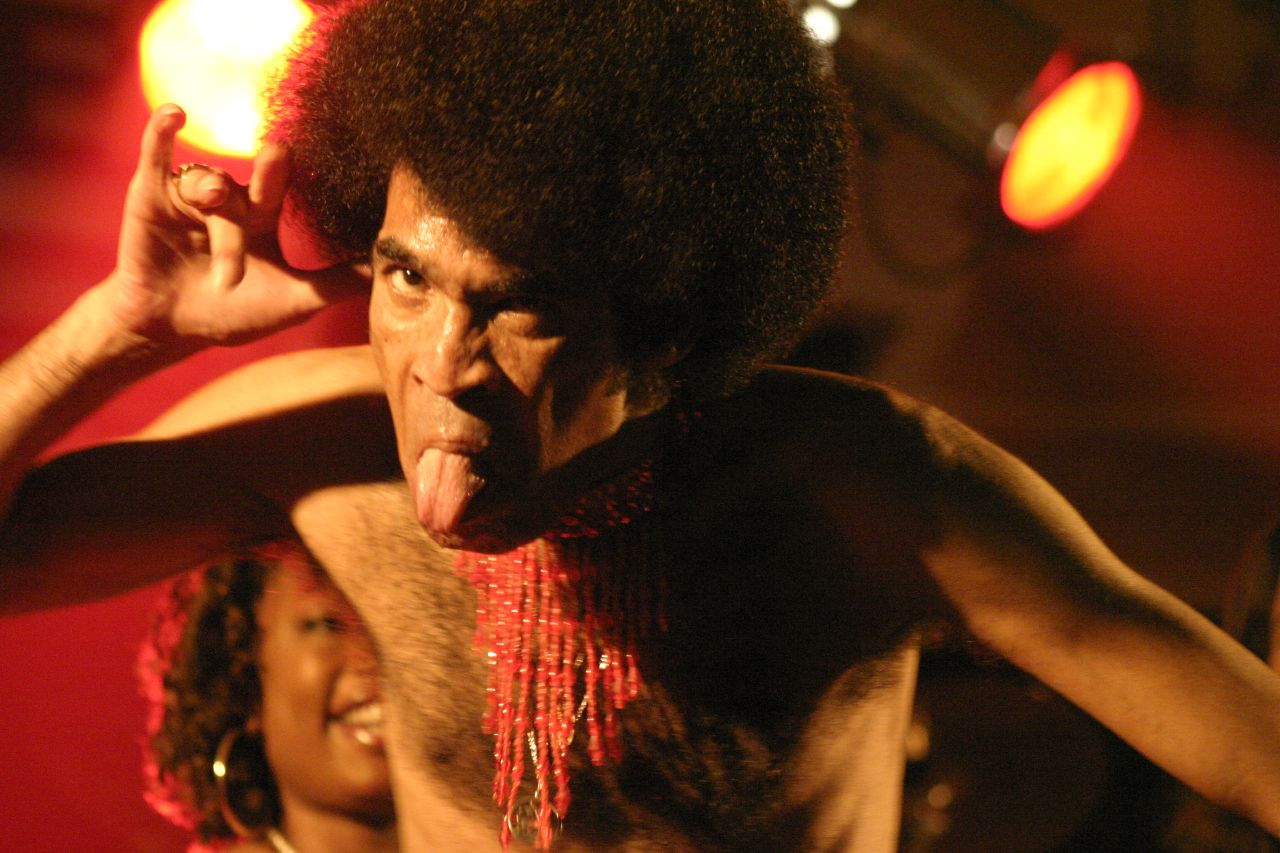
Bobby Farrell, Boney M. singer

- Bobby Farrell (1949–2010), dancer and singer with Boney M.
- Govert Flinck (1615–1660), painter
- Anne Frank (1929–1945), diarist and victim of the Holocaust

=== G ===
- Artus Gheerdinck (1564–1624), harpsichord maker
- Miep Gies (1909–2010), hid Dutch Jews, including Anne Frank, from the Nazis
- Angela Groothuizen (born 1959), singer with Dolly Dots, artist and TV personality
- Tony Geary (1947–2025) American actor. (Luke Spencer) General Hospital.

=== H ===
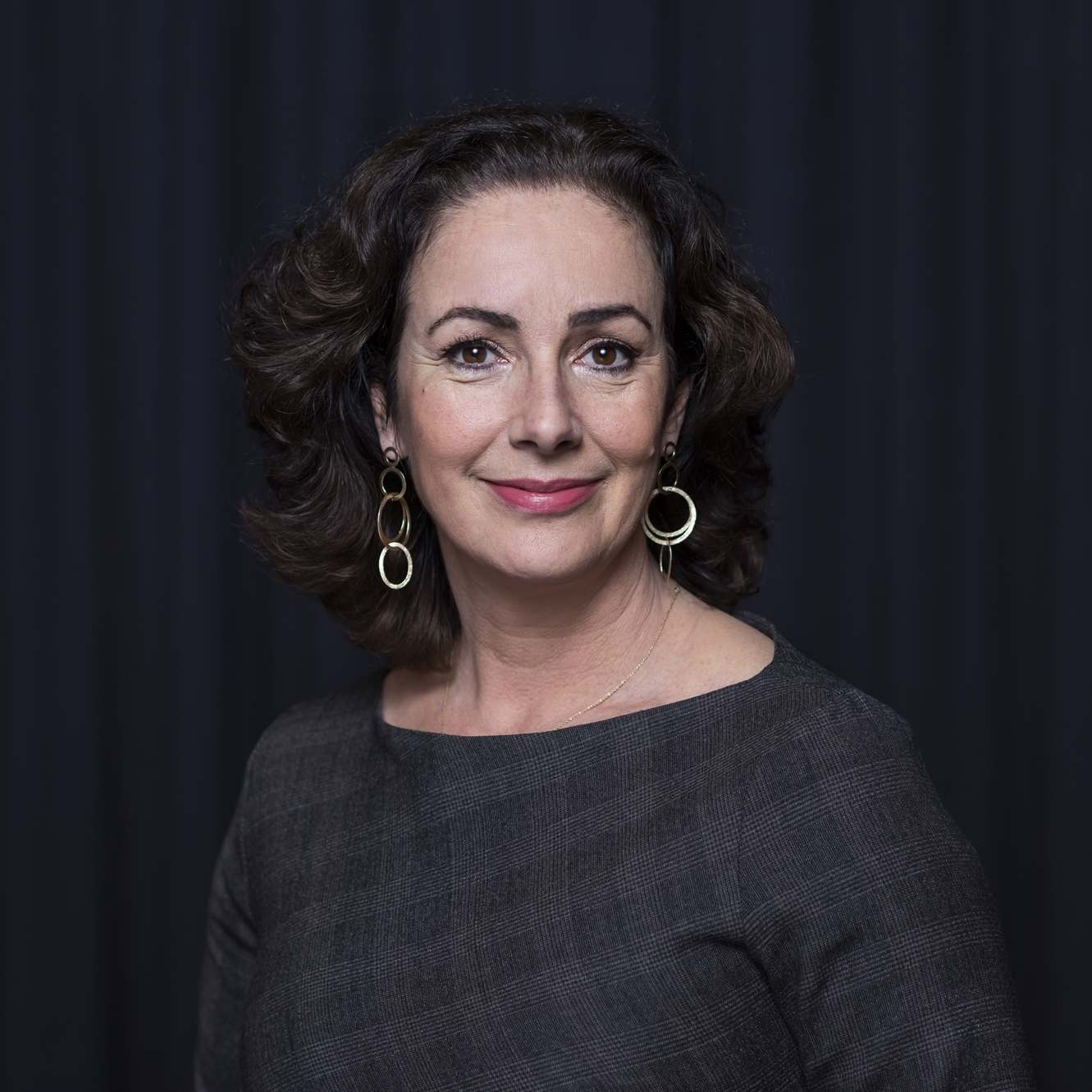
Femke Halsema, Amsterdam mayor

- Hella Haasse (1918–2011), writer, the "Grande Dame" of Dutch literature
- Femke Halsema (born 1966), politician, mayor of Amsterdam since 2018
- Eddy Hamel (1902–1943), Jewish-American soccer player for Dutch club AFC Ajax who was killed by the Nazis in Auschwitz concentration camp
- Johannes Heesters (1903–2011), actor of stage, TV and film and vocalist
- A.F.Th. van der Heijden (born 1951), writer
- Youp van 't Hek (born 1954), comedian, author, columnist and singer-songwriter
- Meindert Hobbema (1638–1709), landscape painter
- Wim Hogenkamp (1947–1989), actor, lyricist and singer
- Jodocus Hondius (1563–1612), engraver and cartographer
- Ellen Hoog (born 1986), hockey player
- Nan Hoover (1931–2008), video art, installation art, photography and drawing
- Carice van Houten (born 1976), actor

=== I ===
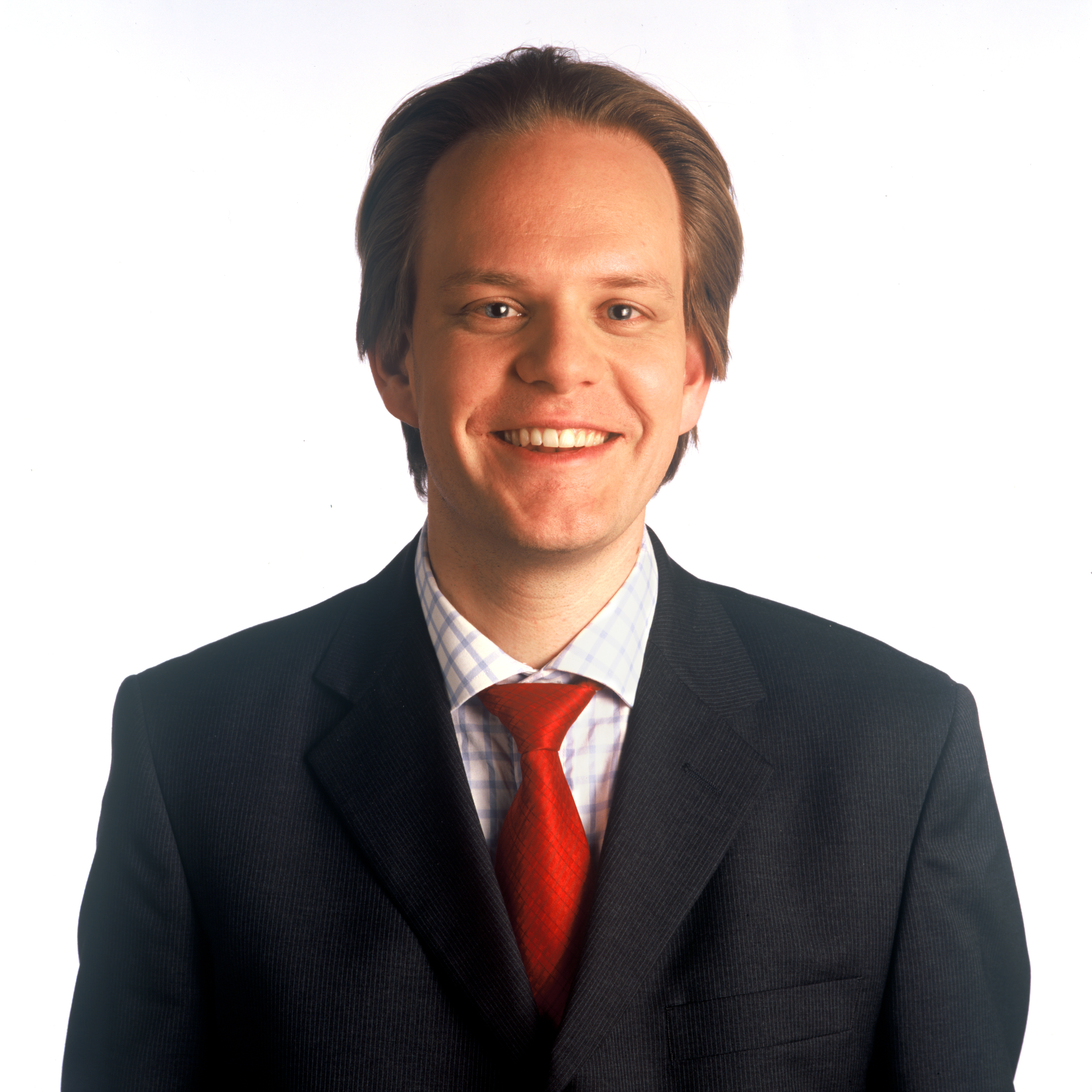
Ewout Irrgang, 2008

- Ewout Irrgang (born 1976), politicus

=== J ===
- Tanja Jadnanansing (born 1967), politicus
- Cas Jansen (born 1977), actor
- Johannes Hendricus Jurres (1875–1946), painter

=== K ===
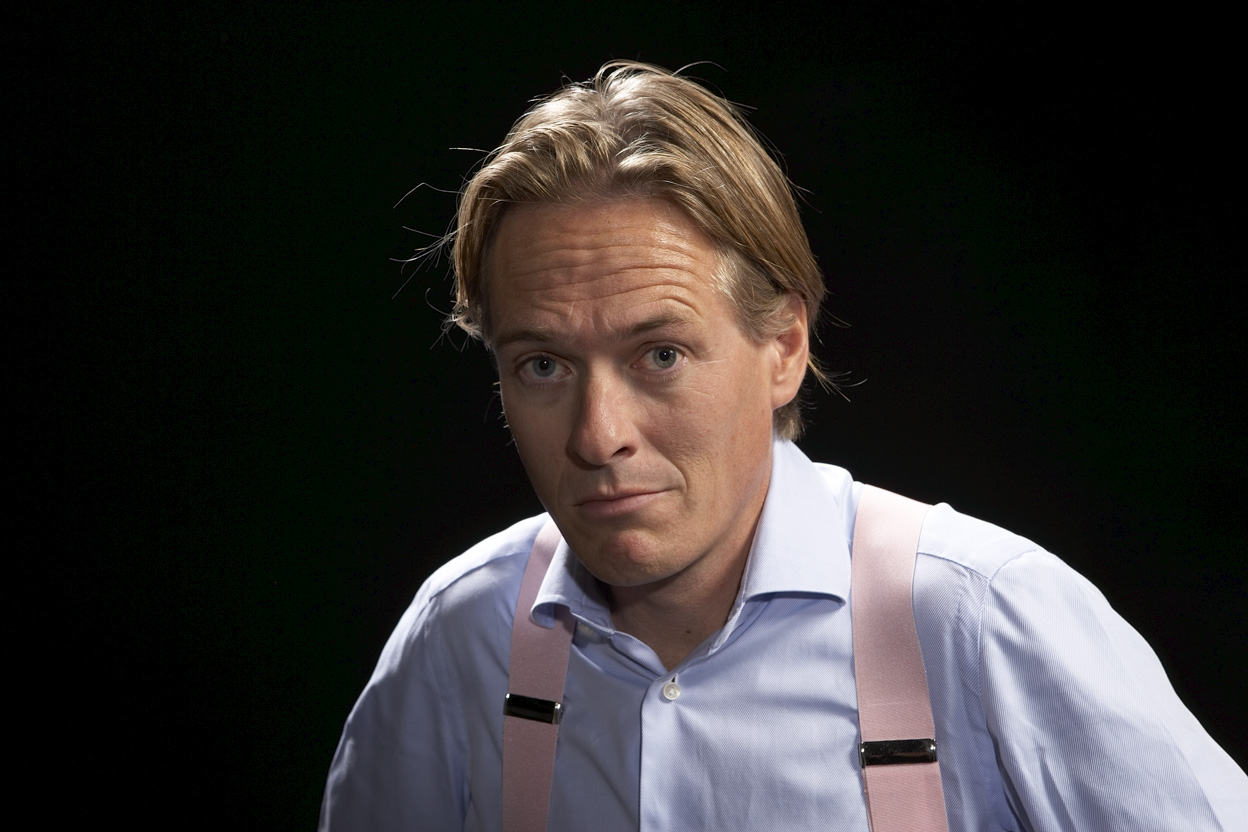
Jort Kelder

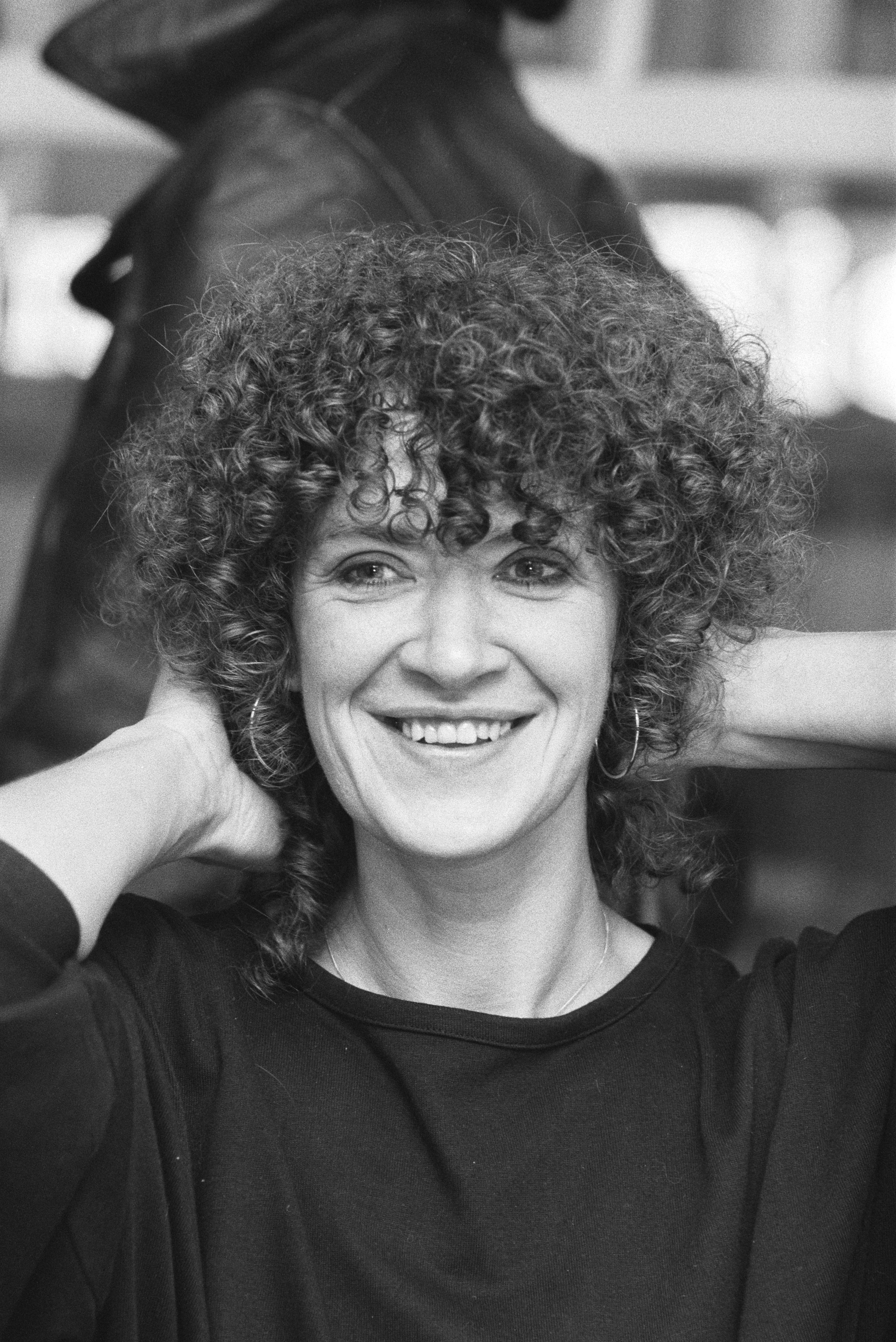
Mensje van Keulen

- Jort Kelder (born 1964), journalist, TV presenter and former magazine editor
- Mensje van Keulen (born 1946), writer
- Raymond van de Klundert (born 1964; also known as Kluun), writer
- Jeroen van Koningsbrugge (born 1973), actor, comedian, singer, director and presenter
- Adriaan Kortlandt (1918–2009), ethologist (the scientific study of animal behaviour)
- Hildo Krop (1884–1970), sculptor and furniture designer

=== L ===
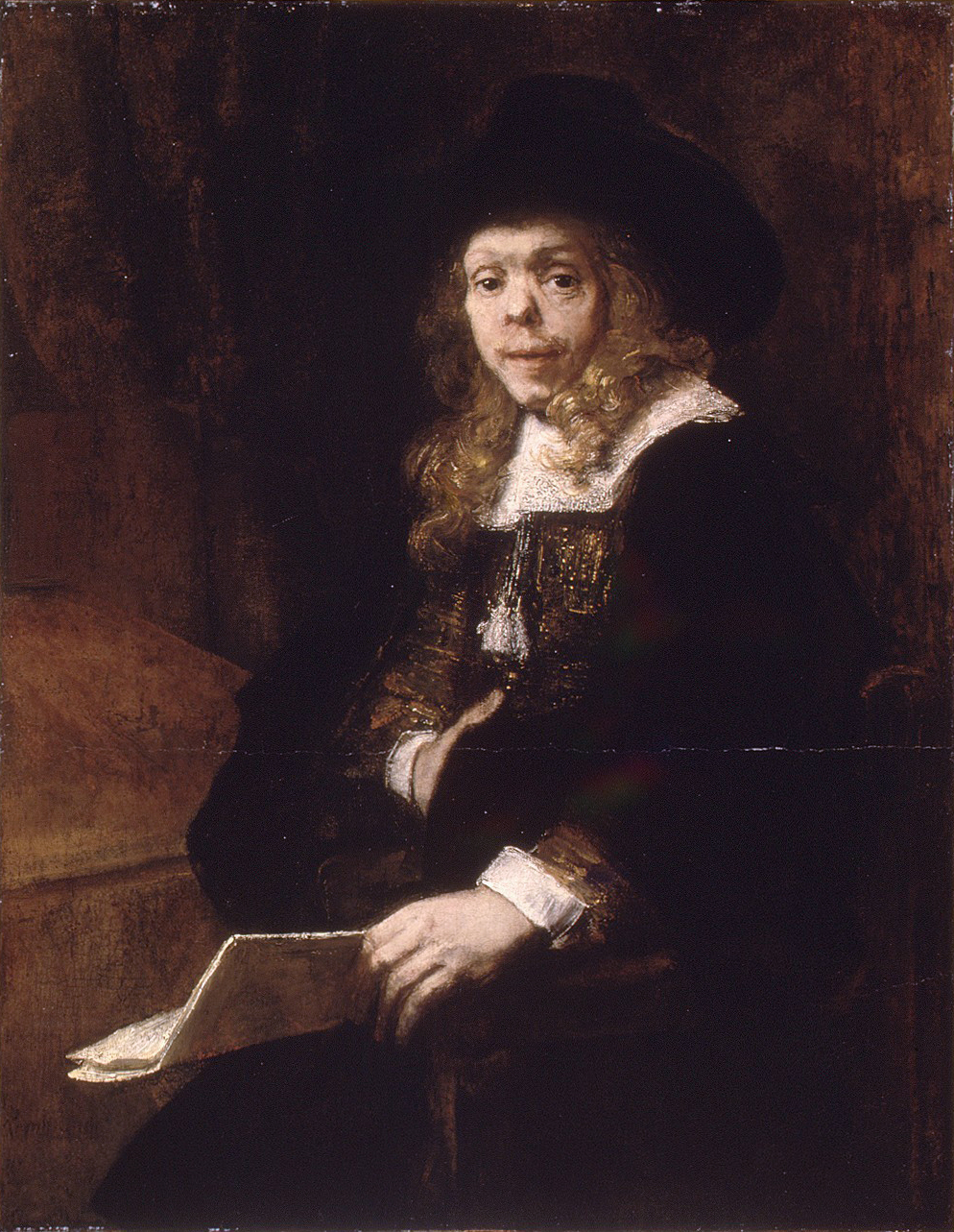
Gerard de Lairesse by Rembrandt, 1665

- Gerard de Lairesse (1640–1711), painter and art theorist
- John Leerdam (born 1961), politicus
- Paul de Leeuw (born 1962), TV comedian, singer and actor
- Søren Lerby (born 1958), football player and sport manager
- Patrick Lodiers (born 1971), TV presenter
- Jamai Loman (born 1986), singer

=== M ===
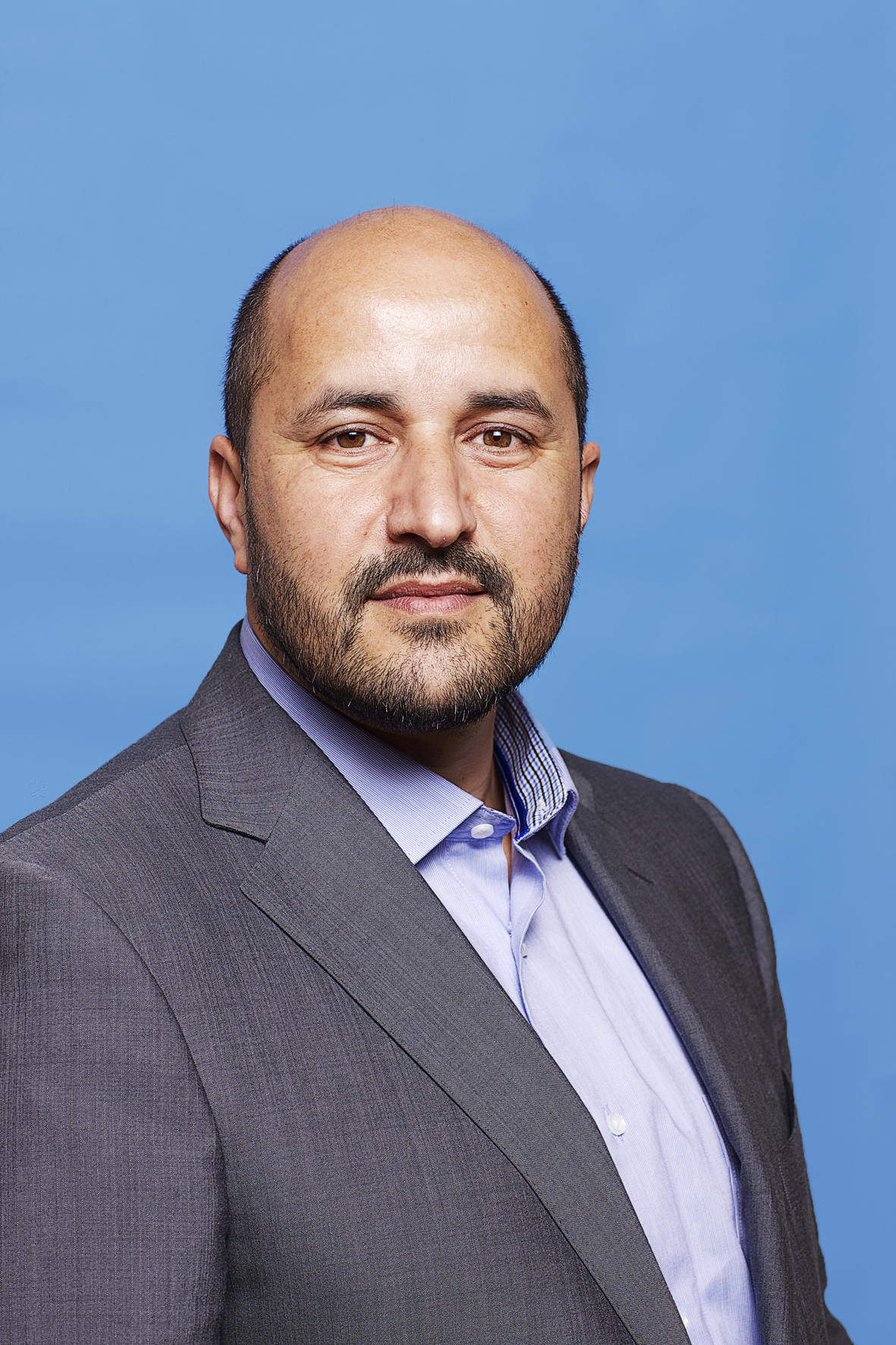
Ahmed Marcouch

- Bridget Maasland (born 1974), TV presenter and producer
- Geert Mak (born 1946), journalist and non-fiction writer
- Ahmed Marcouch (born 1969), politician, mayor of Arnhem since 2017
- Peer Mascini (1941–2019), actor
- Johnny de Mol (born 1979), actor and presenter
- Harry Mulisch (1927–2010), writer

=== N ===
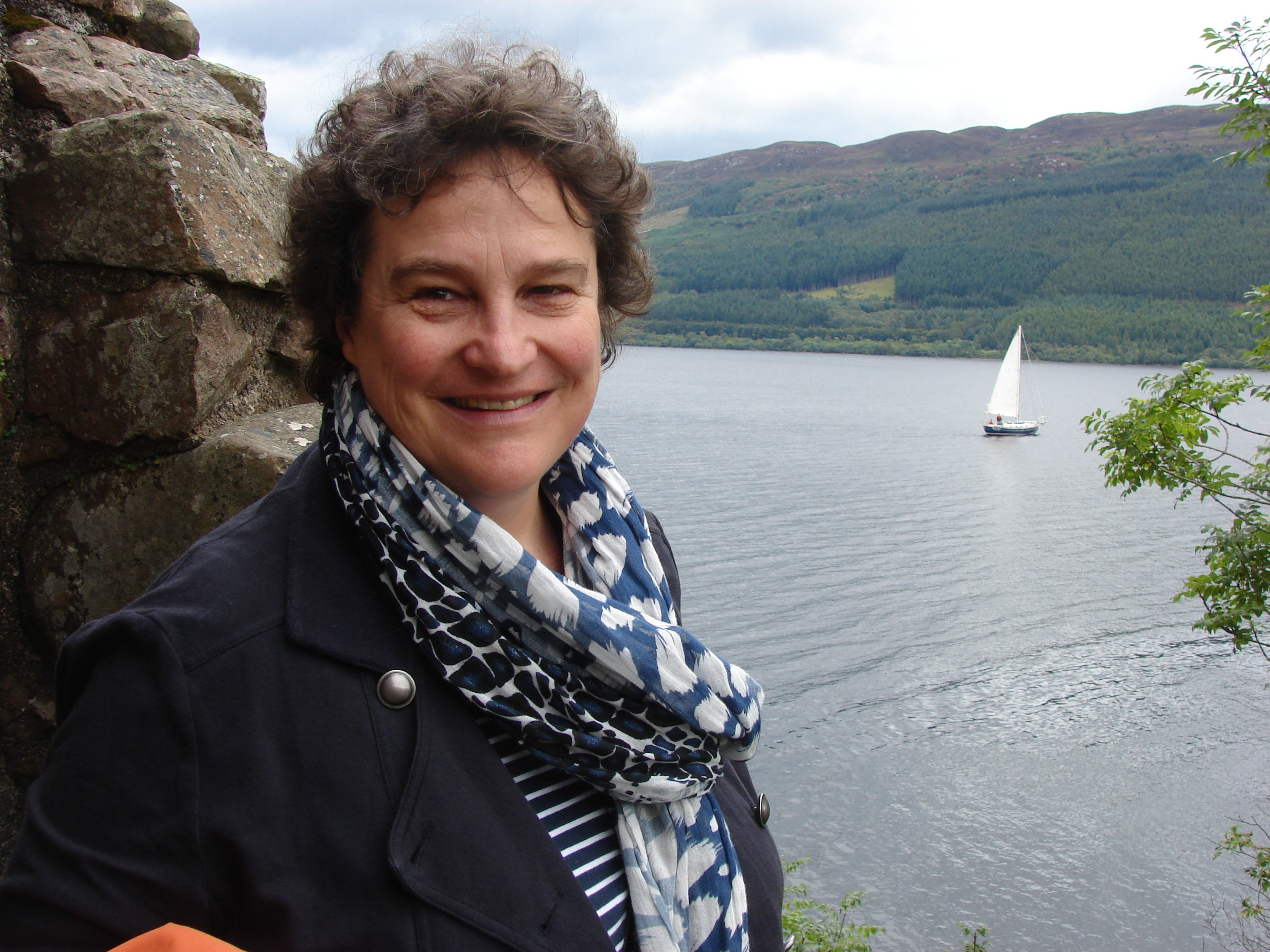
Marlene van Niekerk, 2018

- Marlene van Niekerk (born 1954), South African poet, writer, and academic

=== O ===
- Willem Oltmans (1925–2004), journalist

=== P ===
- Connie Palmen (born 1955), author
- Satyendra Pakhale (born India 1967), designer, industrial designer and architect
- David Pardo (ca.1591–1657), rabbi, born at Salonica
- Schelto Patijn (1936–2007), politician, mayor of Amsterdam, 1994–2001
- Benno Premsela (1920–1997), designer, visual artist and art collector

=== R ===
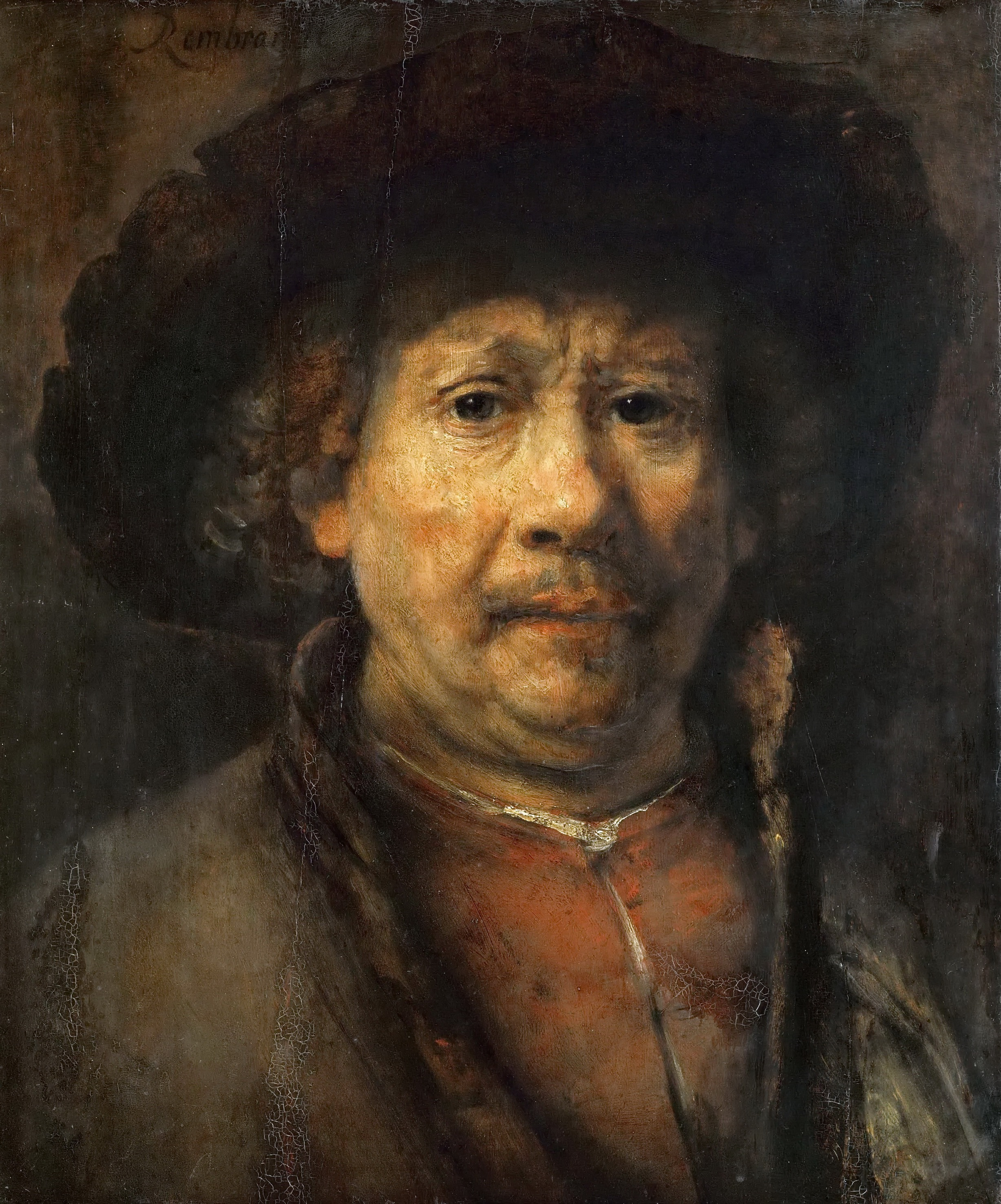
Rembrandt, 1655

- Ronald van Raak (born 1969), politicus
- Prem Radhakishun (born 1962), lawyer, columnist, actor and radio and TV producer
- Rembrandt van Rijn (1606/7–1669), painter, printmaker and draughtsman
- Louis Royer (1793–1868), sculptor
- Gerda Rubinstein (born 1931), sculptor of figures, birds and animals
- Renate Rubinstein (1929–1990), writer, journalist and columnist
- Michiel de Ruyter (1607–1676), admiral

=== S ===
- Ivo Samkalden (1912–1995), politician, mayor of Amsterdam, 1967–1977
- Jolande Sap (born 1963), politicus
- Annie M.G. Schmidt (1911–1995), writer, the "mother of the Dutch theatrical song"
- Nina Simone (1933–2003), American singer-songwriter, musician and civil rights activist
- Joke Smit (1933–1981), feminist and politician
- Wim Sonneveld (1917–1974), cabaret artist and singer
- Ed Spanjaard (born 1948), classical conductor and pianist
- Gitte Spee (born 1950), children's book illustrator
- Jack Spijkerman (born 1948)
- Jeroen Spitzenberger (born 1976), actor
- Carel Struycken (born 1948), actor
- Jan Pieterszoon Sweelinck (1562–1621), composer, organist, and pedagogue

=== T ===
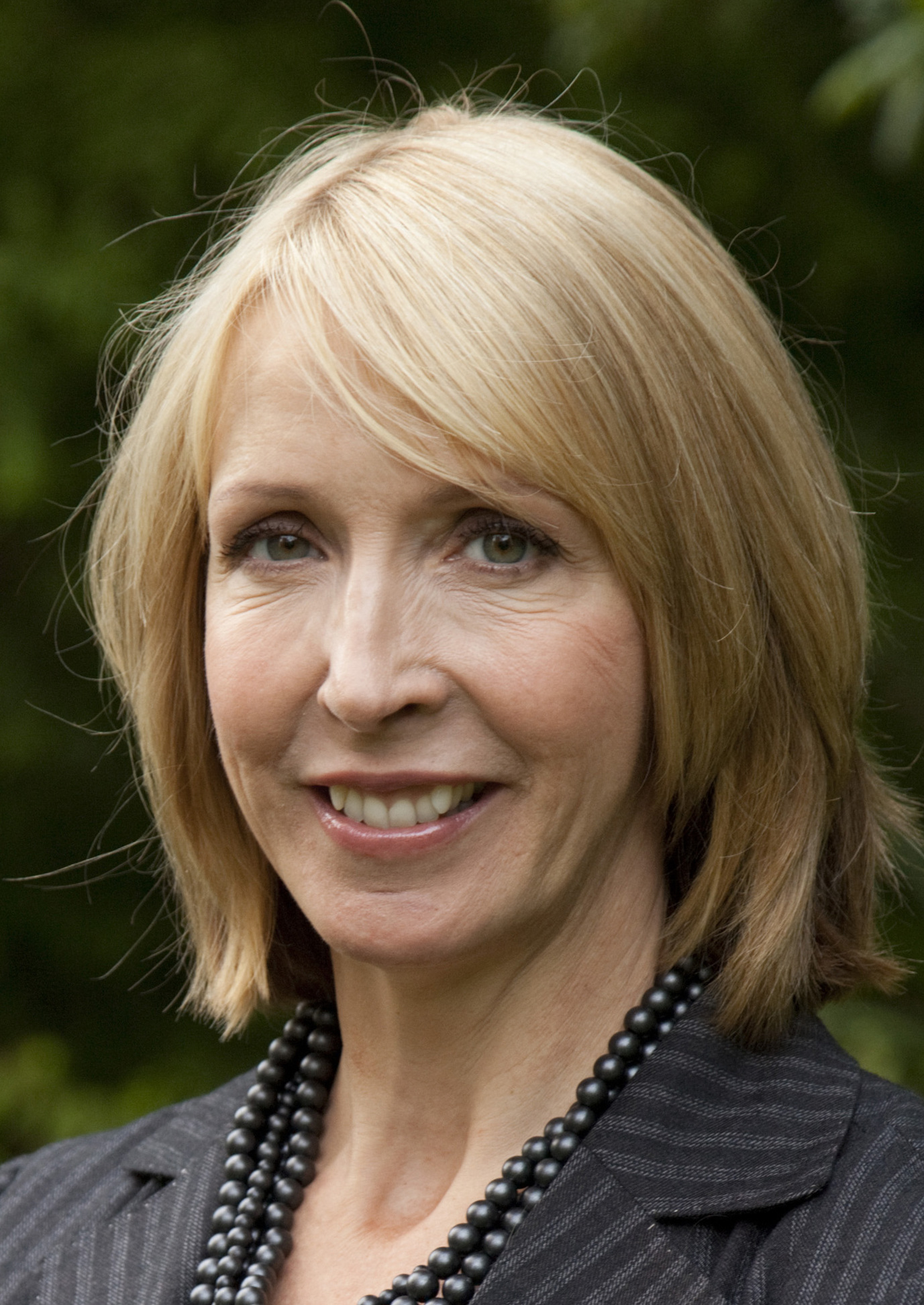
Liesbeth van Tongeren, 2010

- Humberto Tan (born 1965), radio and TV presenter, sports journalist and writer
- Paul Tang (born 1967), politicus
- Gerard Thoolen (1943–1996), actor
- Liesbeth van Tongeren (born 1958), politician and director of Greenpeace Netherlands
- Willem Treub (1858–1931), politician

=== U ===
- Joop den Uyl (1919–1987), politician, prime minister of the Netherlands, 1973–1977

=== V ===
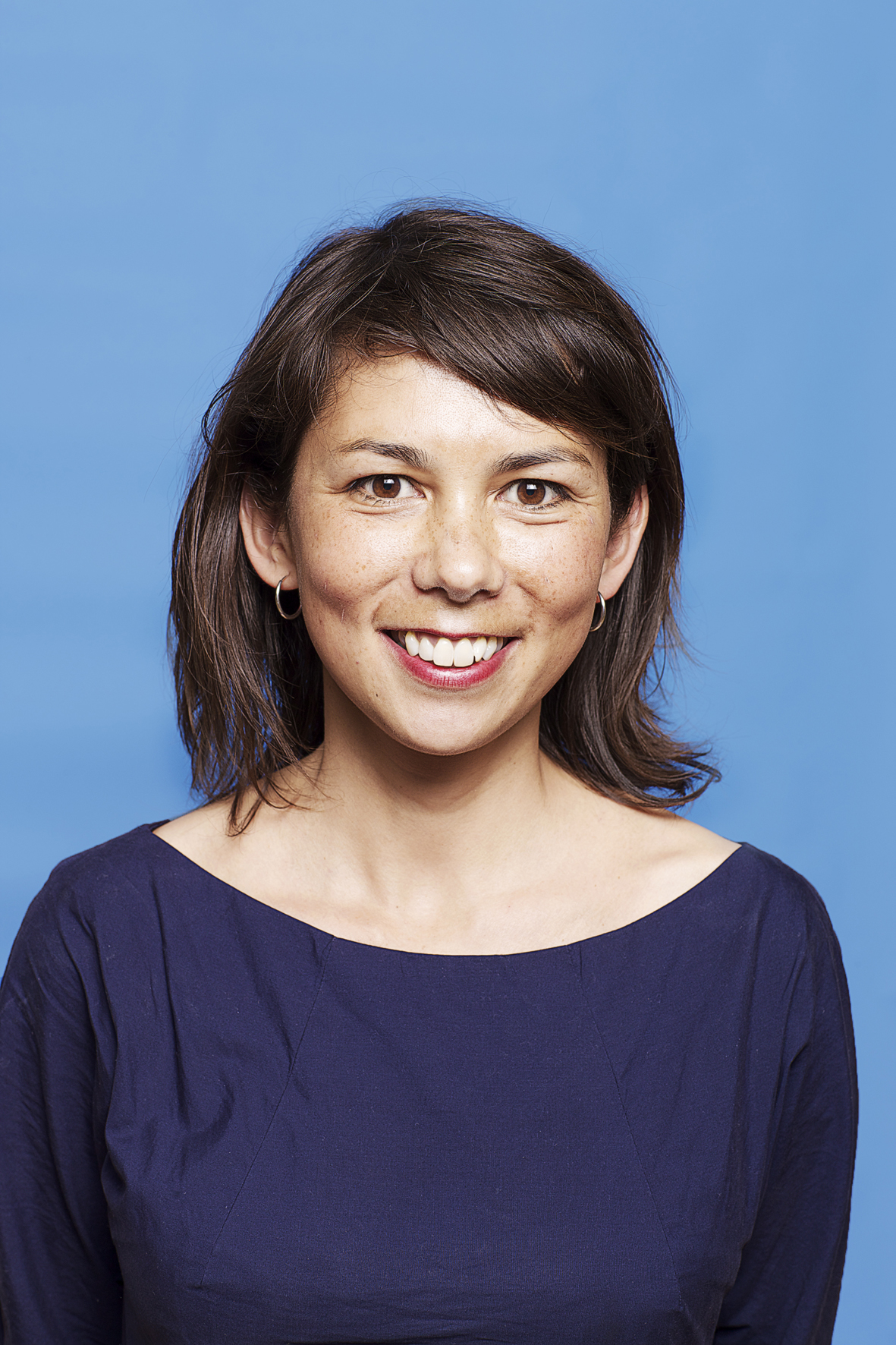
Mei Li Vos

- Kees Vendrik (born 1963), politicus
- Georgina Verbaan (born 1979), actress and singer
- Roué Verveer (born 1972)
- Florian Vijent (1961–1989), football player
- Hendrik Verwoerd (1901–1966), prime minister of South Africa, 1958–1966
- Mart Visser (born 1968), fashion designer
- Joost van den Vondel (1587–1679), poet, writer and playwright
- Joël Voordewind (born 1965), politicus
- Mei Li Vos (born 1970), politician

=== W ===
- Willy Wielek-Berg (1919–2004), translator, film critic, writer and resistance fighter
- Ruud de Wild (born 1969), radio host

== See also ==
- van Dam
- List of Dutch people
- List of Frisians
