= List of Dutch people =

Dutch people who are famous or notable include:

== Arts ==
=== Architecture ===
- Jaap Bakema (1914–1981)
- Hendrik Petrus Berlage (1856–1934)
- Jo van den Broek (1898–1978)
- Jacob van Campen (1596–1657), Dutch Golden Age architect
- Pierre Cuypers (1827–1921)
- Willem Marinus Dudok (1884–1974)
- Aldo van Eyck (1918–1999)
- Lieven de Key (1560–1627), renaissance architect
- Hendrick de Keyser (1565–1621), sculptor and architect
- Rem Koolhaas (born 1944)
- Jacobus Oud (1890–1963)
- Satyendra Pakhale (born 1967)
- Pieter Post (1608–1669), Dutch Golden Age architect
- Gerrit Rietveld (1888–1964)

=== Film ===
- Willeke van Ammelrooy (born 1944), actress
- Antoinette Beumer (born 1962), film director
- Marjolein Beumer (born 1966), actress, screenwriter
- Emmanuel Ohene Boafo (born 1993), actor
- Jan de Bont (born 1943), cinematographer
- Erik-Jan de Boer (born 1967), animation director
- Rene Daalder (1944–2019), director
- Mike van Diem (born 1959), screenwriter and director
- Bracha van Doesburgh (born 1981), actress
- Philip Dorn (1901–1975), actor
- Paul Driessen (born 1940), animator, director
- Bobbi Eden (born 1980), porn actress
- Cyrus Frisch (born 1969), director
- Laura Gemser (born 1950), actress
- Rijk de Gooyer (1925–2011), actor
- Rutger Hauer (1944–2019), actor
- Johannes Heesters (1903–2011), actor
- Tom Holkenborg (Junkie XL) (born 1967), composer
- Carice van Houten (born 1976), actress
- Michiel Huisman (born 1981), actor
- Famke Janssen (born 1964), actress
- Martin Koolhoven (born 1969), screenwriter and director
- John Kraaijkamp, Sr. (1925–2011), actor
- Jeroen Krabbé (born 1944), actor
- Sylvia Kristel (1952–2012), actress
- Rik Launspach (born 1958), actor and writer
- Dick Maas (born 1951), screenwriter and director
- Mimi Mariani (1928–1971), actress
- Anneliese van der Pol (born 1984), actress
- Michael Sanderson (born 1983), filmmaker and director
- Renée Soutendijk (born 1957), actress
- Johanna ter Steege (born 1961), actress
- Monique van de Ven (born 1952), actress
- Paul Verhoeven (born 1938), director
- Wiebe van der Vliet (born 1970), film editor
- Yorick van Wageningen (born 1964), actor
- Alex van Warmerdam (born 1952), actor, screenwriter and director
- Zara Whites (born 1968), former pornographic film actress
- Michaël Dudok de Wit (born 1953), animator, director

=== Music ===
- Thomas Acda (born 1967), singer, actor
- Sharon Den Adel (born 1974), singer of Within Temptation
- Jan Akkerman (born 1946), guitar player
- Amber (born 1969), singer
- Elly Ameling (born 1933), classical music singer
- Louis Andriessen (1939–2021), composer
- Dick Annegarn (born 1952), singer, musician
- Bart Berman (born 1938), pianist, composer
- Marco Borsato (born 1966), singer
- Willem Breuker (1944–2010), jazz musician
- Herman Brood (1946–2001), rock musician and artist
- Frans Brüggen (1934–2014), conductor, recorder player and baroque flautist
- Theo Bruins (1929–1993), pianist, composer
- Armin van Buuren (born 1976), trance DJ
- Ferry Corsten (born 1973), trance DJ
- Esmée Denters (born 1988), singer, made famous through YouTube
- Cristina Deutekom (1931–2014), singer, classical music
- Alphons Diepenbrock (1862–1921), composer
- Anita Doth (born 1971), singer
- Candy Dulfer (born 1969), saxophone player
- Margriet Ehlen (born 1943), composer
- Caro Emerald (born 1981), singer
- Tess Gaerthé (born 1991), actress and singer
- Martin Garrix (born 1996), House DJ
- Afrojack (born 1987), House DJ
- Jan van Gilse (1881–1944), composer
- Boudewijn de Groot (born 1944), singer, actor
- Jack Jersey (1941–1997), producer, composer, singer
- Guus Meeuwis (born 1972), composer, singer
- Stephen van Haestregt (born 1972), drummer of Within Temptation
- Bernard Haitink (1929–2021), conductor Concertgebouworkest
- Alex Van Halen (born 1953), drummer of Van Halen
- Eddie Van Halen (1955–2020), guitarist of Van Halen
- Hardwell (born 1988), house DJ
- Barry Hay (born 1948), singer of Golden Earring
- André Hazes (1951–2004), singer
- Oliver Heldens (born 1995), DJ
- Koen Heldens (born 1986) mixing engineer
- Ilse Huizinga (born 1966), jazz singer
- Dominique van Hulst (born 1981), singer, popularly known as Do
- Janine Jansen (born 1978), violinist
- Ruud Jolie (born 1976), guitarist of Within Temptation
- Gerard Joling (born 1960), singer
- Tom Holkenborg (born 1967), film composer, electronic musician, remixer, composer
- Isabelle van Keulen (born 1966), classical violinist and violist, educator
- Joost Klein (born 1997), singer and rapper
- Tim Kliphuis (born 1974), jazz violinist
- Peter Koelewijn (born 1940), founder of Dutch rock & roll
- Astrid Kruisselbrink (born 1972), composer
- Natalie La Rose (born 1988), singer, dancer and model
- Arjen Anthony Lucassen (born 1960), composer and musician
- Joris de Man (born 1972), composer
- Gwendolyn Masin (born 1977), violinist, author, pedagogue, founder of GAIA Chamber Music Festival
- Willem Mengelberg (1871–1951), conductor
- Rogier van Otterloo (1941–1988), composer
- Willem van Otterloo (1907–1978), composer
- Jetty Paerl (1921–2013), singer (De vogels van Holland)
- Jan Pijnenburg (1955–2026), drummer, session musician
- Willem Pijper (1894–1947), composer
- Abbie de Quant (born 1946), flautist
- André Rieu (born 1949), violinist, conductor, and composer
- Nicky Romero (born 1989), house DJ
- Julius Röntgen (1855–1932), composer
- Ramses Shaffy (1933–2009), singer
- Eva Simons (born 1984), singer-songwriter
- Simone Simons (born 1985), vocalist of Epica
- Peter Slaghuis (1960–1991), disc jockey
- Ray Slijngaard (born 1971), singer and disc jockey
- Jaap Spaanderman (1896–1985), pianist, cellist, conductor
- Martijn Spierenburg (born 1975), keyboardist of Within Temptation
- Jan Pieterszoon Sweelinck (1562–1621), composer and organist
- Anouk Teeuwe (born 1975), singer
- Herman van Veen (born 1945), singer, theater performer
- Jeroen van Veen (born 1969), classical pianist and composer
- Jeroen van Veen (born 1974), bassist of Within Temptation
- Roel van Velzen (born 1978), singer
- Matthijs Vermeulen (1888–1967), composer
- Matthijs Verschoor (born 1955), classical pianist
- Tijs Verwest (born 1969), DJ (better known as DJ Tiësto)
- Klaas de Vries (born 1944), composer
- Edo de Waart (born 1941), conductor
- Johan Wagenaar (1862–1941), composer
- Robert Westerholt (born 1975), guitarist of Within Temptation
- Jaap van Zweden (born 1960), violinist and conductor

=== Visual arts ===
- Pieter van Abeele (1622–1677), medallist
- Bernard Accama (1697–1756), painter
- Karel Appel (1921–2006), painter
- Hendrick Avercamp (1585–1634), painter
- Ludolf Backhuysen (1631–1708), painter
- John Baselmans (born 1954), painter and illustrator
- Helen Berman (born 1936), painter
- Charles Bolsius (1907–1983), painters and print maker
- Hieronymus Bosch (1450–1516), painter
- Ambrosius Bosschaert (1573–1612), painter
- Jan de Bray (1627–1697), painter
- Dick Bruna (1927–2017), graphical artist
- Paul Citroen (1896–1983), painter
- Anton Corbijn (born 1955), photographer
- Aelbert Cuyp (1620–1691), painter
- Theo van Doesburg (1883–1931), painter
- Willem Drost (1630–1680), painter and print maker
- Ger van Elk (1941–2014), sculptor
- M. C. Escher (1898–1972), graphical artist
- Vincent van Gogh (1853–1890), painter
- Jan van Goyen (1596–1656), painter
- Mieke Groot (born 1949), glass artist
- Frans Hals (1580–1666), painter
- Jacoba van Heemskerck (1876–1923), painter, stained glass designer and graphic artist
- Milou Hermus (1947–2021), painter
- Jan van Herwijnen (1889–1965), painter
- Pieter de Hooch (1629–1684), painter
- Helena Klakocar (born 1958), cartoonist
- Willem de Kooning (1904–1997), painter
- Andrea Kruis (born 1962), illustrator
- Jeanne de Loos-Haaxman (1881–1976), art historian
- Han van Meegeren (1889–1947), forger of paintings
- Jacobus Anthonie Meessen (1836–1885), photographer
- Piet Mondrian (1872–1944), painter
- Satyendra Pakhalé (1967), painter
- Rien Poortvliet (1932–1995), painter and illustrator
- Rembrandt van Rijn (1606–1669), painter
- Willem de Rooij (born 1969), contemporary artist
- Jacob van Ruisdael (c. 1628–1682), landscape painter
- Anneke Schat (1942-2024), goldsmith, painter, sculptor
- Geertgen tot Sint Jans (active 1465–1495), painter
- Carolein Smit (born 1960), ceramic art sculptor
- Peter Spier (1927–2017), illustrator
- Jan Steen (1626–1679), painter
- Marten Toonder (1912–2007), comic creator
- Thierry Veltman (born 1939-2023), painter and sculptor
- Johannes Vermeer (1632–1675), painter
- Gisèle d'Ailly van Waterschoot van der Gracht (1912–2013), painter
- Hendrik Nicolaas Werkman (1882–1945), typographer and illustrator
- Fiep Westendorp (1916-2004), illustrator
- Jacob de Wit (1695–1754), painter

=== Writers ===
- A. C. Baantjer (1923–2010), writer of detective fiction
- Paul Biegel (1925–2006), writer of children's books
- Remco Campert (1929–2022), novelist and poet
- Jacob Cats (1577–1660), poet
- Isabelle de Charrière (1740–1805), novelist
- Louis Couperus (1863–1923), novelist and poet
- Willy Corsari (1897–1998), novelist, actress and composer
- Johan Fabricius (1899–1981), novelist, journalist and painter
- Geert Groote (1340–1384)
- Arnon Grünberg (born 1971)
- Hella Haasse (1918–2011), novelist
- Jan de Hartog (1914–2002), novelist and playwright
- Herman Heijermans (1864–1924)
- Willem Frederik Hermans (1921–1995), novelist and physical geographer
- Pieter Corneliszoon Hooft (1581–1647)
- Constantijn Huygens (1596–1687)
- Gerrit Krol (1934–2013), novelist, poet
- Hendrik Willem van Loon (1882–1944)
- Geert Mak (born 1946), writer of history books
- Harry Mulisch (1927–2010), novelist
- Multatuli (1820–1887), novelist
- Nescio (1882–1961)
- Cees Nooteboom (born 1933), novelist
- Willem Oltmans (1925–2004), journalist
- Gerard Reve (1923–2006), novelist
- Tjalie Robinson (1911–1974)
- Annie M.G. Schmidt (1911–1995), children's writer
- Philip Slier (1923–1943)
- Joost van den Vondel (1587–1679), poet and playwright
- Anne de Vries (1904–1964), novelist
- Janwillem van de Wetering (1931–2008), novelist
- Willy Wielek-Berg (1919–2004) film critic, writer, columnist
- Jan Wolkers (1925–2007)
- Yael van der Wouden (born 1987), novelist

== Exploration ==
- Willem Barentsz (c. 1550–1597), several expeditions to Arctic waters; discovered Spitsbergen
- Abraham Blauvelt (1601–1663), Central America
- Adriaen Block (1567–1627), New Netherland
- Hendrik Brouwer (1580–1643), discovered the Roaring Forties
- Olivier Brunel (c. 1540–1585), tried to find a passage around Siberia to China
- Jan Carstenszoon (1600–1700), New Guinea coast, navigated the Gulf of Carpentaria in 1623
- Robert Jacob Gordon (1743–1795), extensively traveled South Africa in the service of the Dutch East India Company
- Dirk Hartog (1580–1621), VOC captain, charted mid-western coast of Australia
- Jacob van Heemskerk (1567–1607), captain of one of Barent's ships on his last fatal expedition
- Cornelis de Houtman (1565–1599), brother to Frederick, established Dutch trading route to the Spice Islands
- Frederick de Houtman (1571–1627), brother to Cornelis, charted several constellations in the southern skies, explored coast of Western Australia
- Willem Janszoon (c. 1570–1630), first European expedition to make landfall on the Australian continent
- Jacob Le Maire (c. 1585–1616), Cape Horn, 1616 circumnavigation
- Cornelius Jacobsen Mey, New Jersey (1614–1620)
- Olivier van Noort (1558–1627), 1598 circumnavigation
- Jacob Quaeckernaeck (1500–1606), reached Japan via Street of Magellan and Moluccas
- Matthijs Quast (died 1641), Japan, Bonin Islands, and legendary islands East of Japan
- Jan Rijp (c. 1570–c. 1613), saved remainder of Willem Barentsz's crew in 1597
- Jakob Roggeveen (1659–1729), First European to reach Easter Island Easter 1722
- Willem Schouten (1567–1625), Cape Horn, 1616 circumnavigation
- Simon van der Stel (1639–1702), explored South Africa North and East of Cape Town
- Abel Tasman (1603–1659), extensive voyages around Australia and southwest Pacific, discovered a.o. Tasmania, New Zealand and Tonga
- François Thijssen (died 1638?), charted 1,000 miles of the Australian South Coast in 1627
- Alexine Tinne (1839–1869), Sahara desert crossing
- Willem de Vlamingh (1640–c. 1698), Western Australia
- Sebald de Weert (1567–1603), discovered Falkland Islands

== Fashion models ==
- Azra Akın (born 1981)
- Wilhelmina Cooper (1940–1980)
- Kim Feenstra (born 1986)
- Bette Franke (born 1989)
- Daphne Groeneveld (born 1994)
- Daniella van Graas (born 1975)
- Tatjana Maul (born 1988)
- Rianne ten Haken (born 1986)
- Marpessa Hennink (born 1964)
- Querelle Jansen (born 1985)
- Kim Kötter (born 1982)
- Doutzen Kroes (born 1985)
- Karen Mulder (born 1970)
- Marcus Schenkenberg (born 1968)
- Iekeliene Stange (born 1984)
- Lara Stone (born 1983)
- Romee Strijd (born 1995)
- Yfke Sturm (born 1981)
- Mark Vanderloo (born 1968)

== Fictional characters ==
- Hans Brinker
- Abraham Van Helsing
- Peter Van Houten

== Historians ==
- Henrica van Erp (c. 1480–1548)
- Pieter Corneliszoon Hooft (1581–1647)
- Johan Huizinga (1872–1945)
- Loe de Jong (1914–2005)
- Jan Gerard Kerkherdere (1677–1738)
- Jan Romein (1893–1962)
- Petrus Scriverius (1576–1660)
- Boudewijn Sirks (born 1947)

== Journalists ==
- Ton Elias
- Henk Hofland
- Arendo Joustra
- Almar Latour
- Geert Mak
- Mart Smeets
- Eva Vlaardingerbroek

== Military ==
- Gaius Julius Civilis, Batavian military commander, leader of the Batavian rebellion
- Jan Pieterszoon Coen (1587–1629), governor general of the Dutch East Indies
- Karel Doorman (1889–1942), naval officer
- Piet Pieterszoon Hein (1577–1629), naval officer
- Frederick Henry, Prince of Orange (1584–1647), general and stadtholder
- J. B. van Heutsz (1851–1924), governor general of the Dutch East Indies
- Hendrick Lucifer (1583–1627), naval officer turned pirate
- Maurice of Nassau, Prince of Orange (1567–1625), general and stadtholder
- Michiel de Ruyter (1607–1676), naval officer
- Cornelis Tromp (1629–1691), naval officer
- Maarten Tromp (1598–1653), naval officer
- Witte Corneliszoon de With (1599–1658), naval officer
- Cornelis de Witt (1623–1672), naval officer and statesman

== Philosophy ==
- Jacobus Arminius (1560–1609), philosopher and theologian
- Isaac Beeckman (1588–1637)
- Evert Willem Beth (1908–1964)
- Cornelius van Bynkershoek (1673–1743), jurist and legal theorist
- Pieter de la Court (1618–1685), economist and political theorist
- Herman Dooyeweerd (1894–1977), philosopher, Vrije Universiteit
- Desiderius Erasmus (1466–1536), writer, polemicist, humanist, Protestant Reformation
- Hugo Grotius (1583–1645), also lawyer, playwright, and poet
- François Hemsterhuis (1721–1790)
- Bernard Mandeville (1670–1733), philosopher, political economist and satirist
- Johannes Jacobus Poortman (1896–1970)
- Johan van den Sande, (1568-1638) lawyer and historian
- Baruch Spinoza (1632–1677), philosopher
- Cornelis Petrus Tiele (1830–1902), theologian and historian of religion

== Politics ==
=== Before 20th century ===
- Pier Gerlofs Donia (1480–1520), warrior and freedom fighter
- William the Silent (1533–1584), stadtholder
- Johan van Oldenbarnevelt (1547–1619), statesman
- Maurice of Nassau, Prince of Orange (1567–1625), general and stadtholder
- Frederick Henry, Prince of Orange (1584–1647), general and stadtholder
- Andries Bicker (1586–1652), regent of Amsterdam, statesman
- Cornelis de Graeff (1599–1664), regent of Amsterdam, statesman
- Andries de Graeff (1611–1678), regent of Amsterdam, statesman
- Jan van Riebeeck (1619–1677), administrator and colonizer of Cape Town
- Cornelis de Witt (1623–1672), statesman
- Johan de Witt (1625–1672), statesman
- William III of Orange (1650–1702), stadtholder and king of England
- Johan Rudolf Thorbecke (1798–1872), prime minister

=== 20th and 21st centuries ===
- Dries van Agt (1931–2024), Prime Minister of the Netherlands (1977–1982)
- Jan Peter Balkenende (born 1956), Prime Minister of the Netherlands (2002–2010)
- Louis Beel (1902–1977), Prime Minister of the Netherlands (1946–1948, 1958–1959)
- Barend Biesheuvel (1920–2001), Prime Minister of the Netherlands (1971–1973)
- Els Borst (1932–2014), Deputy Prime Minister, Minister of Health, Welfare and Sport
- Wouter Bos (born 1963), Deputy Prime Minister, Minister of Finance
- Ben Bot (born 1937), Minister of Foreign Affairs
- Hans van den Broek (born 1936), Minister of Foreign Affairs, European Commissioner (1993–1999)
- Jo Cals (1914–1971), Prime Minister of the Netherlands (1965–1966)
- Hendrikus Colijn (1869–1944), Prime Minister of the Netherlands (1925–1926, 1933–1939)
- Pieter Cort van der Linden (1846–1935), Prime Minister of the Netherlands (1913–1918)
- Ferdinand Domela Nieuwenhuis (1846–1919), first prominent Socialist
- Willem Drees (1886–1988), Prime Minister of the Netherlands (1948–1958)
- Wim Duisenberg (1935–2005), Minister of Finance, President of the European Central Bank (1998–2003)
- Pim Fortuyn (1948–2002), politician, candidate for Prime Minister, assassinated during the 2002 election
- Cornelis van Geelkerken (1901–1979), National-Socialist, co-founder of the NSB
- Dirk Jan de Geer (1870–1960), Prime Minister of the Netherlands (1926–1929, 1939–1940)
- Jaap de Hoop Scheffer (born 1948), Minister of Foreign Affairs, Secretary General of NATO (2004–2009)
- Hans Janmaat (1934–2002), right-wing nationalist
- Piet de Jong (1915–2016), Prime Minister of the Netherlands (1967–1971)
- Wim Kok (1938–2018), Prime Minister of the Netherlands (1994–2002)
- Neelie Kroes (born 1941), Minister of Transport, Public Works and Water Management, European Commissioner for Competition (2004–2014)
- Abraham Kuyper (1837–1920), Prime Minister of the Netherlands (1901–1905)
- Ruud Lubbers (1939–2018), Prime Minister of the Netherlands (1982–1994), United Nations High Commissioner for Refugees (2001–2005)
- Joseph Luns (1911–2002), Minister of Foreign Affairs, Secretary General of NATO (1971–1984)
- Victor Marijnen (1917–1975), Prime Minister of the Netherlands (1963–1965)
- Anton Mussert (1894–1946), National-Socialist, founder of the NSB
- Pieter Oud (1886–1966), Founder of the People's Party for Freedom and Democracy
- Alexander Pechtold (born 1965), Minister for Government Reform and Kingdom Relations
- Jan Pronk (born 1940), Minister for Development Cooperation, Minister of Housing, Spatial Planning and the Environment, Head of the United Nations Mission in Sudan (2004–2006)
- Jan de Quay (1901–1985), Prime Minister of the Netherlands (1959–1963)
- Johan Remkes (born 1951), Deputy Prime Minister, Minister of the Interior
- Charles Ruijs de Beerenbrouck (1873–1936), Prime Minister of the Netherlands (1918–1925, 1929–1933)
- Piet de Ruiter (1939–2014), member of the House of Representatives of the Netherlands between 1971 and 1976
- Mark Rutte (born 1967), Prime Minister of the Netherlands (2010–2024), Secretary General of NATO (since 2024)
- Pieter Jelles Troelstra (1860–1930), political activist for universal suffrage
- Joop den Uyl (1919–1987), Prime Minister of the Netherlands (1973–1977)
- Rita Verdonk (born 1955), Minister for Integration & Immigration
- Hans Wiegel (born 1941), Deputy Prime Minister, Minister of the Interior, Queen's Commissioner of Friesland
- Geert Wilders (born 1963), prominent critic of Islam
- Gerrit Zalm (born 1952), Deputy Prime Minister, Minister of Finance
- Jelle Zijlstra (1918–2001), Prime Minister of the Netherlands (1966–1967)

== Dutch Royal Family ==
- William I of the Netherlands (1772–1843), King
- William II of the Netherlands (1792–1849), King
- William III of the Netherlands (1817–1890), King
- Emma of Waldeck and Pyrmont (1858–1934), Queen consort, Queen regent (1890–1898)
- Wilhelmina of the Netherlands (1880–1962), Queen
- Juliana of the Netherlands (1909–2004), Queen
- Bernhard of Lippe-Biesterfeld (1911–2004), Prince-consort
- Beatrix of the Netherlands (born 1938), Queen
- Prince Claus (1926–2002), Prince-consort
- Princess Irene of the Netherlands (born 1939)
- Princess Margriet of the Netherlands (born 1943)
- Princess Christina of the Netherlands (1947–2019)
- Willem-Alexander of the Netherlands (born 1967), King
- Máxima of the Netherlands (born 1971), Queen consort
- Prince Friso of Orange-Nassau (1968–2013)
- Prince Constantijn of the Netherlands (born 1969)
- Princess Catharina-Amalia of the Netherlands (born 2003)
- Princess Alexia of the Netherlands (born 2005)
- Princess Ariane of the Netherlands (born 2007)

== Science and technology ==
=== Before 20th century ===
- Herman Boerhaave (1668–1738), physician
- C.H.D. Buys Ballot (1817–1890), chemist and meteorologist
- Ludolph van Ceulen (1540–1610), mathematician
- Carolus Clusius (1526–1609), doctor and botanist
- Menno van Coehoorn (1641–1704), military engineer
- Laurens Janszoon Coster (1370–1440), printer
- Cornelius Drebbel (1572–1633), inventor and engineer
- Eise Eisinga (1744–1828), astronomer who built a scale of the Solar System in his house
- David Fabricius (1564–1617), astronomer
- Daniel Gabriel Fahrenheit (1686–1736), German-Polish physicist and engineer, lived most of his life in the Dutch Republic
- Regnier de Graaf (1641–1673), physician and anatomist, who made key discoveries in reproductive biology
- Jacobus Henricus van 't Hoff (1852–1911), chemist
- Coenraad Johannes van Houten (1801–1887), chemist, inventor, known for the Dutch process chocolate
- Christiaan Huygens (1629–1695), mathematician and physicist
- Constantijn Huygens, Jr. (1628–1697; brother of Christiaan), scientific instrument maker, technological chronicler
- Jan Ingenhousz (1730–1799), physiologist, botanist and physicist.
- Zacharias Janssen (1580–88 – pre-1632 to 1638), scientific instrument maker from Middelburg, associated with the invention of the first optical telescope
- Petrus Jacobus Kipp (1808–1864), chemist, inventor of the Kipp apparatus
- Jan Leeghwater (1575–1650), hydraulic engineer and mill builder
- Anton van Leeuwenhoek (1632–1723), scientist
- Hans Lippershey (1570–1619), inventor and scientific instrument maker, associated with the invention of the first telescope
- Pieter van Musschenbroek (1692–1761), Dutch scientist, scientific instrument maker and inventor of Leyden jar
- Frederik Ruysch (1638–1731), botanist and anatomist
- Marie du Saar (1860–1955), ophthalmologist
- Frans van Schooten (1615–1660), mathematician
- Willebrord Snell (1580–1626), astronomer and mathematician
- Thomas Joannes Stieltjes (1856–1894), mathematician
- Simon Stevin (1548–1620), mathematician and engineer
- Jan Swammerdam (1637–1680), scientist
- Franciscus Sylvius (1614–1672), physician and anatomist
- Nicolaes Tulp (1593–1674), physician, surgeon and mayor of Amsterdam
- Gustav de Vries (1866–1934), mathematician
- Hugo de Vries (1848–1937), geneticist
- Johannes Diderik van der Waals (1837–1923), physicist
- Nicolaes Witsen (1641–1717), statesman, shipbuilder, geographer and cartographer
- Hendrik Zwaardemaker (1857–1930), scientist

=== 20th century ===
- Wiebe Bijker (born 1951), social scientist
- Nicolaas Bloembergen (1920–2017), physicist
- Luitzen Egbertus Jan Brouwer (1881–1966), mathematician
- Nicolaas Govert de Bruijn (1918–2012), mathematician
- Hendrik Casimir (1909–2000), physicist
- Paul J. Crutzen (1933–2021), atmospheric chemist
- David van Dantzig (1900–1959), mathematician
- Paul Ehrenfest (1880–1933), physicist
- Chaim Elata (born 1929), Israeli professor of mechanical engineering, President of Ben-Gurion University of the Negev, and Chairman of the Israel Public Utility Authority for Electricity
- George Uhlenbeck (1900–1988), theoretical physicist
- Samuel Goudsmit (1902–1978), Dutch-American physicist
- Dirk Brouwer (1902–1966), astronomer
- Cornelis Johannes van Houten (1920–2002), astronomer
- Tom Gehrels (1925–2011), astronomer
- Willem Johan Kolff (1911–2009), physician and inventor
- Peter Debye (1884–1966), chemist
- Robbert Dijkgraaf (born 1960), physicist
- Edsger Dijkstra (1930–2002), computer scientist
- David Adriaan van Dorp (1915–1995), chemist
- Eugène Dubois (1858–1944), paleontologist and anatomist
- Christiaan Eijkman (1858–1930), physician and pathologist
- Willem Einthoven (1860–1927), physician
- Anthony Fokker (1890–1939), aviation engineer
- Valerie Frissen (born 1960), social scientist
- Andre Geim (born 1958), Russian-born British-Dutch physicist
- Richard D. Gill (born 1951), mathematician
- Jaap Haartsen (born 1963), inventor of Bluetooth
- Arend Heyting (1898–1980), mathematician
- Gerardus 't Hooft (born 1946), physicist
- Heike Kamerlingh Onnes (1853–1926), physicist
- Jacobus Kapteyn (1851–1922), astronomer
- Willem Hendrik Keesom (1878–1956), physicist
- Hendrik Anthony Kramers (1894–1952), physicist
- Pieter Kok (born 1972), physicist
- Tjalling Koopmans (1910–1985), economist
- Gerard Kuiper (1905–1973), astronomer
- Hendrik Lorentz (1853–1928), physicist
- Arend Lijphart (born 1936), political scientist
- Wilhelmina Anna Lub (1900–1986), physicist who worked with Marie Curie
- Simon van der Meer (1925–2011), physicist
- Bram Moolenaar (born 1961), computer programmer, author of text-editor Vim
- Wubbo Ockels (1946–2014), astronaut
- Jan Oort (1900–1992), astronomer
- Lou Ottens (1926-2021), inventor of the compact cassette
- Anton Pannekoek (1873–1960), astronomer
- Guido van Rossum (born 1956), computer programmer, inventor of the Python programming language
- Carel van Schaik (born 1953), primatologist
- Maarten Schmidt (1929–2022), astronomer
- Kees Schouhamer Immink (born 1946), engineer, development of CD, DVD and Blu-ray
- Willem de Sitter (1872–1934), mathematician, physicist and astronomer
- Andrew S. Tanenbaum (born 1944), Computer scientist, developer of Minix which inspired Linus Torvalds to write Linux
- Hendrik Tennekes (1936–2021), aerodynamics professor
- Jan Tinbergen (1903–1994), economist
- Nico Tinbergen (1907–1988), ecologist
- Martinus J. G. Veltman (1931–2021), physicist
- Frans de Waal (1948–2024), primatologist
- Bartel Leendert van der Waerden (1903–1996), mathematician
- Pieter Zeeman (1865–1943), physicist
- Frits Zernike (1888–1966), physicist

== Sports ==
- Estella Agsteribbe (1909–1943), Olympic champion gymnast (team combined exercises)
- Christijan Albers (born 1979), Formula 1 driver
- Ryan Babel (born 1986), football player
- Raymond van Barneveld (born 1967), darts player
- Marco van Basten (born 1964), manager and retired football player
- Stan van Belkum (born 1961), water polo player
- Xander Bogaerts (born 1992), MLB player for the Boston Red Sox
- Carina Benninga (born 1962), field hockey player, Olympic champion, bronze
- Dennis Bergkamp (born 1969), manager and retired football player
- Juliette Bergmann (born 1958), IFBB pro bodybuilder
- Jorrit Bergsma (born 1985), speed skater
- Det de Beus (1958–2013), field hockey goalkeeper
- Fanny Blankers-Koen (1918–2004), athlete
- Jan Blokhuijsen (born 1989), speed skater
- Rens Blom (born 1977), 2005 world champion pole vaulter
- Frank de Boer (born 1970), retired football player
- Ronald de Boer (born 1970), retired football player
- Floris Jan Bovelander (born 1966), field hockey player
- Mart Bras (born 1950), water polo player
- Jacques Brinkman (born 1966), field hockey player
- Femke Broeders-Bol (born 2000), athlete
- Giovanni van Bronckhorst (born 1975), football player
- Inge de Bruijn (born 1974), swimmer
- Roel Buikema (born 1976), football player
- Theun Busser (born 1952), speed skater
- Ton Buunk (born 1952), water polo player
- Lex Cazemier (born 1958), speed skater
- Johan Cruijff (1947–2016), retired football player and former manager
- Edgar Davids (born 1973), football player
- Marc Delissen (born 1965), field hockey player
- Memphis Depay (born 1994), football player
- Cees Jan Diepeveen (born 1956), field hockey player
- Ellen van Dijk (born 1987), road and track cyclist, four-time world champion
- Virgil van Dijk (born 1991), football player
- Sjoukje Dijkstra (1942–2024), figure skater
- Robert Doornbos (born 1981), Formula One driver
- Eva Duldig (born 1938), Austrian-born Australian and Dutch tennis player, author
- Francisco Elson (born 1976), NBA player for Utah Jazz and San Antonio Spurs
- Jacco Eltingh (born 1970), tennis player
- Arie Eriks (born 1947), speed skater
- Max Euwe (1901–1981), chess player
- Didi Gregorius (born 1990), MLB player for New York Yankees
- Louis van Gaal (born 1951), football player and manager
- Dan Gadzuric (born 1978), NBA player for Milwaukee Bucks
- Anton Geesink (1934–2010), judoka
- Yuri van Gelder (born 1983), gymnast
- Yvonne van Gennip (born 1964), speed skater
- Co Giling (born 1950), speed skater
- Anish Giri (born 1994), chess player
- Ton Groot (born 1942), speed skater
- Stefan Groothuis (born 1981), speed skater
- Anky van Grunsven (born 1968), dressage
- Ruud Gullit (born 1962), football player and coach
- Paul Haarhuis (born 1966), tennis player
- Eddy Hamel (1902–1943), Jewish-American soccer player for Dutch club AFC Ajax who was killed by the Nazis in Auschwitz concentration camp
- Willem van Hanegem (born 1944), football player and coach
- Wil Hartog (born 1948), Grand Prix motorcycle racer
- Jimmy Floyd Hasselbaink (born 1972), football player
- John Heitinga (born 1983), football player
- Guus Hiddink (born 1946), manager and retired football player
- Ellen Hoog (born 1986), field hockey player
- Pieter van den Hoogenband (born 1978), swimmer
- Lenie van der Hoorn (born 1948), speed skater
- Ernesto Hoost (born 1965), kickboxer
- Emiel Hopman (1963–2023), speed skater
- Jesper Hospes (born 1988), speed skater
- Lammert Huitema (born 1961), speed skater
- Jan Janssen (born 1940), cyclist
- Bob de Jong (born 1976), speed skater
- Rein Jonker (born 1950), speed skater
- Rhian Ket (born 1983), speed skater
- Niek Kimmann (born 1996), champion BMX rider
- Jelle Klaasen (born 1984), darts player
- Bep van Klaveren (1907–1992), boxer
- Richard van Kempen (born 1964), speed skater
- Pien Keulstra (born 1993), speed skater and triathlete
- Patrick Kluivert (born 1976), football player
- Sjinkie Knegt (born 1989), short-track speed skater
- Ronald Koeman (born 1963), football player and manager
- Ada Kok (born 1947), swimmer
- Richard Krajicek (born 1971), tennis player
- Sven Kramer (born 1986), speed skater
- Jan Eise Kromkamp (born 1955), speed skater
- Jan Roelof Kruithof (1936–2026), speed skater
- Ties Kruize (born 1952), field hockey player
- Dirk Kuyt (born 1980), football player
- Nico Landeweerd (born 1954), water polo player
- Ellen van Langen (born 1966), athlete
- Elka de Levie (1905–1979), Olympic champion gymnast (team combined exercises)
- Gabriël Lomans(born 2003), wheel gymnast
- Arie Luyendyk (born 1953), race car driver
- Joost Luiten (born 1986), golfer
- Rie Mastenbroek (1919–2003), swimmer
- Rixt Meijer (born 1982), speed skater
- Loek van Mil (1984–2019), baseball player
- Lion van Minden (1880–1944), Olympic fencer, who was killed in the Auschwitz concentration camp
- Leontien van Moorsel (born 1970), cyclist
- Bob Mulder (born 1974), football player
- Boyito Mulder (born 1991), figure skater
- Dustley Mulder (born 1985), football player
- Eefke Mulder (born 1977), field hockey player
- Erwin Mulder (born 1989), football player
- Jan Mulder (born 1945), football player
- Lau Mulder (1927–2006), field hockey player
- Michel Mulder (born 1986), speed skater
- Ronald Mulder (born 1986), speed skater
- Teun Mulder (born 1981), cyclist
- Youri Mulder (born 1969), football player
- Bennie Muller (1938–2024), football player
- Jos Niesten (born 1945), marathon speed skater
- Ruud van Nistelrooy (born 1976), football player
- Teun de Nooijer (born 1976), field hockey player
- Helena Nordheim (1903–1943), Olympic champion gymnast (team combined exercises)
- Simon Okker (1881–1944), Olympic fencer killed in Auschwitz
- Tom Okker (born 1944), tennis player, won 1973 French Open Men's Doubles (w/John Newcombe), 1976 US Open Men's Doubles (w/Marty Riessen), highest world ranking # 3 in singles, and # 1 in doubles
- Tinus Osendarp (1916–2002), athlete
- Alistair Overeem (born 1980), MMA fighter and former kickboxer
- Robin van Persie (born 1983), football player
- Mathieu van der Poel (born 1995), professional cyclist
- Annie Polak (1906–1943), Olympic champion gymnast (team combined exercises)
- Henk Portengen (born 1948), speed skater
- Daniël de Ridder (born 1984), football player, forward winger/attacking midfielder (Wigan Athletic and U21 national team)
- Reinier de Ridder (born 1990), ONE Championship and UFC fighter
- Frank Rijkaard (born 1962), football player and manager
- Lucia Rijker (born 1967), boxer and kickboxer
- Dorian van Rijsselberghe (born 1988), windsurfer
- Rintje Ritsma (born 1970), speed skater
- Arjen Robben (born 1984), football player
- Johnny Roeg (1910–2003), football player, striker for Ajax
- Gianni Romme (born 1973), speed skater
- Henri Ruitenberg (born 1957), speed skater (René's brother)
- René Ruitenberg (born 1970), speed skater (Henri's brother)
- Wim Ruska (1940–2015), judoka
- Bas Rutten (born 1965), mixed martial artist
- Edwin van der Sar (born 1970), football player
- Ard Schenk (born 1944), speed skater
- Dafne Schippers (born 1992), athlete
- Clarence Seedorf (born 1976), football player
- Klasina Seinstra (born 1968), speed skater
- Aryeh "Arie" Selinger (born 1937), volleyball player & coach
- Avital Selinger (born 1959), Olympic silver medallist
- Gerald Sibon (born 1974), football player
- Judijke Simons (1904–1943), Olympic champion gymnast (team combined exercises)
- Emil Sitoci (born 1985), pro wrestler
- Arne Slot (born 1987), football manager
- Jan Smeekens (born 1985), speed skater
- Rutger Smith (born 1981), athlete
- Rik Smits (born 1966), NBA player
- Marinde Smolders (born 2000), wheel gymnast
- Wesley Sneijder (born 1984), football player
- Yuri Solinger (born 1979), speed skater
- Petra van Staveren (born 1966), swimmer
- Betty Stöve (born 1945), tennis player
- Arnold Stam (born 1968), speed skater
- Sjaak Swart (born 1938), footballer
- Bernard D. H. Tellegen (1900–1990), electrical engineer, inventor, known for Tellegen's theorem in circuit theory
- Carole Thate (born 1971), field hockey player
- Jan Timman (born 1951), chess player
- Regilio Tuur (born 1967), boxer
- Jan Uitham (1925–2019), speed skater
- Jochem Uytdehaage (born 1976), speed skater
- Wilma van den Berg (born 1947), sprinter, competed at the 1968 and 1972 Summer Olympics (which she left in the middle, in sympathy with the Israelis after the Munich Massacre)
- Rick VandenHurk (born 1985), baseball player
- Arnold Vanderlyde (born 1963), boxer
- Jim Vandermeer (born 1980), Dutch-Canadian ice hockey player
- Bart Veldkamp (born 1967), speed skater
- Kees Verkerk (born 1942), speed skater
- Martin Verkerk (born 1978), tennis player
- Jos Verstappen (born 1972), F1 Grand Prix racing driver
- Max Verstappen (born 1997), F1 Grand Prix racing driver
- Koen Verweij (born 1990), speed skater
- Niels Vink (born 2002), champion wheelchair tennis player
- Bert van Vlaanderen (born 1964), long-distance runner
- Klaas Vriend (1952–2019), speed skater
- Foske Tamar van der Wal (born 1986), speed skater
- Marjet Waldram, wheel gymnast
- Johan Wardenier (born 1947), speed skater
- Bennie van der Weide (born 1942), speed skater
- Gregory van der Wiel (born 1988), football player
- Harm Wiersma (born 1953), checkers player
- Dries van Wijhe (born 1945), speed skater
- Hans Wouda (born 1941), water polo player
- Marcel Wouda (born 1972), swimmer
- Joop Zoetemelk (born 1946), cyclist
- Epke Zonderland (born 1986), gymnast

== Other ==
- Willem Doorn (1836–1908), for 33 years vicar of Nobel Street Church in The Hague
- Henry VI, Holy Roman Emperor (1165–1197), King of Germany (1190–1197), Holy Roman Emperor (1191–1197), King of Sicily (1194–1197)
- Pope Adrian VI (1522–1523), pope from 1522 to 1523
- Hendrikje van Andel-Schipper (1890–2005), oldest person in the world from 29 May 2004 to 30 August 2005
- Corrie ten Boom (1892–1983), Christian activist during the Holocaust
- Aaron Abbas (18th century), Jewish editor and printer
- Geert Adriaans Boomgaard, (1788–1899) officially first ever validated supercentenarian
- Evert Dudok (born 1959), president of EADS Astrium Space Transportation
- Gretta Duisenberg (born 1942), pro-Palestinian activist and the wife of Wim Duisenberg
- Esmée van Eeghen (1918–1944), Dutch resistance member
- Jacob Eelkens, first commander of the first Dutch fort in America (Fort Nassau)
- Jetske van den Elsen (born 1972), television presenter
- Caro van Eyck (1915-1979), stage and television actress
- Ferry Piekart (born 1974), writer on children's games
- Anne Frank (1929–1945), diarist in World War II Amsterdam
- Harry Gideonse (1901–1985), American President of Brooklyn College, and Chancellor of the New School for Social Research
- Alfred Henry (Freddy) Heineken (1923–2002), commercial mastermind of the Heineken Imperium; grandson of the founder of Heineken
- Mata Hari (1876–1917), spy
- Frans van der Hoff (born 1939), co-founder of Max Havelaar, the first Fairtrade certification initiative
- Aletta Jacobs (1854–1929), first Dutch female to complete a university degree and the first female physician
- Nicolaas Godfried van Kampen (1776-1839) Dutch Mennonite deacon
- Frederik Lauesen (born 1972), television presenter
- Marinus van der Lubbe (1909–1934), see: Reichstag fire
- George Maduro (1916–1945), Dutch Resistance member; the miniature city of Madurodam is named after him, as well as the Maduroplein area in Scheveningen, in The Hague
- Adrienne van Melle-Hermans (1931–2007), peace activist
- Maria van Pallaes (1587–1664), philanthropist in Utrecht
- Anton Philips (1874–1951), co-founder of the Royal Philips Electronics
- Gerard Philips (1858–1942), co-founder of the Royal Philips Electronics
- Roel Pieper (born 1956), businessman and professor
- Jan Sloot (1945–1999), inventor
- Joran van der Sloot (born 1987), convicted murderer
- Peter Stuyvesant (1592–1672), governor of the New Netherland
- Jason Walters (born 1985), sentenced to 15 years in prison on charges related to Islamic terrorism

== See also ==
- De Grootste Nederlander (The Greatest Dutchman)
- List of Dutch Americans
- List of Dutch Britons
- List of Dutch Indos
- List of Dutch Israelis
- List of Dutch Jews
- List of Dutch people of Lebanese descent
- List of Dutch people of Moroccan descent
- List of Dutch people of Turkish descent
- List of Dutch sportspeople
- List of Dutch supercentenarians
- List of Dutch vegetarians
- List of Frisians
- List of people from Amsterdam
- List of people from the Dutch Golden Age
