= Lu Jianjun (Chinese painter) =

Chinese painter

- Born: 1960 (age 65–66); Hangzhou, Zhejiang, China

Lu Jianjun (born 1960, Hangzhou) is a Chinese modernist painter known for his contributions to contemporary art. His works explore themes of realism and cultural identity, with many of his paintings depicting Chinese women surrounded by traditional Chinese furniture, jewelry, ceramics, and other antique objects, and draws inspiration from Flemish and Dutch artists, as well as Russian academic painters.

== Biography ==
Lu Jianjun studied classical oil painting at Shandong Fine Art College in 1986 and later at the Central Academy of Fine Arts in Beijing in 1996. The rigorous technical training in traditional media and materials he received in China is comparable to late 19th century Russian academicism, with similarities between Jianjun's work and the work of Russian academic figures such as Ilya Repin. He earned his degree at the Central Academy of Fine Arts, and later worked as a professor at Shandong Academy of Painting. He moved to San Francisco in 1999 and traveled around The United States and Europe, where he saw paintings by European masters in person for the first time. Lu Jianjun has won various awards for his work including the Outstanding Award for Graduation Work from China Central Academy, the China National Art Exhibition Award of Excellence, the Japanese Art Association Award, and the National Outstanding Award in Oil Painting (China). His work has been displayed in museums such as the China National Museum, the Museum of Japan, the Nagasaki Prefectural Museum, the Fukuoka Art Museum, and the Virginia Museum of Fine Arts.
