= Frissen =

Frissen is a surname. Notable people with the surname include:

- Jerry Frissen (born 1964), American comic book writer and toy designer
- Jos Frissen (1892–1982), Dutch painter
- Léon Frissen (born 1950), Dutch politician
- Valerie Frissen (born 1960), Dutch academic
