= Eddy Hamel =

American soccer player and Holocaust victim

- Hamel in 1925

Personal information
- Full name: Edward Hamel
- Date of birth: October 21, 1902
- Place of birth: New York City, New York, United States
- Date of death: April 30, 1943 (aged 40)
- Place of death: Auschwitz-Birkenau, German-occupied Poland
- Position: Right winger

Youth career
- 1917-1920: AFC

Senior career*
Years	Team	Apps	(Gls)
1920–1922	AFC	?	(?)
1922–1930	Ajax	125	(8)

Managerial career
- 1932–1933: Alcmaria Victrix
- * Club domestic league appearances and goals

Eddy Hamel (October 21, 1902 – April 30, 1943) was an American soccer player who played as a right winger for Dutch club AFC Ajax. Hamel was the first Jewish player for Ajax. He was murdered by the Nazis in 1943 in Auschwitz concentration camp.

== Background ==
Hamel was born in New York City, New York to Moses Hamel, a diamond polisher, and his wife Eva. They were Jewish immigrants from the Netherlands, who had arrived in the US in 1901. They moved back to Amsterdam with Hamel when he was six months old, in 1903. In 1928, Hamel married Johanna Wijnberg, and in 1938 they had twin boys, Paul and Robert.

== Soccer career ==
As a youth, he played for Amsterdamsche FC (AFC).

He played for AFC Ajax from 1922 until 1930. He appeared in 125 matches as a right winger, and scoring 8 goals. Die-hard Ajax supporters call themselves "Joden" – Dutch for "Jews" – a nickname that reflects both the team's and the city's Jewish heritage. This nickname for Ajax fans dates back to before World War II, when Amsterdam was home to most of the Netherlands' 140,000 Jews.

Hamel became a first team regular for Ajax. He was the first Jewish player (as well as the first American) to play for first team Ajax. To date, only six other Jewish soccer players have followed in his footsteps – Johnny Roeg, Bennie Muller, Sjaak Swart, Rolf Leeser, Daniël de Ridder and Ilan Boccara. Hamel was a fan favorite, and was cited by pre-World War II club legend Wim Anderiesen as part of the strongest line-up he ever played with. He had his own fan club in the 1920s, which would line up on his side of the field at the beginning of every game, and then switch sides to be on his side of the field in the second half.

After his retirement as a player, Hamel managed Alcmaria Victrix for three years and continued to play in an Ajax veteran squad.

== Arrest and killing by the Nazis ==
Hamel was also the club's only war victim who played for the first team of Ajax.

Local fascist groups assisted in rounding up Jews after Nazi Germany invaded the Netherlands in May 1940. Despite his American citizenship, in late 1942 Hamel was detained by the Nazis because he was a Jew. He spent four months doing hard labor at Birkenau. After he was found to have a swollen mouth abscess during an inspection, the Nazis murdered him in the gas chambers in Auschwitz concentration camp on April 30, 1943.

In the TV documentary Auschwitz: The Forgotten Evidence, fellow inmate Leon Greenman said he was in front of Hamel when Hamel told him he had an abscess in his mouth, while in a regular medical selection line, and that while Greenman passed that selection Hamel was sent to the gas chambers because of his abscess. He was one of several Jewish soccer players – many of whom were Olympians – who were murdered by the Nazis.

== See also ==
- List of select Jewish football (association) players
