= Pieter Haaxman =

Painter from the Netherlands (1854-1937)

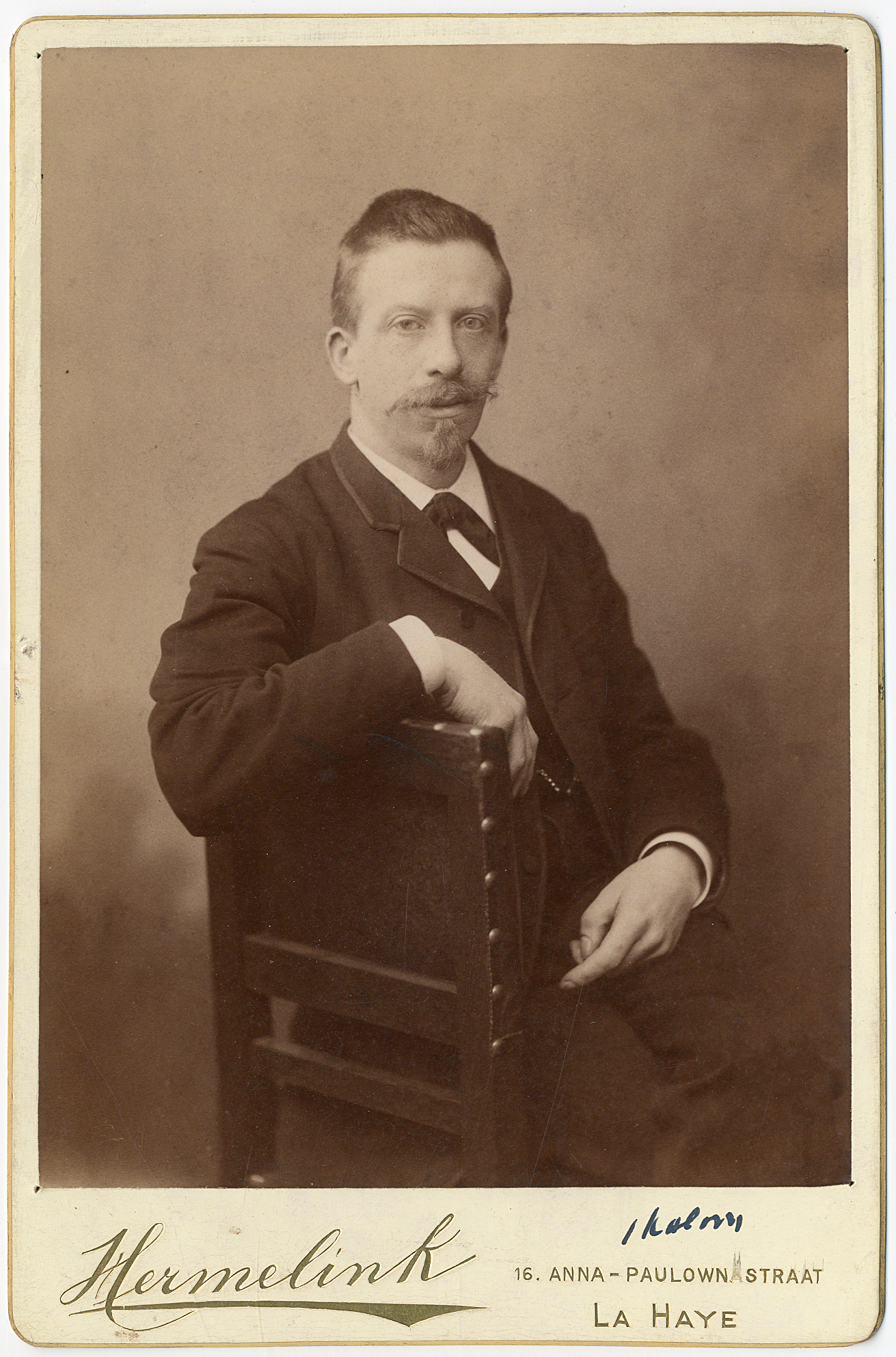
- Born: 24 May 1854; The Hague, Netherlands
- Died: 31 January 1937 (aged 82); Haarlem, Netherlands
- Occupation: Painter

Pieter Haaxman (24 May 1854, in The Hague – 31 January 1937, in Haarlem), was a Dutch painter whose work is held in museum collections in the Netherlands.

== Biography ==
He was born in The Hague, Netherlands in 1854, the son of the coach maker Andries Jacobus Haaxman and became pupil of Herman ten Kate (1822–1891) at the Rijksakademie van Beeldende Kunsten there and became a member of the Pulchri studio and Arti et Amicitiae. He is known for portraits and genre works, but he created paintings with a classical look as well.

Haaxman's miniatures were commissioned by Queen Emma and Queen Wilhelmina of The Netherlands and he painted their portraits. His work can be found in the collections of the Rijksmuseum, Amsterdam, the Kunstmuseum, The Hague and the Museum Boijmans van Beuningen, Rotterdam.

He was related to art historian Jeanne de Loos-Haaxman and Delft painter Pieter Alardus Haaxman.

In his later years, the artist lived in Haarlem. He died there in 1937 at 82 years of age.

== Gallery ==
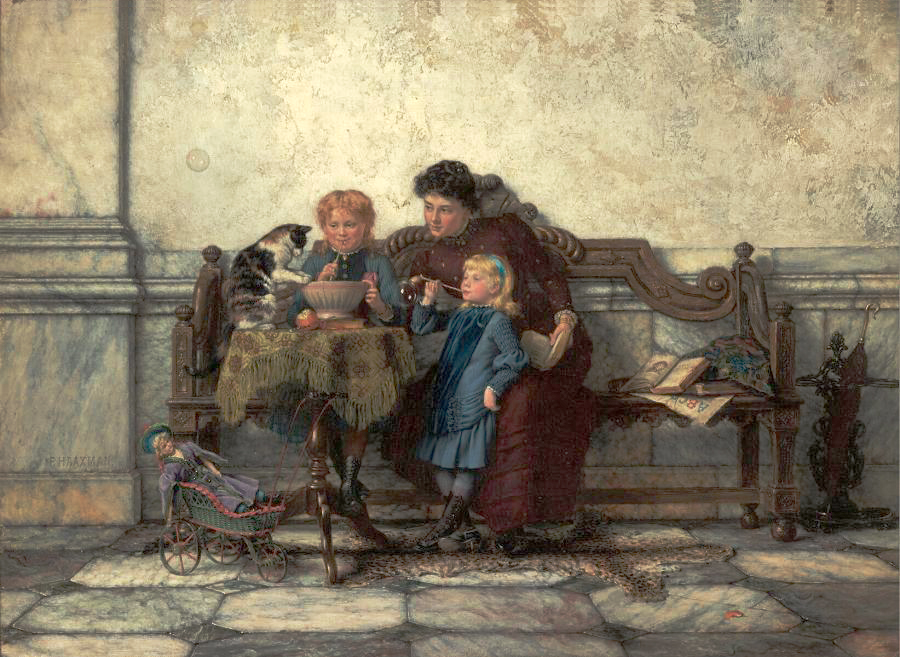
Blowing Soap Bubbles by Pieter Haaxman (1854-1937)

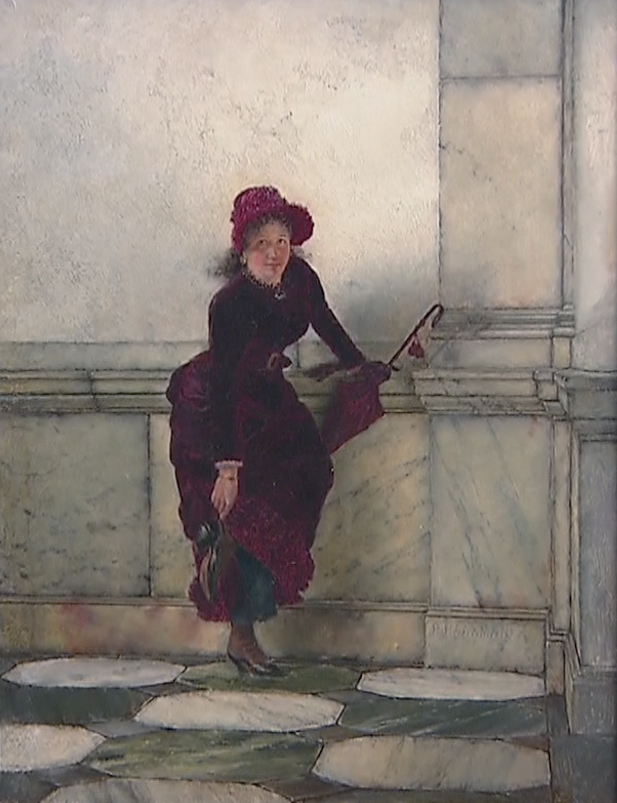
Young woman adjusting her shoe, by Pieter Haaxman (1854-1937)

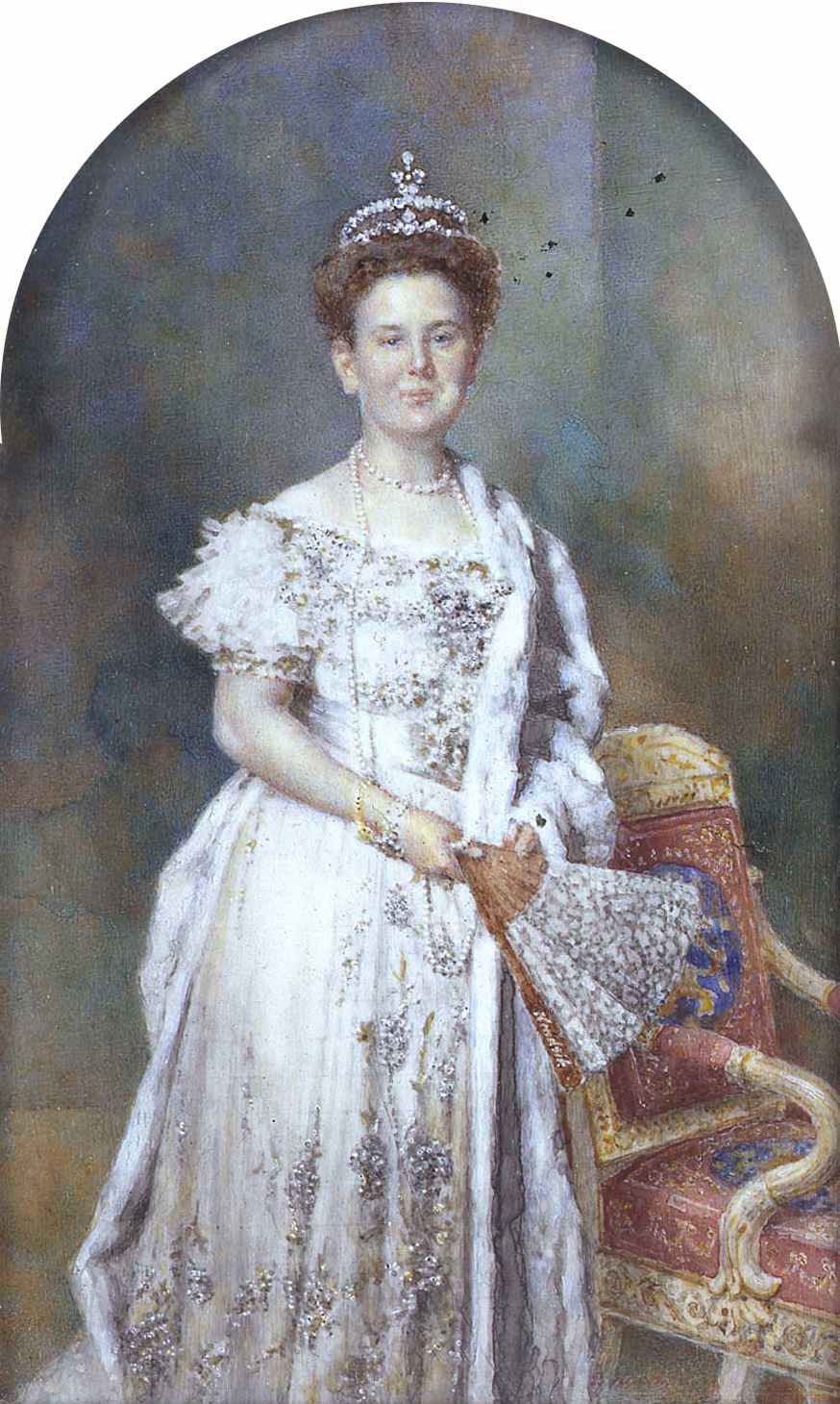
[Queen] Wilhelmina by Pieter Haaxman (1854-1937)

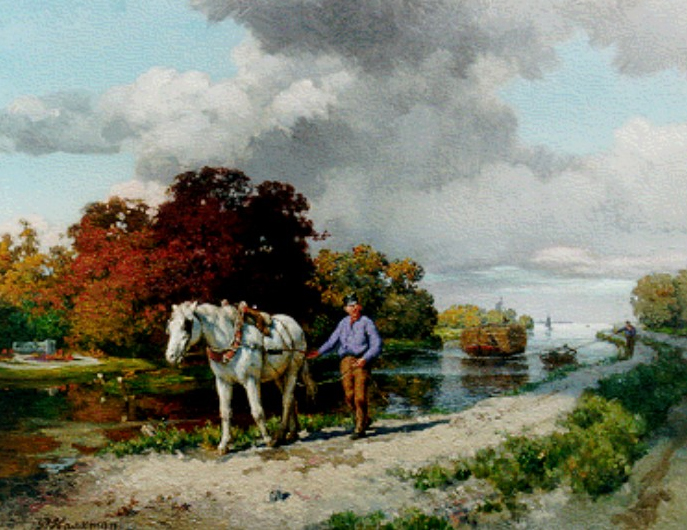
Op het jaagpad Pieter Haaxman (1854-1937)

== Selected works ==
- Daydreams (painting on panel)
- On the Tow Path
- Blowing Soap Bubbles
- Young Woman Adjusting Her Shoe
- Wilhelmina
- The Mandolin Player (oil on panel)
