= Aaron Abbas =

18th-century Dutch Jewish editor and printer

Aaron Abbas was a Jewish editor and printer in Amsterdam, at the beginning of the eighteenth century. He was the publisher of two works:

The first was Aaron Peraḥyah's responsa, known under the name of "Peraḥ Maṭṭeh Aharon" (Amsterdam, 1703), the title-page of which is adorned with artistic woodcuts representing scenes from the life of the high priest Aaron. The book contains, in the nature of a preface, a dedicatory epistle, by Azriel ha-Kohen Peraḥyah, addressed to Isaac Emanuel Belmonte and Solomon Curiel.

The second was the Talmudic treatise Ḥagigah (Amsterdam, 1706), which seems to have formed part of an attempted complete edition of the Babylonian Talmud by various editors.
