= Jan Elfring =

Dutch footballer

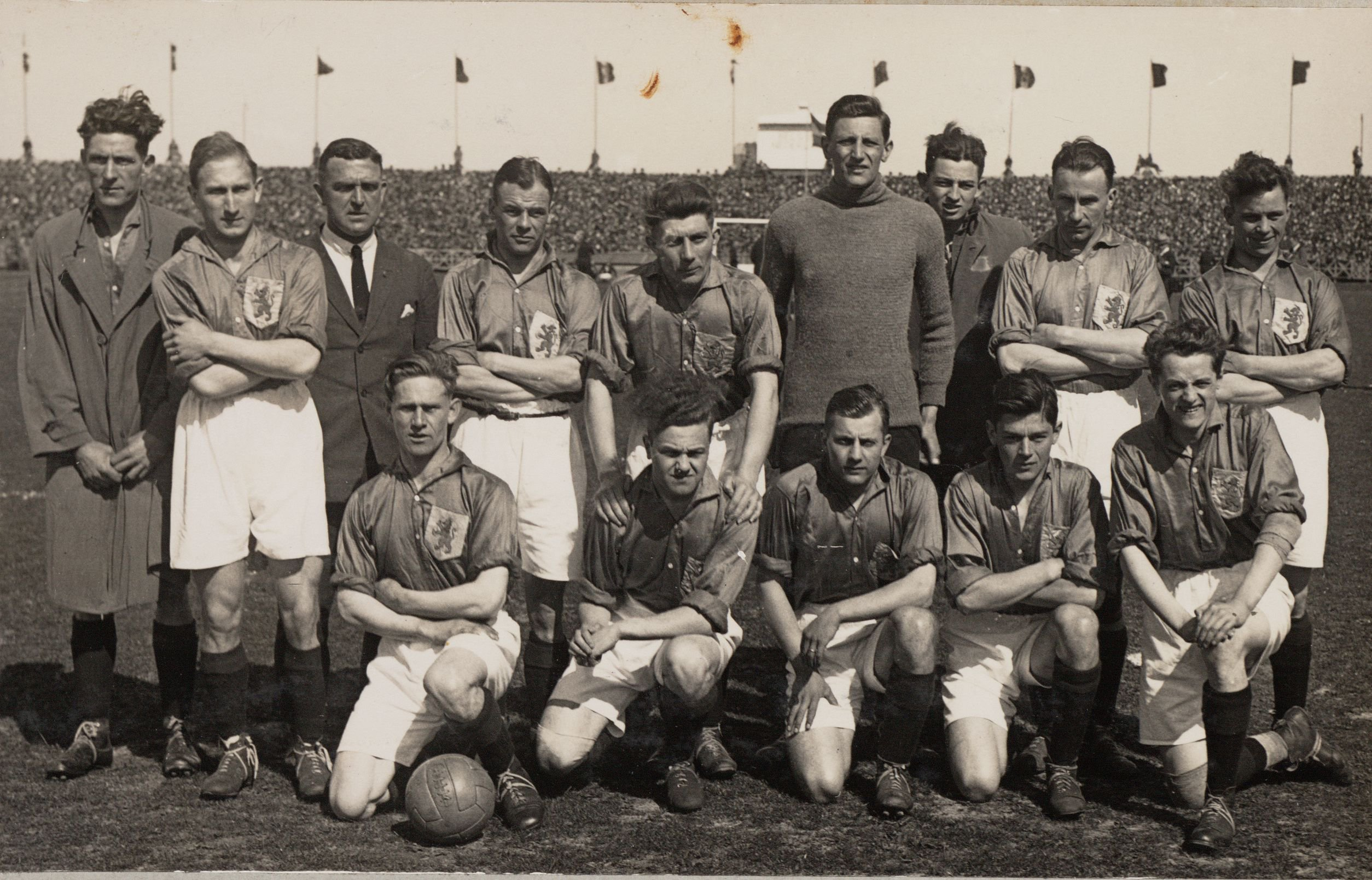
- Elfring (2nd from left standing) in 1927

Personal information
- Full name: Johan Gerard Hendrik Elfring
- Date of birth: 8 February 1902
- Place of birth: Alkmaar, Netherlands
- Date of death: 4 September 1977 (aged 75)
- Place of death: Apeldoorn, Netherlands
- Position: Winger

Senior career*
Years	Team	Apps	(Gls)
–1924	Go Ahead 1918		
1925–1929	Alcmaria Victrix		
1929–1938	Robur et Velocitas		

International career
1926–1928	Netherlands	15	(2)
- * Club domestic league appearances and goals

Johan Gerard Hendrik "Jan" Elfring (8 February 1902 – 4 September 1977) was a Dutch footballer who participated at the 1928 Summer Olympics.

== Career ==
He played club football for local sides Go Ahead 1918 and Alcmaria Victrix as well as for Robur et Velocitas in Apeldoorn after he moved to that city in 1929.

Elfring made his debut for the Netherlands in an October 1926 friendly match against Germany and earned a total of 15 caps, scoring 2 goals. His final international was a December 1928 friendly against Italy.

== Personal life ==
His son Hans had one season in the Eerste Divisie, with AGOVV in 1957/58 and was a Robur et Velocitas member for over 80 years.
