= Alcmaria Victrix =

Dutch sport club

Coordinates: 52°37′44.66″N 4°42′54.47″E

- Full name: Verenigde Alkmaarse Voetbal Verenigingen Alcmaria Victrix
- Founded: 1 January 1898; 128 years ago
- Ground: Sportpark Egmonderhout, Alkmaar, Netherlands
- League: Derde Klasse Saturday (2023–24)
- Website: http://www.alcmariavictrix.nl/
Home colours

Alcmaria Victrix is a Dutch omnisport club based in Alkmaar. The club has football, baseball and softball departments. The name is derived from the city crest "Wapen van Alkmaar", Alcmaria Victrix as in Alkmaar as victor.

== History ==
One of the oldest football clubs in the country, the football club was founded 1 January 1898. In the early years of professional football in the Netherlands, Alcmaria Victrix were a competitive side, having played at the top flight of football in the Netherlands, as well as competing in the KNVB Cup. Currently the football team compete on an amateur level. No longer the top club in Alkmaar, the side was eventually surpassed by Alkmaar '54 who later merged to become AZ Alkmaar.

=== Notable players ===
The following player was called up to represent his national team in international football and received caps during his tenure with Alcmaria Victrix:

- (Netherlands) Jan Elfring (1925–1929)
