= Jan van Herwijnen =

Dutch painter (1889–1965)

Johannes Adrianus George van Herwijnen (4 November 1889 in Delft – 12 April 1965 in Bergen) was a Dutch painter.

== Life ==
Van Herwijnen was born in Delft and grew up in the Jordaan (Amsterdam).He was different from the rest of the family. At nine he went to the Rijksmuseum, a tiled table for copying, his master had given him a box of paints. Concerts and museums hold him up as he begins his eleventh year to earn a living.

He went to France with his family and lived from 1921 to 1923 in Collioure. The paintings of Collioure feature the clean lines of the drawings in which the paint is filled with much blue and purple. Then follows a gloomy period when his wife leaves him. Paintings reflect his depressive state and are very dark. When he goes to Florence, his work is lightened. "The conquest of light" in all newspapers and magazines celebrated with superlatives. "Van Herwijnen in the front ranks of contemporary painters came."

In the autumn of 1934, he moved a house in the new studio complex on the Summer Dijkstraat. Van Herwijnen married again and moved to Bergen in 1945.

In 1919 the artist signed a series of life-size portraits of people declared insane at the Utrecht William Arntz Foundation. Shortly after World War II, Van Herwijnen painted a series of portraits of the dead.

== Sources ==
- http://www.galeries.nl/mnkunstenaar.asp?artistnr=12670&vane=1&em=&meer=&sessionti=928662799
- http://www.trouw.nl/tr/nl/4512/Cultuur/archief/article/detail/1711238/2005/10/06/Portretten-van-angst-en-vervreemding.dhtml
- http://catalogue.nla.gov.au/Search/Home?lookfor=author:%22Herwijnen%2C%20Jan%20van%2C%201889-1965%22&iknowwhatimean=1
- http://www.elseviermaandschrift.nl/EGM/1931/01/19310101/EGM-19310101-0391/story.pdf
- http://elsevier.x-cago.com/EGM/1932/01/19320101/EGM-19320101-0007/story.pdf
- http://www.elseviermaandschrift.nl/EGM/1926/01/19260101/EGM-19260101-0269/story.pdf
