= Maria van Pallaes =

Dutch philanthropist

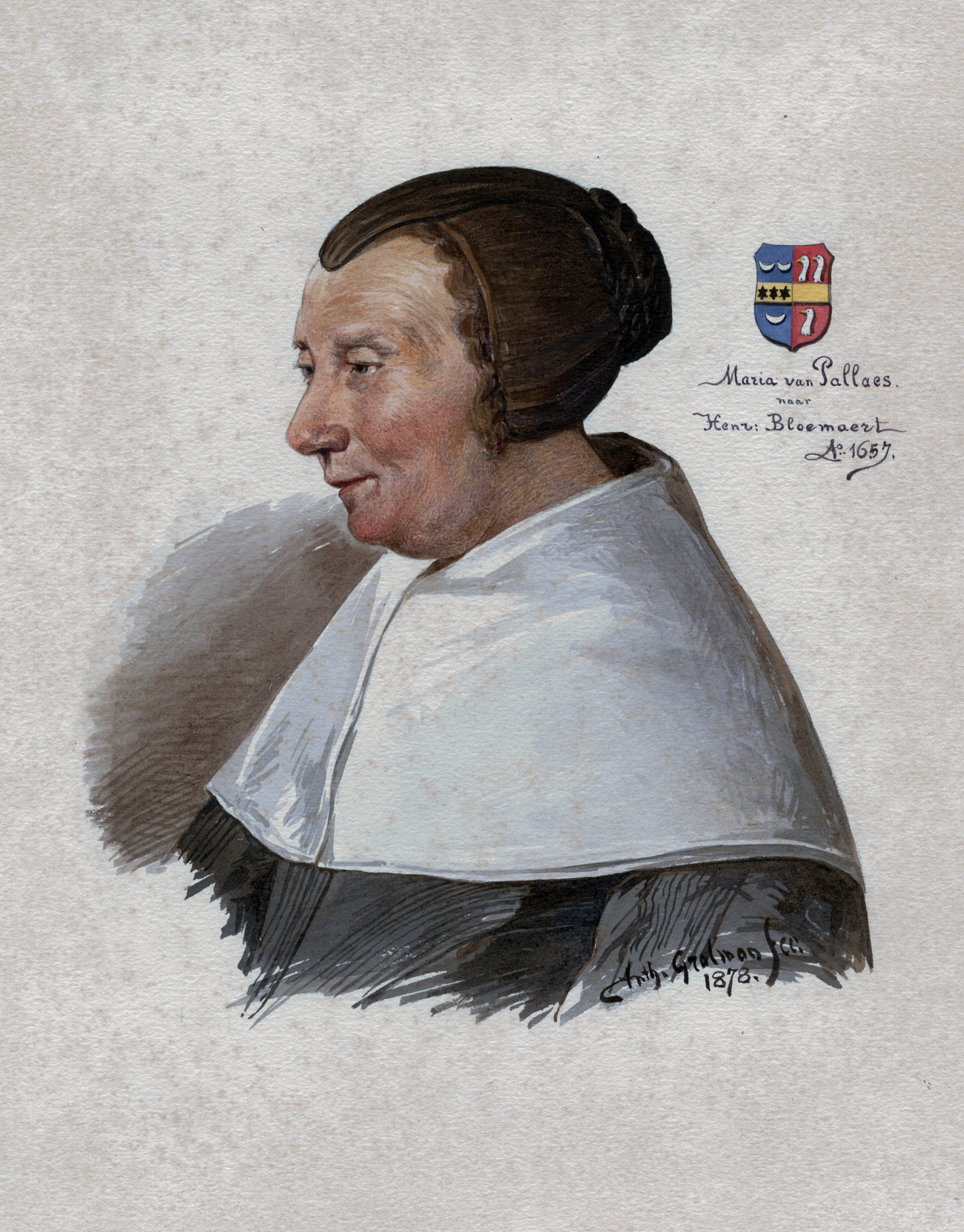
- 1878 painting of Van Pallaes, based on Hendrick Bloemaert's portrait
- Born: 1587; Utrecht, Dutch Republic
- Died: 23 October 1664 (aged 76–77); Utrecht, Dutch Republic
- Burial place: St. Martin's Cathedral, Utrecht; 52°05′27″N 5°07′18″E
- Known for: Philanthropy
- Spouse: Hendrick van Schroyesteijn (m. 1606; died 1630)
- Children: 6

Mayken Lubbert van Pallaesdr. (Note: Bert Aanstoot refers to her full name with a full stop at the end, while M. Cornelis does not include a full stop.) (1587 – 23 October 1664), commonly known as Maria van Pallaes, (Note: Dutch pronunciation: [maːˈrijaː vam ˈpɑlaːs].) was a Dutch philanthropist who established the Maria van Pallaes houses in the city of Utrecht. They consist of 12 almshouses and a refectory, together with a hofje or courtyard garden, to be used by the city's poor. After her death, the buildings were placed under the control of the Maria van Pallaes Foundation and another 28 almshouses were later built using her inheritance. The original 12 houses and refectory are now owned by the Utrecht Monument Foundation and are a Dutch national heritage site.

== Early life ==
Van Pallaes was born in 1587 in the Dutch city of Utrecht. She was the oldest child of Lubbert Jansz van Pallaes (died 1610) and Maria Johansdr van Reede (died 1649). She had two younger brothers: Lubbertus (died 1624) and Johan (died 1650). Both her parents came from patrician families and she was raised as a Roman Catholic.

On 11 January 1606, at the age of 19, Van Pallaes married Hendrick van Schroyesteijn, a lawyer at the court of Utrecht, in the presence of the city's aldermen. He was also a Roman Catholic. Van Pallaes had more possessions and capital than Van Schroyesteijn at the time of their marriage. They bought a house along the Oudegracht but later moved to 't Groot Huijs on Oudkerkhof where Van Pallaes lived for the rest of her life. The couple had six children: Johan, Lubbertus, Adriana, Margaretha, Livinius and Hendrick. In Van Pallaes and Van Schroyesteijn's will of 1624, their oldest son, Johan, was not mentioned as an heir; he was presumably disinherited but it is not known why. From 1624 Johan was not mentioned in any other documents or wills by Van Pallaes and Van Schroyesteijn. The youngest child, Hendrick, had not yet been born in 1624 and is therefore not mentioned in the will.

Van Pallaes and Van Schroyesteijn remained Roman Catholics for the rest of their lives. As a result of the Dutch Reformation, practising their Catholic faith had been prohibited in Utrecht since 1580. Nevertheless, they continued their devotions, making use of clandestine churches; Van Pallaes' mother similarly practised Catholicism in Utrecht after the Reformation, despite having been raised as a Calvinist. Two of Van Pallaes' children had Catholic religious vocations: Hendrick became a priest and Adriana became a Carmelite in Antwerp.

== Later life ==
Van Pallaes lost most of her loved ones in her later life. First, her son Livinius died when about 10 in 1624. Six years later, her husband, Van Schroyesteijn, died in 1630. She also lost four other children: Margaretha, the only child to be married, died in 1645; Lubbertus in 1646, Hendrick before 1649, and Johan, the oldest child, in c. 1649. As all Van Pallaes' children remained childless, there were no grandchildren.

Van Pallaes owned various houses in Utrecht as well as estates and residences in the surroundings. In 1649, she sent a request to the government of Utrecht, asking for permission to freely decide over her inheritance. Her only remaining child, Adriana, was a member of a mendicant order and, as such, was not able to inherit. If Van Pallaes had not filed a request, her family fortune would have gone to the community of Utrecht. She decided to use her funds as charity for the city's needy inhabitants. It is likely that she did not just do so because she cared for the poor but because she believed she would be rewarded with a place in heaven after her death.

=== Foundation of the first almshouses ===
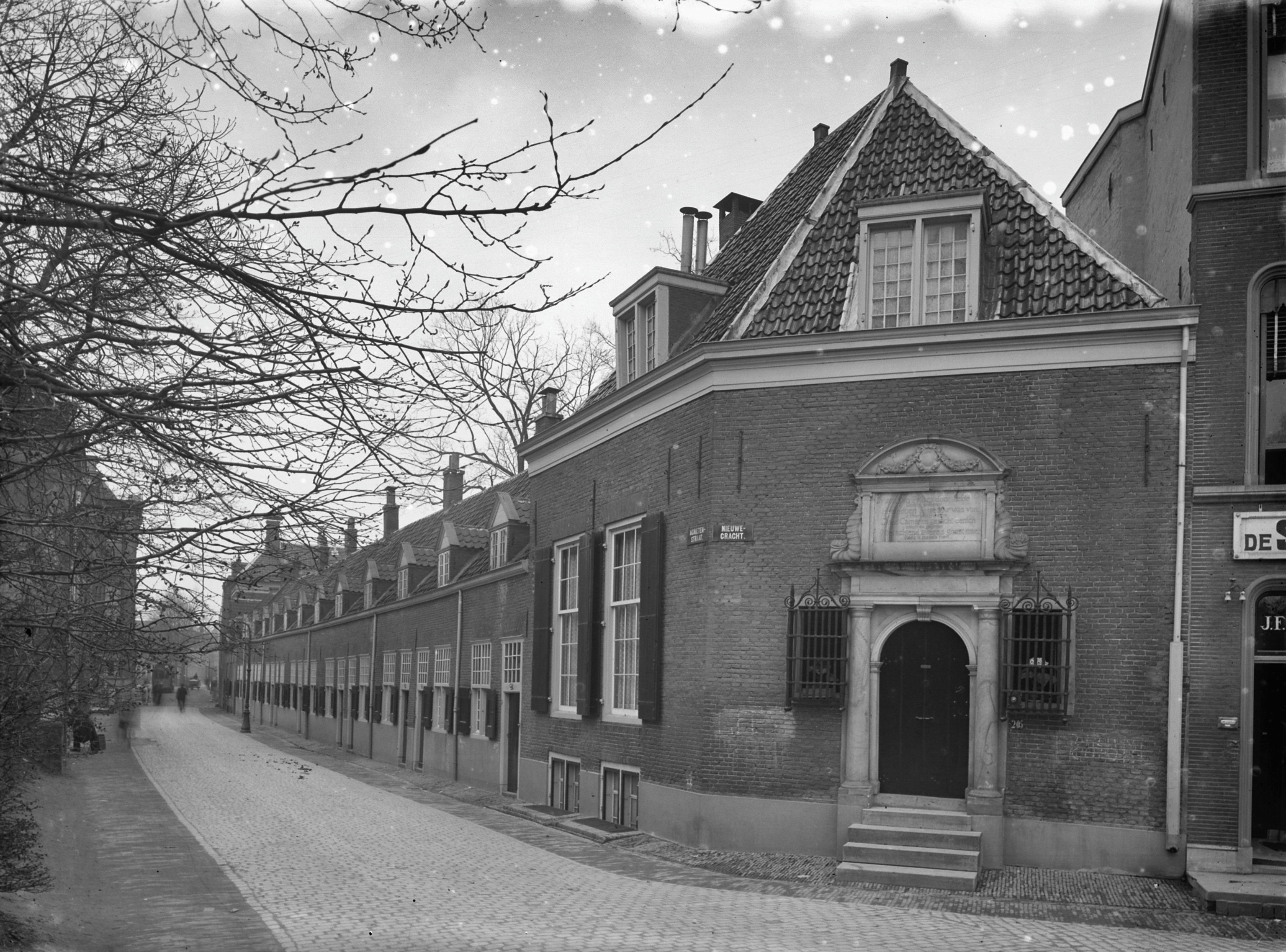
The 12 almshouses founded by Van Pallaes. The corner house is the refectory.

In 1651, Van Pallaes bought land from Utrecht's Agnietenmonastery to establish a hofje or collection of buildings with an adjoining court on the street now known as the Agnietenstraat. She charged a general contractor (whose identity is not known) to build 12 almshouses and a refectory there. Each house was designed to have two floors, with two rooms on each floor, except for one of them, which had a different layout. The houses were 4.5 by 7 metres (15 ft × 23 ft), with a community garden to the rear. This garden had a few toilets attached to its walls in groups of two or three and connected to a cesspit.

The corner house served as a refectory and meeting place for the administrators of the foundation (who were appointed to that position by Van Pallaes in her will). Residents could only eat in the refectory if, for some reason, they were unable to eat in their own homes. Sometimes they were invited to the refectory to meet the administrators. The refectory was rebuilt as an additional building in 1667, three years after Van Pallaes' death. As of 2019, the building still maintains the original locks.

All residents of the houses were subject to various conditions. First of all, those receiving support from the diaconate or similar sources were not eligible for residence. Second, residents were housed either with their spouse or with another individual of the same sex. If a spouse died, they were not allowed to remarry and were forced to leave. Third, residents who committed physical violence or had an "unsuitable" lifestyle were dismissed. Fourth, when residents died, their inheritance was transferred to the Maria van Pallaes Foundation, which paid for their funeral. Unusually for the times, Van Pallaes allowed both Catholics and Protestants to live in the houses.

Every year, the residents received wheat, butter and cheese, partly grown by Van Pallaes' tenant farmers, from the foundation. Van Pallaes was probably present herself on such occasions. After her death, the foundation's administrators handed out the food while sitting under a painting of Van Pallaes. In 1849, residents started receiving ƒ10, 70 kilograms (150 lb) of potatoes and 100 litres (22 imp gal) of coal every year instead of the wheat, butter and cheese. Towards the end of the 20th century, they stopped receiving money, as new social security programs rendered financial support unnecessary.

== Death ==
After a long period of sickness, Van Pallaes died on 23 October 1664. An extensive and costly funeral ceremony was held following her death. The bells of St. Martin's Cathedral were rung, as were those of St. Jan's Church, the Buurkerk and Saint Nicholas' Church. After the funeral, she was interred in her family grave at St. Martin's Cathedral. Ten years later, the grave was destroyed in a tornado.

=== Inheritance ===
After Van Palleas' death, her property was inherited by the Maria van Pallaes Foundation, which was headed by the two directors she had appointed. From that point on, incumbent directors would select their successors themselves. Over the course of the foundation's existence, an additional 28 almshouses were constructed using Van Pallaes' inheritance. The foundation continued to operate until 1910, when the municipal executive board of Utrecht started managing the houses. In 1978, the municipality bought the houses, transferring ownership of the original 12 almshouses and the refectory to the Utrecht Monument Foundation two years later.

== Legacy ==
The foundation's original almshouses and refectory were granted rijksmonument status in 1967 which, as of March 2020, they still hold.

In 2015, a corbel was revealed honouring Van Palles. The corbel shows two hands giving away apples and was designed and created by Cissy van der Wel.

=== Painting by Hendrick Bloemaert ===
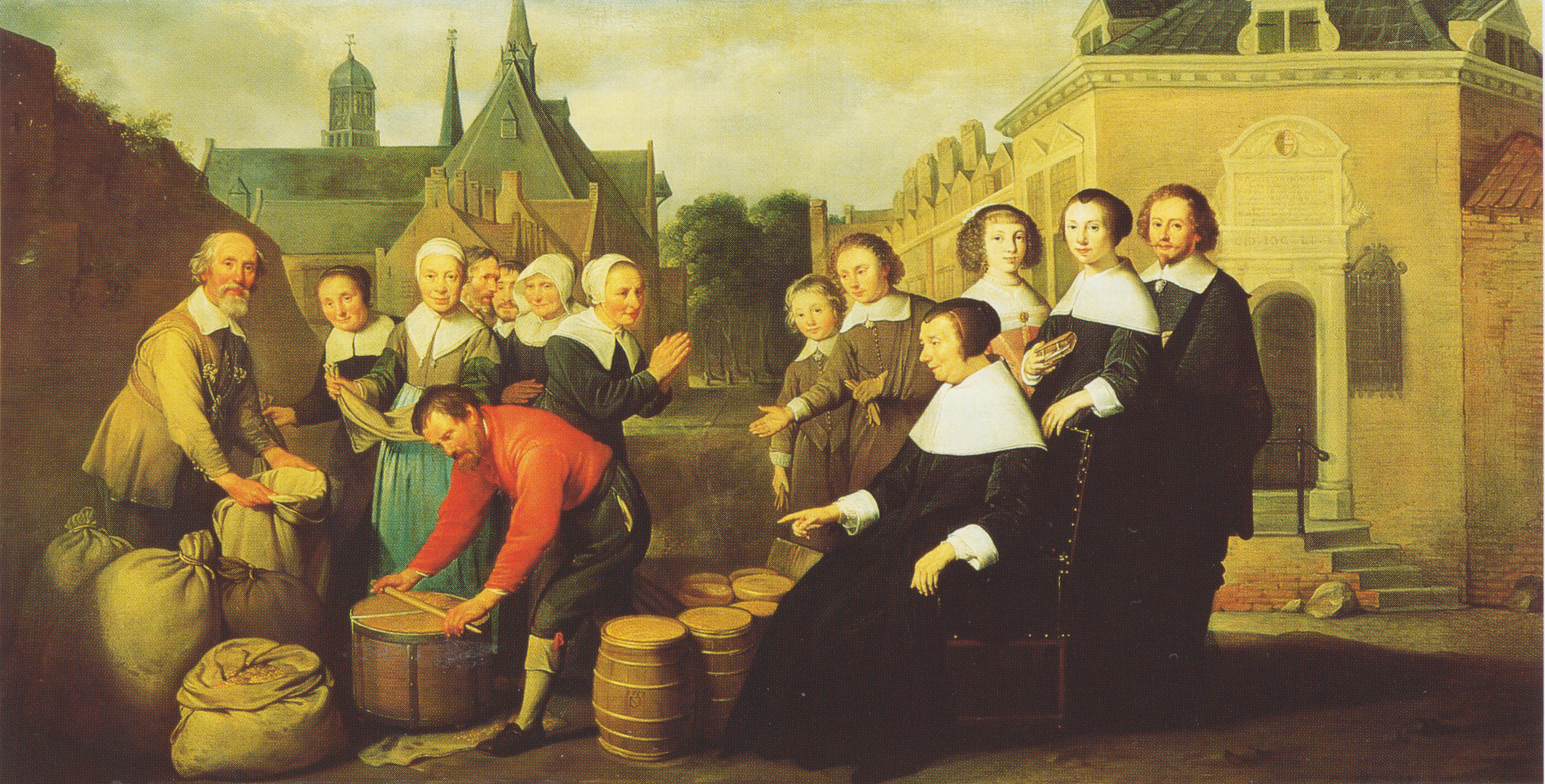
Yearly food distribution to the poor of Utrecht by Maria van Pallaes, a painting by Hendrick Bloemaert (1657). The woman sitting on the right is Van Pallaes, with her children in the background, and the houses in the background on the righthand side are the Maria van Pallaes houses.

Since 1924, the 1657 painting Yearly food distribution to the poor of Utrecht by Maria van Pallaes by Hendrick Bloemaert has belonged to the collection of the Centraal Museum and has been included in various exhibitions, most recently in Brazil's Pinacoteca do Estado de São Paulo.
