= Roel Buikema =

Dutch footballer

Personal information
- Date of birth: 22 March 1976 (age 50)
- Place of birth: Amsterdam, Netherlands
- Height: 1.86 m (6 ft 1 in)
- Position: Midfielder

Youth career
- Quick

Senior career*
Years	Team	Apps	(Gls)
1996–1999	MVV	33	(3)
1999–2001	Helmond Sport	64	(6)
2001–2005	Heracles	135	(24)
2005–2007	Excelsior	10	(1)
2005–2006	→ FC Den Bosch (loan)	20	(1)
2006–2007	→ VVV (loan)	32	(4)
Total		294	(39)
- * Club domestic league appearances and goals

Roel Buikema (born 22 March 1976 in Amsterdam) is a retired Dutch footballer who played as a midfielder for MVV, Helmond Sport, Heracles Almelo, Excelsior, FC Den Bosch and VVV-Venlo.

== Club career ==
Buikema played for amateur side Quick in The Hague during his youth years. During his first season in professional football, 1996–97, he won the Eerste Divisie with MVV. Subsequently, he made 14 appearances in the Eredivisie during the 1997–98 and 1998–99 seasons. Afterwards, he exclusively played in the Eerste Divisie, despite winning promotion to the Eredivisie three more times (with Heracles Almelo in 2004–05, with Excelsior in 2005–06 although he was loaned out to FC Den Bosch three months into the season, and as a loanee with VVV-Venlo in 2006–07 after playoffs).

After retiring as a player, Buikema was appointed head of the academy at childhood club Quick.

== Honours ==
MVV

- Eerste Divisie winner: 1996–97

Heracles Almelo

- Eerste Divisie winner: 2004–05

Excelsior

- Eerste Divisie winner: 2005–06
