= Mieke Groot =

Dutch glass artist

Maria Margaretha Cornelia Anna Groot (born 21 November 1949) is a Dutch glass artist. Her work is part of the collection of the Corning Museum of Glass, the National Glasmuseum in Leerdam, Netherlands and the Victoria and Albert Museum in London, England.

== Biography ==
Groot was born in Alkmaar and studied contemporary artistic jewelry art at Gerrit Rietveld Academie in Amsterdam. In 1976, she opened a studio in the city, General Glass. In the 1980s, she became director of the glass department at Rietveld Academie.

During the 2000s she began to produce glass jewellery.
