= Nicolaas Godfried van Kampen =

Dutch Mennonite author and deacon

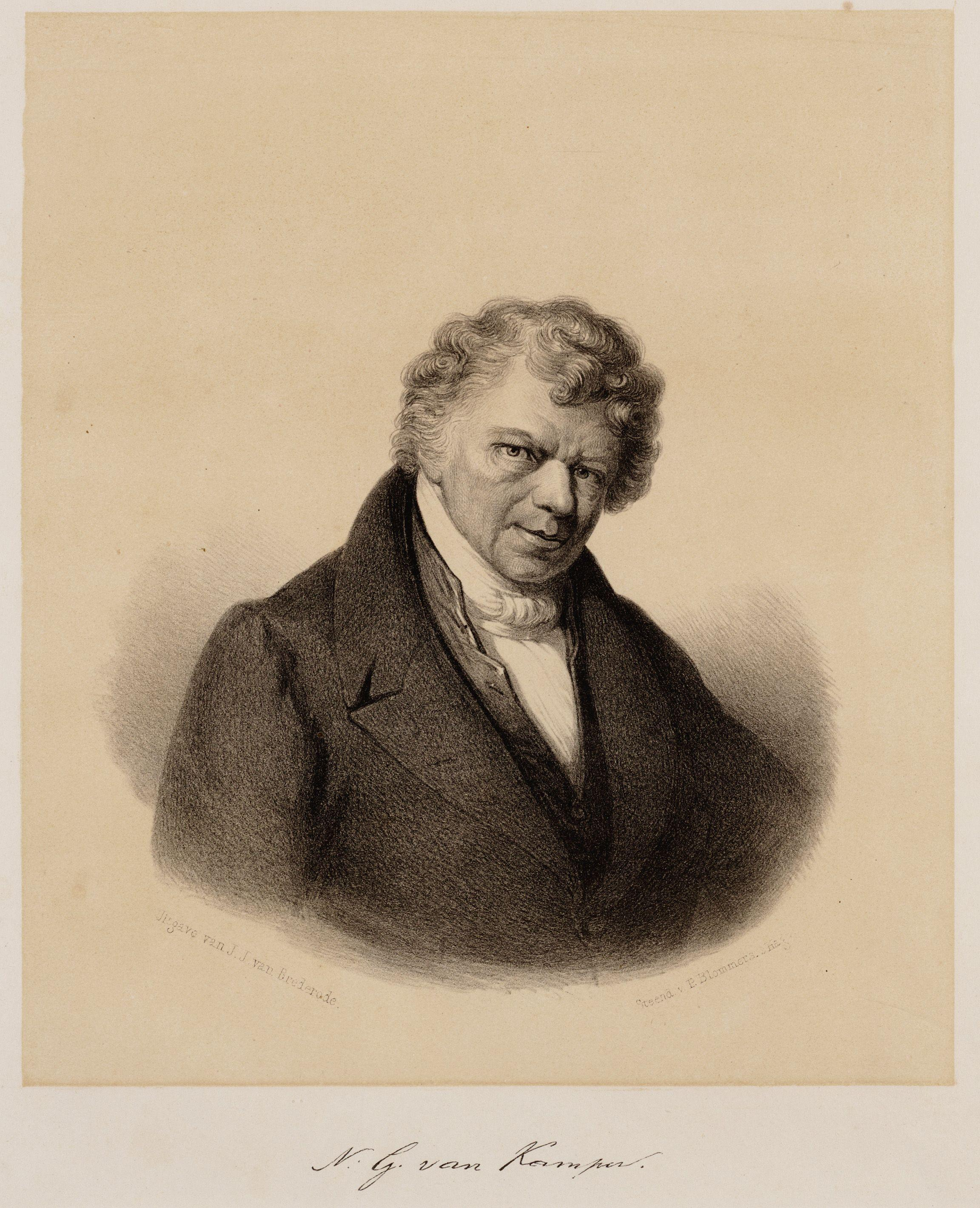
Portrait of Nicolaas Godfried van Kampen.

Nicolaas Godfried van Kampen (15 May 1776, Haarlem – 15 March 1839, Amsterdam) was a Dutch Mennonite author and deacon.

While never university educated, he studied literature and history and published a large number of writings, including a history of the French domination of Europe (1810-1823, eight volumes). In 1829 he was called to teach Dutch literature and history at the Athenaeum (university) of Amsterdam.

During his time in Leiden he was a deacon of the Mennonite congregation (1812-1815, 1818-1819, 1821-1829).

== Works ==
In the early 19th century, he published Beknopte Geschiedenis der Letteren en Wetenschappen in de Nederlanden, van de Vroegste Tijden af, tot op het Begin van de Negentiende Eeuw (Brief History of Literature and Sciences in the Netherlands, from the Earliest Times, unto the beginning of the Nineteenth Century).
