= Frederik Lauesen =

Danish TV presenter (born 1972)

Frederik Lauesen (born 10 November 1972) is a Danish TV presenter, who has been head of sport for the Danish channel TV 2 since September 2008.

== Career ==
He is well known in Denmark and France for presenting the sports news, including presenting of the Danish coverage of the Tour de France. He worked on TV 2 Sport from 1998, presenting the magazine show LPS, before becoming editorial director of the news department for a year. He was criticised by a women's handball team, FC Midtjylland, in December 2009 after he called the women's game unexciting.

Lauesen decided not to screen the football European Championships in summer 2024 at bars and cafes, for business reasons.

== Personal life ==
He grew up in Kolding. He lives in Odense with his two children. He met his Greenland-born wife Laila Sylvester Grossmann in 2000, and they married in 2006. She died in November 2007 aged 39 from a heart attack. Lauesen and his family received over one million krone in compensation for her death after making a complaint about the three doctors who treated her.
