= Willy Wielek-Berg =

Dutch translator, writer, film critic

- Born: Willy Berg; 14 June 1919; Steenwijk, the Netherlands
- Died: 7 January 2004 (aged 84); Amsterdam, the Netherlands
- Occupations: Translator, critic, writer
- Spouse: Wilhelm Kweksilber

Willy Wielek-Berg (June 14, 1919 – January 7, 2004) was a Dutch translator, film critic, writer, columnist and resistance fighter. She translated the work of dozens of writers, including Joseph Roth, Heinrich Böll, Theodor Fontane, Grete Weil, JRR Tolkien, Muriel Spark, Nina Simone and Russell Banks.

== Life and work ==
Wielek-Berg was born as Willy Berg in Steenwijk, the Netherlands, on 14 June 1919 to a traveling salesman Wilhelmus Johannes Berg and shopkeeper Jantje Klijzing. She attended the Hogereburgerschool in Zwolle and after finishing her education she was apprenticed to the regional daily newspaper Zwolsche Courant.

=== War years ===
Wielek-Berg settled in Amsterdam in 1943. During World War II, she was influenced by a cousin to join a local communist-oriented resistance group called CS-6 (for Corellistraat 6) that was making bombs to sabotage the trains of the Nazi occupying forces. Wielek-Berg worked as a courier but with the other members of the group, she was arrested and sentenced to six months in prison in the House of Detention II on Amstelveenseweg. The Nazis murdered the rest of her group in prison but by feigning hysteria, Wielek-Berg managed to escape their fate and survived.

After the war, Wielek-Berg joined the Communist Party of the Netherlands and briefly wrote about art for De Waarheid (The Truth). But she was dismissed on the basis that her communist convictions were considered "not strong enough," as demonstrated by her decision to review the film The Third Man (1949). According to Amelink, "She shouldn't have written about a film that was ugly about the Russians."

=== Career and Marriage ===
In 1947, Wielek-Berg began to write extensively about The Holocaust. In 1952, she married a man by the name of Henk Wielek; which was actually the pseudonym of the Jewish Polish-German writer, film critic and Member of Parliament of the Dutch Labor Party (1973-1978) Wilhelm Kweksilber. She took on his alias as part of her married name becoming Willy Wielek-Berg.

From the 1960s, Wielek-Berg began to focus on translating books and radio plays, and from 1970 she started reviewing films and books for the newspaper Trouw. In doing so, she had to limit her reviews to films considered in good taste and avoid immoral or blasphemous books or movies. At the time, Wielek-Berg did not dare publish a review of Monty Python's Life of Brian because of its blasphemous nature, even though she said in an interview that she "thought that was wonderful."

=== Writings and death ===
In 1992, Wielek-Berg made her creative writing debut with the novel De Lichten, which was followed in 1995 by her collection of short stories titled after her cat Zwarte de Pik van Botha. When her husband, Kweksilber, began a slow decline due to Alzheimer's disease, Wielek-Berg cared for him until his death in 1988, unwilling to have him admitted to a care home and running the risk that he would become frightened thinking that he was living in a concentration camp.

Wielek-Berg continued writing "until the end. She devoured detective novels by the hundreds." She died in Amsterdam at 84 on 7 January 2004 after a short illness.

== Selected works ==
- 1960: Commander of Auschwitz; self-portrait of an executioner (translation of an autobiography of Rudolf Höss )
- 1964: Death in Rome (translation of Der Tod in Rom by Wolfgang Koeppen )
- 1968: The Blacksmith of Great Wolding (translation from Smith of Wootton Major, by J. R. R. Tolkien)
- 1971: Tolkien's Fairy Tales 1 (translations)
- 1976: The Infant of Death Radio Play
- 1977: Tolkien's Fairy Tales 2 (translations)
- 1981: Radetzkymars (translation of the novel by Joseph Roth)
- 1992: The Lights (novel)
- 1995: Zwarte de Pik van Botha (Botha's Black Cock) (short story collection named after her cat)
