= Aaron Hakohen Perahyah =

17th-century Greek rabbi and writer

Aaron ben Hayyim Abraham Hakohen Perahyah (Hebrew: אהרן בן חיים אברהם הכהן פרחיה) was a rabbi and author who lived at Salonica in the seventeenth century. He was a pupil of Ḥasdai Peraḥyah ha-Kohen.

== Works ==
Perahyah was the author of the following four works: (1) "Paraḥ Maṭṭeh Aharon" (Amsterdam, 1703), responsa written between the years 1647 and 1695. (2) "Pirḥe Kehunnah" (ib. 1709), novellæ on certain Talmudic treatises. Both works were edited by his son Azriel, who wrote the introductions. The Amsterdam rabbis, among whom was Solomon Ayllon (compare Heinrich Graetz, "Geschichte der Juden" x., note 6), gave their approbation to these works. (3) "Zikron Debarim" (Salonica, 1747), a collection of laws and shorter responsa, with an introduction by Samuel Florentin the Younger. (4) "Bigde Kehunnah" (ib. 1753), homilies and funeral orations. The last two works were carried through the press by Samuel Mishan, a grandson of the author, in collaboration with Elijah Ḥakim (Leopold Zunz, "Gottesdienstliche Vorträge" ii. 445; Graetz, l.c.).
