= Willem Doorn =

Dutch vicar (1836 - 1908)

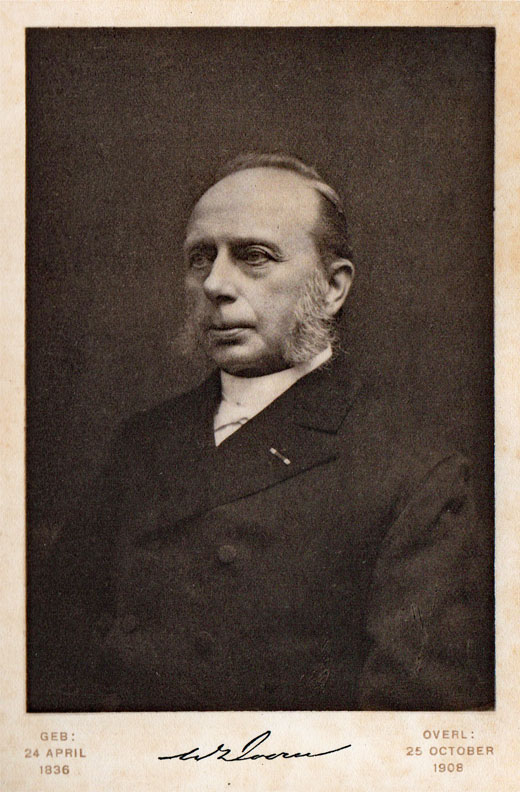
Portrait of Rev. Willem Doorn

Rev. Willem Doorn (April 24, 1836 – October 25, 1908) was a Dutch vicar.

Rev. Doorn was known by his role as vicar of the Dutch Reformed Church at the Nobel Street in The Hague, where he served for 33 years and excelled in exegesis and homiletics, by his role as chairman of the board of the Theological University of Kampen and by his role in the General Synode of The Netherlands.

He was born in Zwolle, in 1836, as son of Petrus Doorn and Lienna Jacoba Krans, descendant of Hendrik Doorn (Doren) born 1720, and probably a descendant of Jan (Jansen) Doorn (Doren) born 1640, living on the estate Den Doren in Haerst, The Netherlands. (Remember Our Vicars, Volume 2 1836, Volume 4 1871).

== Early life ==
Rev. Doorn was raised in Zwolle, The Netherlands, as oldest one in a family with four children and two working parents. Already at a young age he had the desire to become a vicar. This wish was tried for quite a while, because initially the way wasn't paved. Eventually, he was given the opportunity to move from Zwolle to Kampen and to enroll at the Theological University of Kampen. His years of study went very well. In 1865, at the age of 29, he became Candidate in Theology. On October 25 of the same year, he was ordained as vicar in Deventer, by his tutor Prof. H. De Cock. (Handbook for Reformed Churches, 1909, pages 337–342)

== Ministry ==
Already since 1865, in his first congregation in Deventer, The Netherlands, the work of Rev. Doorn has been very blessed. During his church services, a lot of people repented or got converted. From the many aspects of the ministry, he preferred working under the youth, and visiting the ill to bring them the comfort of the gospel. A year after his ordination, when cholera was raging in The Netherlands, he wasn't sparing himself and brought words of exhortation and comfort wherever he was called to go, even outside the circles of his own congregation.

In 1873, he left as vicar from Deventer to a congregation in Heerenveen. Financially, there were better options for him at that time, but the Dutch province Friesland where Heerenveen was situated, attracted him. Still, he worked there shortly. With a view to the upbringing of his children, in 1875, he accepted the position as vicar at the Nobel Street Church in The Hague, The Netherlands.

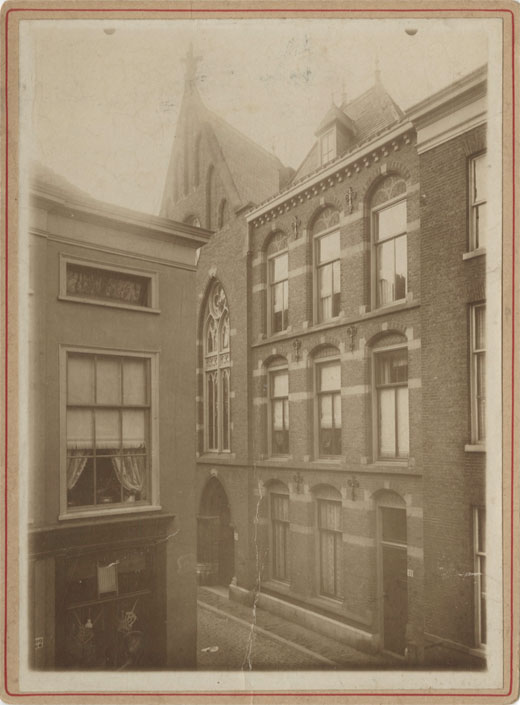
Nobel Street Church in 1875

The congregation at the Nobel Street Church was halved after a church split in 1857. When Rev. Doorn took up office in 1875, the church had just grown back to 523 members, which was the amount in 1857. With Rev. Doorn, “being averse to cold intellectualism and unhealthy mysticism” as an observer noticed, the Nobel Street Church got a unifying and vibrant vicar. During his years in office, the congregation increased to 1300 members. Rev. Doorn stayed vicar here for 33 years until his death.

During his sermons, Rev. Doorn excelled in exegesis. His text partitioning testified of homiletic skills and marked him as a student of Prof. v. Velzen. He shunned flowery language and phantasies and was known for his solid outlines, clarity and anointing. At special occasions, he could preach with power and great flow. Where he was pleading, his style was more warmth and with passion. His sermons especially spread comfort among the brethren. He could encourage the anxious soul and bring it into Gods hand, as a mean to rejoice the Christian faith. In his ministry, there was a peculiar mixture of gentleness and strength. Sin and mercy were never missing. (Churches Attended by People of The Hague, 1983)

== Other activities ==
A salient character trait of Rev. Doorn was his active nature. He worked seven days a week, from early morning till late in the evening. For years, he led confirmation classes after the morning service, and after the evening service, he led meetings for the youth. Taking vacation was foreign to him. He participated in many committees, was chairman of the board of the Theological School (now: Theological University of Kampen), board member of the Orphanage of Middelharnis, and representative in the General Synode of The Netherlands. Also, continues study stood high on his personal agenda. For decades, he devoted his Saturday to scripture study, till deep in the night. Only in later years, he allowed himself to go to bed as early as at midnight.

Rev. Doorn was also known by his stable and dependable character. At his grave, people testified that loyalty was one of his most prominent traits. One could count on him, entrust him the biggest secrets. He could have been rightfully called “Willem de Zwijger” (translated: William the Silent”). This trait caused him to have the trust of many people in the congregation. “When I die, I’ll take many secrets to the grave”, was a sentence he mentioned occasionally. Besides, there was decisiveness in his comings and goings, and consistency in his way, which did not deter him from conciliating as well.

Though loyal to the church, churchism was foreign to Rev. Doorn. As during his 25th jubilee of holding the office, Rev. Hoogstraten was attending his service, and it was just typical to Rev. Doorn to address some kind words during the sermon to this fellow minister from a different reformed denomination. Again, in his sermon during his 40th jubilee of holding the office, he directed some words to brethren from this different reformed denomination, though with the same confession of faith. As he said: "We don’t differ in the essence of our message. Only in the contemplations of some side issues, we think differently." It was therefore rather painful for his heart, seeing a lot of people not joining the Unity of the Reformed Churches in 1892, and establishing a separate unity called the Christian Reformed Church.

== Marriage ==
At October 5, 1865, twenty days before taking up office in Deventer, Rev. Doorn married Gesina Bosch, born in Zwolle at March 2, 1839, daughter of Albertus Bosch and Elsje Poortier. The Handbook for the Reformed Churches, edition 1909, testifies that Rev. Doorn and Gesina Bosch were intimately connected, and that Gesina knew how to tactfully cheer up her husband in discouraging moments. Also, in a book in a word of thanks, in 1890, their children testify of a marriage that has been blessed and strengthened by God. When Gesina died, in The Hague on July 14, 1892, they were married for 27 years.

Rev. Doorn and Gesina Bosch got 7 children:

1. Petrus, born in Deventer 07–28-1866, drawing teacher in 1896 living in Alkmaar, and from 1905 till 1910 living in Haarlem, CEO of the Royal Academy of Art in The Hague from 1915 till 1928, died in Zeist 27-02-1941, married in The Hague 07–24-1896 Maria Wilhelmina van Baalen, born in Weesp 05-29-1872, died in Zeist 11-03-1947.
2. Elize Dirkje, born in Deventer 09-02-1868, living in Zeist in 1908, died in Veenendaal (buried in The Hague) 06-13-1923.
3. Albertus, born in Deventer 02-10-1871, ordained as vicar in Axel 11-25-1894, vicar in Franeker from 1897 till 1908, vicar in Apeldoorn from 1908 till 1923, vicar in Heerde from 1923 till 1933, died in Apeldoorn 01-30-1950, married 11-15-1894 Hermina Johanna Willemine van Teijlingen, born in Hillegom 01-25-1873, died in Apeldoorn 03-09-1946.
4. Willem, born in Heerenveen 07-10-1873, watch maker with own store and workshop at Noordeinde 115A in The Hague and later at Piet Heinstraat 61, died in The Hague 05–18-1939, married in Rotterdam 03-28-1907 Elisabeth Johanna Hagenbeek, born in Deventer 01-01-1877, died in Breda (buried in The Hague) 03-28-1965, daughter of Jan Jacob Hagenbeek (paper maker / miller) and Geertruida Straalman.
5. Lina Jacoba, born in The Hague 02-17-1876, living in The Hague in 1908, died in The Hague 03-17-1943.
6. Frederik, born in The Hague 09-24-1879, died in The Hague 02-18-1880 (4 months old).
7. Frederik (Frits), living in Amsterdam in 1908.

== Honours ==
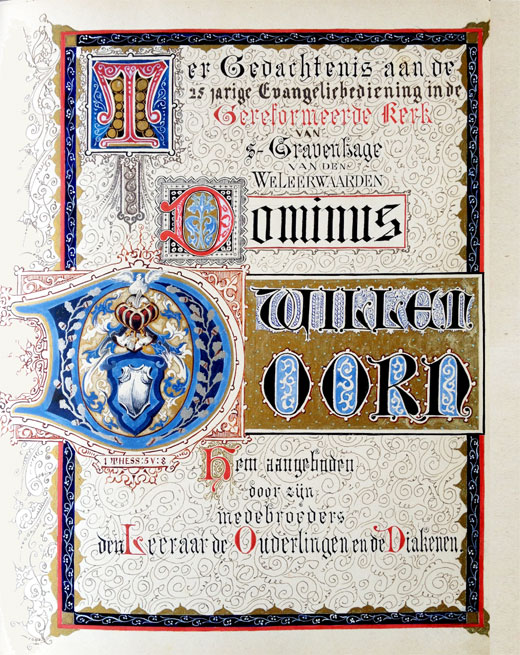
Coat of arms of the Doorn family

In 1900, in a book presented to Rev. Doorn by his fellow members in office, on the occasion of his 25th jubilee as vicar in the Nobel Street Church, a coat of arms was found, designed and drawn by his son Petrus Doorn, drawing teacher in 1896 and CEO of the Royal Academy of Art in The Hague from 1915 till 1928. In 2013, the coat of arms is stylized and registered at the Dutch Association of Genealogy (see external links).

The motto on the scroll refers to the Bible: 1 Thessalonians 5 verse 8 (KJV): “But let us, who are of the day, be sober, putting on the breastplate of faith and love; and for an helmet, the hope of salvation.”

In 1902, August 28, Rev. Doorn was appointed a Knight in the Order of Oranje Nassau by Queen Wilhelmina of The Netherlands.

Reason for distinction as recorded: “Walks his path in quiet simplicity. Completely committed to his important work, and loyal in looking after the interests of his blessed congregants, he is deeply loved, while also acknowledged outside his denomination. He is the oldest vicar holding the office in the Dutch Reformed Church”. (Registry of The Order of Oranje Nassau, The Hague, volume 31 Aug 1898 - 31 dec 1908)

== Death ==
Though more slender built than having a strong and broad body, Rev. Doorn has worked non-stop until his last breath. On October 25, 1908, after 43 years in office, whereof 33 years in the Nobel Street Church, he suddenly died at the age of 72 in The Hague.

“As always, he had prepared for the sermon and laid out the things to take with him to the Eastern Church where he would preach that morning. However, the night before, he got a light fever which made him decide in the morning to stay in bed. Just before the service, he requested Rev. v.d. linden to come, to talk about the announcements in church that morning. Right after, he got a disruption in his breathing. While Rev. v.d. Linden went to the consistorial room to call in a doctor, Rev. Doorn died in the arms of his youngest daughter, who was the only one at home at the moment. Rev. Doorn is buried on the last Thursday of October 1908, on the cemetery Oud-Eik-en-Duinen, where thousands were gathered that day, showing that he lived in many hearts.” (Handbook for Reformed Churches, 1909, pages 337–342)

== Bibliography ==
- (Dutch) De verlossing van Paulus en Silas uit de boeien: lerende over Hand. 16:25-34 (1870)
- (Dutch) De vergiffenis der zonden aan het afgekeerde Israel door den Here beloofd: leerrede ter voorbereiding voor het Avondmaal over Jezaja 1:16-18 (1871)
- (Dutch) Het lied der engelen in de velden van Betlehem: kerstpreek over Lucas 2:13-14 (1872)
- (Dutch) Paulus’ dankerkentenis voor des Heeren ondersteuning in de bediening des Evangelies: gedachtenisrede na volbrachte vijf-en-twintigjarige evangeliebediening (1890)
- (Dutch) Paulus’ roem in de hulpe des Heeren tot vervulling zijner bediening: gedachtenisrede na volbrachte veertigjarige ambtsbediening op October 1905 (1905)
- (Dutch) Overdenkingen: sprekende nadat hij is gestorven, bundel met selectie van 32 schriftbeschouwingen van Ds. Doorn (1909)
- (Dutch) Herinneringswoord aan jeugdige leden der gemeente bij het afleggen hunner geloofsbelijdenis (1917)

== Sources ==
- CBG: Gedenkt uw voorgangers; dl. 2, published by the Dutch Central Bureau of Genealogy, section Rev. W. Doorn, 1836 (Library: CBG)
- CBG: Gedenkt uw voorgangers; dl. 4, published by the Dutch Central Bureau of Genealogy, section Rev. W. Doorn, 1871 (Library: CBG)
- Handboek ten dienste van de geref. kerken in Nederland, incl. biography of Rev. W. Doorn, published in Goes, volume 1909, pages 337-342 (Library: Theological University of Kampen)
- Waar Hagenaars kerkten, Den Haag, Ch. Dumas, 1983
- Herdenkingsboek ter gelegenheid van het zilveren huwelijk tussen Ds. W. Doorn en Gesina Bosch, 1890.
- Herdenkingsboek ter gelegenheid van 25 jarig ambtsjubileum van Ds. W. Doorn bij de gereformeerde kerk te Den Haag, 1900.
- Orde van Oranje Nassau: van af 31 aug 1898 tot 31 dec 1908 (library: Dutch National Archives)
