= Daniël de Ridder =

Dutch footballer (born 1984)

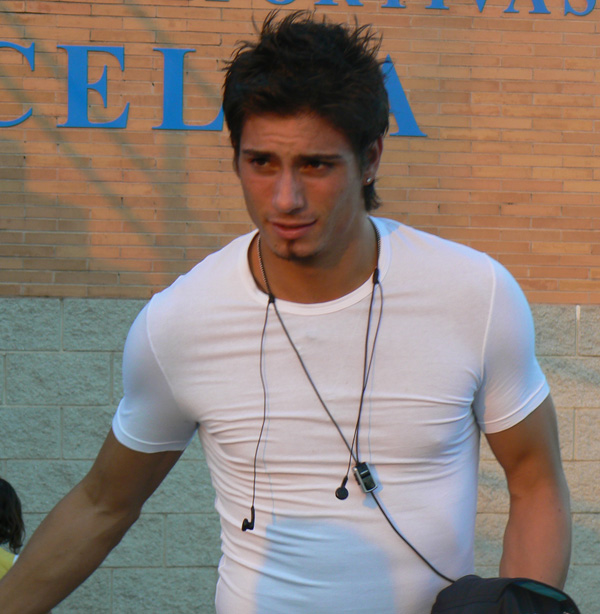
- De Ridder leaving the Celta Vigo training ground in 2006

Personal information
- Full name: Daniël Robin Frederick de Ridder
- Date of birth: 6 March 1984 (age 42)
- Place of birth: Amsterdam, Netherlands
- Height: 1.80 m (5 ft 11 in)
- Position: Winger

Youth career
- Ajax

Senior career*
Years	Team	Apps	(Gls)
2004–2005	Ajax	30	(3)
2005–2007	Celta Vigo	20	(1)
2007–2008	Birmingham City	10	(0)
2008–2011	Wigan Athletic	18	(0)
2010	→ Hapoel Tel Aviv (loan)	11	(2)
2011–2012	Grasshoppers	22	(3)
2012–2013	Heerenveen	13	(4)
2014	RKC Waalwijk	10	(2)
2014–2015	Cambuur	21	(2)
Total		155	(17)

International career
2004–2007	Netherlands U21	30	(1)
Medal record
Men's football
Representing Netherlands
UEFA European Under-21 Championship
Winner	2006 Portugal
Winner	2007 Netherlands
- * Club domestic league appearances and goals

Daniël Robin Frederick de Ridder (born 6 March 1984) is a Dutch former professional footballer. He played as a winger operating either on the right or left side but would occasionally play a more advanced role. He represented Ajax, Celta Vigo, Birmingham City, Wigan Athletic, Hapoel Tel Aviv, Grasshoppers, Heerenveen, RKC Waalwijk and Cambuur.

Since 2016, De Ridder has worked as a pundit for football program NOS Eredivisie op Vrijdag.

== Early and personal life ==
De Ridder was born in Amsterdam to a Dutch father and a Jewish-Israeli mother. He is Jewish and speaks Hebrew. De Ridder is one of seven Jewish players to have played for Ajax – the others being Eddy Hamel, Johnny Roeg, Bennie Muller, Sjaak Swart, Ilan Boccara, and Oscar Gloukh.

== Club career ==
=== Ajax ===
De Ridder worked his way up to first-team selection from Ajax's youth department, making his full debut in an away game against Roda JC on 21 January 2004, and scored his first goal against Willem II on 16 May.

De Ridder was a regular throughout the second half of the campaign, starting nine games and appearing a further six times as a substitute. He made his UEFA Champions League debut in September 2004, coming on as a 69th-minute substitute in a 4–0 defeat at Bayern Munich. In December 2004, he was offered an improved contract until June 2007.

Part of the Netherlands side that reached the second qualifying round of the UEFA European Under-19 Championship in 2002–03, De Ridder stepped up to the U21s as the 2006 UEFA European Championship qualifying campaign kicked off.

De Ridder was told prior to the 2005–06 season that there would be no room for him in the squad and he could expect little playing time if he decided to stay.

=== Celta Vigo ===
De Ridder joined Celta de Vigo permanently on 31 August 2005.

On 25 September 2005, De Ridder made his official debut for Celta when they beat Sevilla, allowing the Galician club to temporarily top La Liga. On 3 April 2006, he scored his first official goal for Celta against Atlético Madrid. Throughout the second half of the campaign he was a regular for Celta, but they were relegated to the Segunda División at the end of the 2006–07 season.

=== Birmingham City ===
De Ridder signed for Birmingham City on a free transfer on 3 July 2007. He made his Premier League debut on 12 August 2007 as a substitute in the opening match of the season against Chelsea, but injured his ankle within minutes of coming on and was unable to complete the match. Though starting the League Cup defeat at Blackburn Rovers, he was not considered fit enough for League games until after the October international break, when he made a substitute appearance against Manchester City. He was a key player in Birmingham's 3–2 win against Wigan Athletic on 27 October 2007 in which he made his full home debut. De Ridder's last game for the club was in January 2008 in the FA Cup, manager Alex McLeish considering him better suited to a style of play which placed more emphasis on passing than did Birmingham's. His contract was cancelled by mutual consent at the end of the season.

=== Wigan Athletic ===
De Ridder joined Wigan Athletic the next day on a free transfer and signed a three-year deal. He got his first assist against Newcastle United coming off the bench and swinging in an 89th-minute corner for a dramatic Titus Bramble equalizer. He was released by Wigan at the end of the 2010–11 season.

==== Loan to Hapoel Tel Aviv ====
De Ridder moved to Israel and signed for Hapoel Tel Aviv on loan until the end of the season on 20 January 2010 after failing to make an appearance for Wigan Athletic in the 2009–10 season. Hapoel Tel Aviv were surprised to learn that De Ridder did not have an Israeli passport since the age of 3 and would have to register him as a foreigner. The club then approached the Interior Ministry to check what allowances could be made to register De Ridder as an Israeli since he is Jewish. During his time with Hapoel, De Ridder scored a crucial goal against Bnei Yehuda Tel Aviv F.C. in the 46th minute (which won the game for Hapoel). He also scored the third goal against F.C. Ashdod, a game which Hapoel won 4–0. He won the Israeli Cup and the Israeli Championship with Hapoel Tel Aviv in 2010.

=== Grasshopper Club Zürich ===
On 9 July 2011, De Ridder signed a two-year contract with Grasshopper Club Zürich. Through his first 11 games for the club, he assisted two Swiss Super League goals.

== International career ==
Ever-present in the qualification games of the Netherlands U-21 team along with Klaas-Jan Huntelaar, De Ridder entered the finals as the most experienced member of the Netherlands' U-21 squad with 18 caps. He scored the decisive goal in the match against Italy which ensured qualification for the semifinals. The Netherlands went on to win the UEFA U-21 Championship 2006.

In 2007 De Ridder was called up by Jong Oranje coach Foppe de Haan to be part of his squad for the 2007 UEFA European Under-21 Football Championship held in the Netherlands. He participated in their first round group match against Israel (1–0 win) and after the match against Portugal (2–1 win) they secured a semifinal spot and qualification for the 2008 Summer Olympics. In the semifinals against England (1–1, 13–12 after 32 penalty kicks) De Ridder scored and missed one of the penalty kicks. In the final against Serbia (4–1), De Ridder provided the pass from which Otman Bakkal made it 1–0. In the second half he created the opportunity for Ryan Babel to put the Netherlands 2–0 up, and in the 87th minute Luigi Bruins scored a tap-in from a De Ridder move to make it 4–1. The Netherlands won the UEFA U-21 Championship 2007.

== Post-playing career ==
After retiring from football in 2015, De Ridder worked as a sports analyst for NOS and ESPN. He also holds a university law degree. In January 2024, he returned to AFC Ajax for a specialized management traineeship designed for former players.

In April 2026, De Ridder was appointed as a technical manager at Ajax, assisting technical director Jordi Cruijff. His role focuses on integrating technical football decisions with legal and business structures. His duties include managing players on loan, preparing player transfers, and helping establish the club's top sports department.

== Honours ==
Ajax

- Eredivisie: 2003–04
- Dutch Super Cup: 2005

Hapoel Tel Aviv

- Israeli Premier League: 2009–10
- Israel State Cup: 2010

Netherlands U21

- UEFA European Under-21 Championship: 2006, 2007

Individual

- Talent of the Year (NOS Award): 2004

== See also ==
- List of select Jewish football (association; soccer) players
