= Ferry Piekart =

Dutch writer

- Born: 13 October 1974 (age 51); Rotterdam
- Occupation: Author of children's books
- Writing career
- Genre: Children

Ferry Piekart (born 1974) is a Dutch author of children's non-fiction books. His Playing With Stuff – Outrageous Games with Ordinary Objects was published in the United States in 2004 by Kane/Miller Book Publishers.

== Biography ==
Ferry Piekart is a resident of The Hague. He studied journalism and cultural anthropology, and began his career in the Netherlands writing popular-science articles for Dutch magazines. He later began writing articles and stories for children's magazines. Playing With Stuff – Outrageous Games with Ordinary Objects was his first children's book. He also translated a book from Liam O'Donnell - Max Finder 1.

== Bibliography ==
- Paf, af! – Spelletjes met spulletjes (2002)
- Waar komt vandaag vandaan? – Over de geschiedenis van alledaagse dingen (2004)
- Playing With Stuff – Outrageous Games with Ordinary Objects (including some extra games, 2004)
- Pleetime (2007)
- Kijk! het grapjesboek (2016)
- Ik wil sneeuw! (2016)
- Graaf Witlaken en de vlampier (2024)
- De moppen van graaf Witlaken (2024)
- Vooruit op wielen! (2025)
- Avondtuur (2025)

== Sources ==
- Ferry Piekart biography by Gottmer (Dutch)
- Ferry Piekart biography by Kane/Miller
- Official website of Ferry Piekart (Dutch)
