= Jeanne de Loos-Haaxman =

Dutch art historian and writer (1881–1976)

Jeanne Maria Cornelia de Loos-Haaxman
- Born: Jeanne Maria Cornelia de Loos; 3 November 1881; The Hague, Netherlands
- Died: 1 May 1976 (aged 94); Rotterdam, Netherlands
- Occupations: Art historian, writer
- Spouse: Wolter de Loos (d. 1950)
- Children: 4
- Parents: Pieter Anne Haaxman (1847–1935) (father); Janetta Maria Wijnkamp (mother)

Jeanne Maria Cornelia de Loos-Haaxman (3 November 1881 – 1 May 1976) was a Dutch art historian and writer.

== Biography ==
Jeanne Maria Cornelia de Loos was born in 1881 as the youngest daughter of journalist Pieter Anne Haaxman (1847–1935) and his wife Janetta Maria Wijnkamp of The Hague, Netherlands. Jeanne's grandfather was the Delft painter Pieter Alardus Haaxman. (Note: A related Dutch painter, Pieter Haaxman (1854–1937), was Jeanne's cousin, and he is sometimes confused with Jeanne's father who has a similar name.)

Jeanne was trained at the Royal Academy of Art in The Hague where she obtained certificates in drawing and art history. In addition, because of her anatomical drafting skills learned at the Anatomical Laboratory, she enrolled on 24 September 1902 at Leiden University to study medicine.

In 1909, she married the lawyer Wolter de Loos (1878–1950) and they would go on to have a daughter, Jeanne (1910-1973), and three sons; Wolter (1911–1987); Pieter Anne (1914–1974) and Dirk Albert Elisa (1915–1990).

=== Move to Dutch East Indies ===
After short stays in Brussels and in Leiden, the young family left for the Dutch East Indies (now Indonesia), which seemed to offer them more professional opportunities.

While living in Batavia (present day Jakarta), De Loos-Haaxman discovered the poor condition of the government's portrait collection of governors; according to DBNL, "when Mrs. De Loos first saw these portraits in 1924 [they were] ripped and saggy canvases, affected by insects." She advised the governor-general to restore the portraits and subsequently she was put in charge of the country's painting collection. 1925, a budget for the restoration was passed by the national government and a Dutch art restorer who had recently traveled to the area took over the actual work. In that same year, she took an appointment as unpaid curator of the country's art collection.

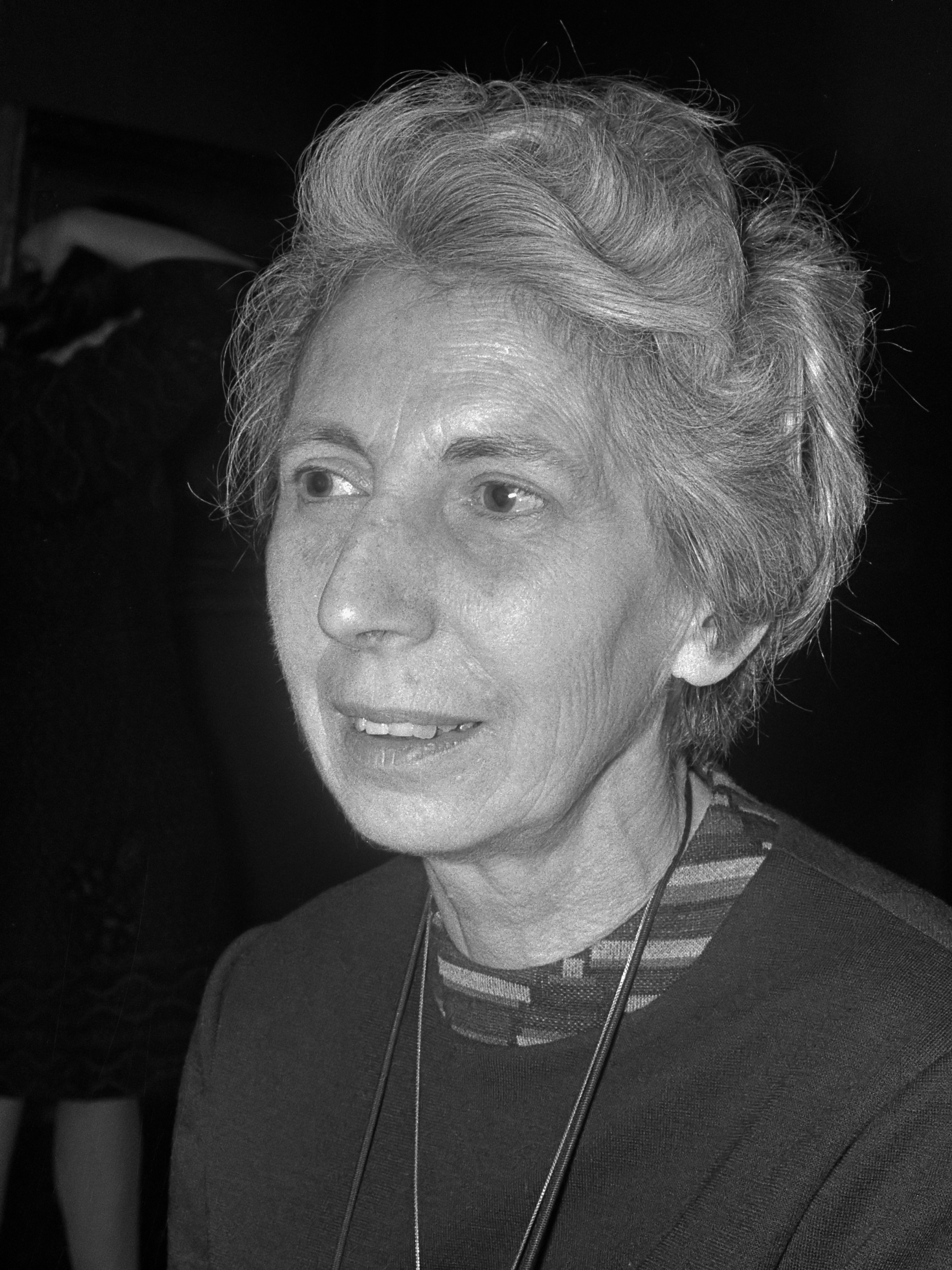
Daughter Jeanne Terwen-de Loos (in 1972)

This was also the start of De Loos-Haaxman's historical study of the art of Western artists in the Dutch East Indies, which became the subject of her two-volume work, Verlaat report Indië. She also began documenting the art inventory of private owners in the area.

Working as a teacher between 1927 and 1932, De Loos-Haaxman instructed students in art history and drawing at a new school in Batavia.

=== Writings ===
From 1928 on, De Loos-Haaxman wrote about art in books and the periodical Java Messenger.

Besides four catalogs about major exhibitions at the Kunstkring Art Gallery in Jakarta, she published multiple articles in the Magazine for Indian Language, Land and Ethnology.

=== Return to the Netherlands ===
After her husband retired in 1939, the family moved back to the Netherlands, in Leiden. There, De Loos-Haaxman published extensively. In addition to historical research, several contributions appeared in genealogical journals and historical-topographically oriented yearbooks.

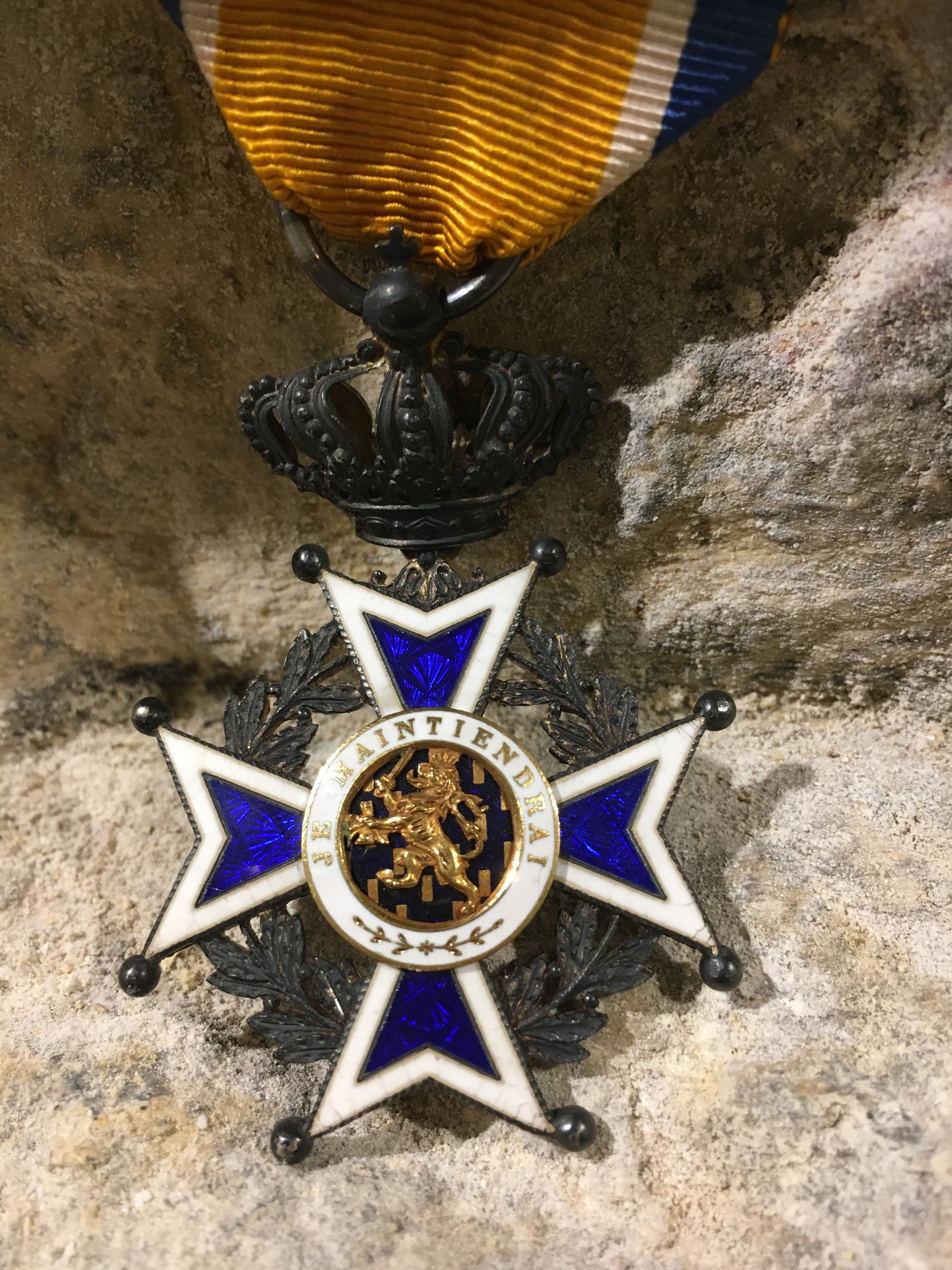
Medal, Knight in the Order of Orange-Nassau

On the death of her husband in 1950, De Loos-Haaxman began a long collaboration with her daughter Jeanne Terwen-de Loos (1910–1973). She wrote the introduction for the exhibition catalog for Dutch painters and illustrators in the East: 17th-20th century, which was written by her daughter for an exhibition that ran from 19 October 1972 to 10 December 1972 at the famed Rijksmuseum, Amsterdam. The exhibition was organized in collaboration with the Cultural History of the Dutch Overseas Foundation, which was co-founded by De Loos-Haaxman based on her work in the two-volume reference text: Verlaat rapport Indië.

She died in Rotterdam, Netherlands, on 1 May 1976 at the age of 94.

== Honors ==
- 1935, appointed a Knight in the Order of Orange-Nassau.
- 1945, appointed a member of the Society of Dutch Literature.

== Selected publications ==
According to Worldcat.org, De Loos-Haaxman has 69 works in 139 publications in 3 languages in libraries around the world including the following titles.

- Tentoonstelling van chineesche kunst: catalogs, (1923) by J. de Loos-Haaxman
- Johannes Rach aan de Kaap, (1928) by J. de Loos-Haaxman
- Museum van den Bataviaschen Kunstkring: tweede collectie Regnault: catalogus (1936), by J. de Loos-Haaxman
- Dagwerk in Indië, hommage aan een verstild verleden, (1941) by J. de Loos-Haaxman
- De Landsverzameling Schilderijen in Batavia; landvoogdsportretten en Compagnieschilders, by J. de Loos-Haaxman
- Verlaat rapport Indië. Drie eeuwen Westerse schilders, tekenaars, grafici, zilversmeden en kunstnijveren in Nederlands-Idië, (1968) by J. de Loos-Haaxman
- De Franse schilder Ernest Hardouin in Batavia, (1982) by J. de Loos-Haaxman (published posthumously)
