= Johnny Roeg =

Dutch footballer (1910–2003)

Personal information
- Full name: Nathan Roeg
- Date of birth: 6 January 1910
- Place of birth: Amsterdam, Netherlands
- Date of death: 21 October 2003 (aged 93)
- Position: Striker

Senior career*
Years	Team	Apps	(Gls)
1934–1936	Ajax	26	(16)
- * Club domestic league appearances and goals

Nathan "Johnny" Roeg (6 January 1910 – 21 October 2003) was a Dutch footballer who played as a striker for Ajax.

Roeg was Jewish, and was one of only six Jewish players to have played for Ajax - the others being Eddy Hamel, Bennie Muller, Sjaak Swart, Daniël de Ridder and Ilan Boccara. During the Holocaust, he hid from the Nazis and managed to avoid being captured, while about 80 per cent of his fellow Amsterdam Jews were killed.
