= Valerie Frissen =

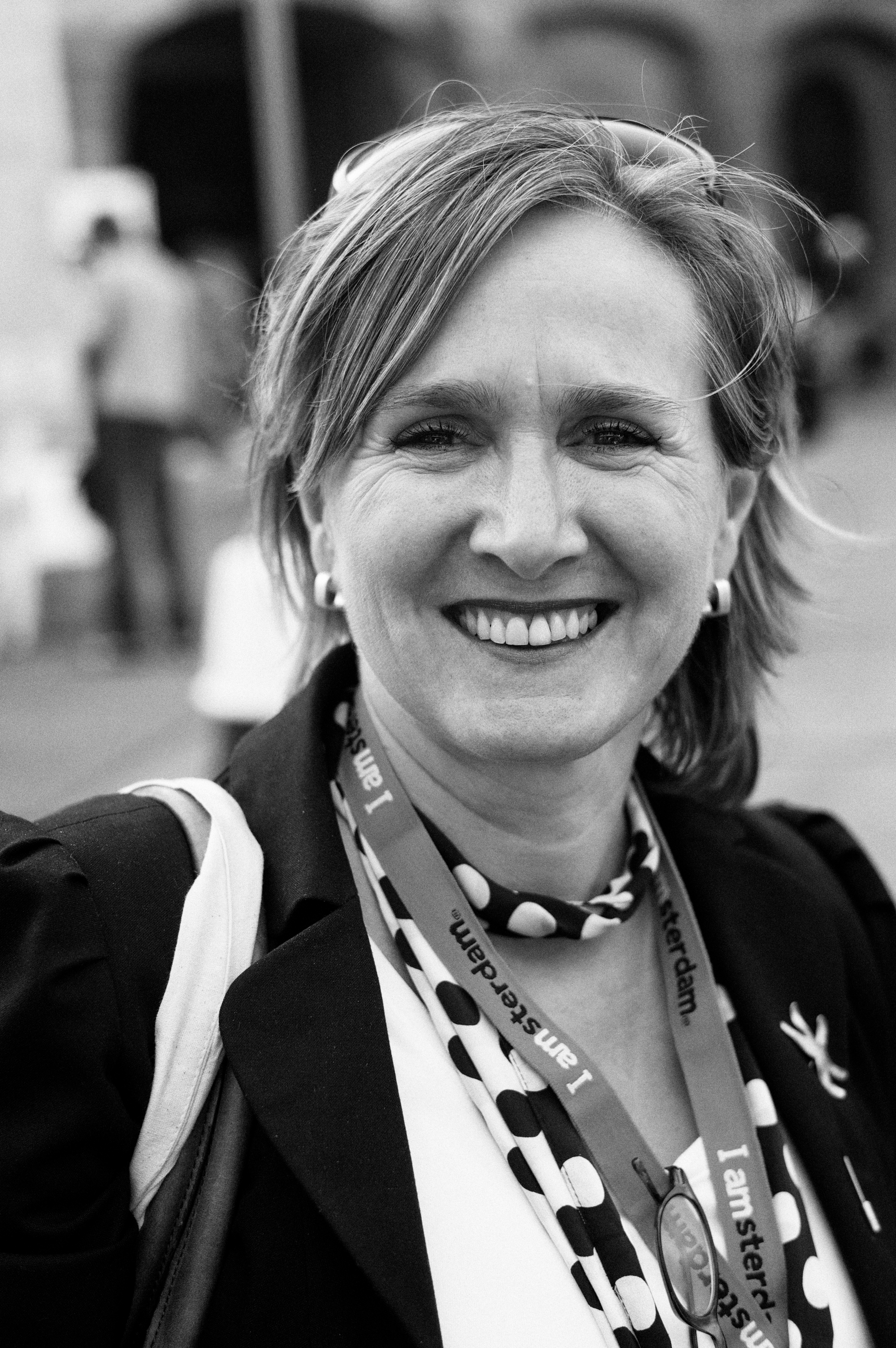
Valerie Frissen, 2009

Valerie Frissen (born 1960 in Puth) holds the extraordinary professorship in ‘ICT and Social Change’ at the Faculty of Philosophy at the Erasmus University Rotterdam where she belongs to the group of Professor Dr. Jos de Mul. The chair is sponsored by the Dutch governmental research organization TNO, where Valerie Frissen is also head of the ICT & Policy department of TNO Information and Communication Technology. She is also a member of the board of Het Expertise Centrum (HEC) in The Hague.

== Scholar career ==
Frissen graduated with a doctoral (master) degree in communication science from the Catholic University of Nijmegen (now known as the Radboud University Nijmegen) where she also obtained her PhD.

== Publications ==
- Brants, K., & Frissen, V. (2000). Inclusion and exclusion in the Information Society. Final Deliverable to the European Media and Technology Everyday Life Network, 2003.
- Frissen, V. (1992). Trapped in Electronic Cages? Gender and New Information Technologies in the Public and Private Domain: An Overview of Research. Media, Culture and Society, 14(1), 31–49.
- Frissen, V. (1994). The domestification of the telephone. Domestic technology and everyday life: Mutual shaping processes. Proceedings from COST A, 4, 28–30.
- Frissen, V. (1995). Gender is calling: Some reflections on past, present and future uses of the telephone. The gender–technology relation.
- Frissen, V. (1996). Gender, ICTs and Everyday Life. Luxembourg: Office for Official Publications of the European Communities.
- Frissen, V. (1997). Gender, ITCs and Everyday Life: Mutual Shaping Processes: European Commission.
- Frissen, V. (2000). ICTs in the Rush Hour of Life. The Information Society, 16(1), 65-75.
- Frissen, V. (2000). Under Construction. Persoonlijke en culturele identiteit in het multimediatijdperk. Infodrome.
- Frissen, V. (2001). De schaduwdemocratie: ICT en maatschappelijke participatie: s. n.
- Frissen, V. (2004). De domesticatie van de digitale wereld: Erasmus Universiteit.
- Frissen, V., & de Mul, J. (2000). Under construction: persoonlijke en culturele identiteit in het multimediatijdperk: Infodrome.
- Frissen, V., & Punie, Y. (1997). Never mind the gap: integrating qualitative and quantitative methods in ICT-User-Research: the case of busy households, paper presentado en el Sexto Workshop del grupo EMTEL: Barcelona.
- Frissen, V., & Punie, Y. (2001). Present users, future homes–A theoretical perspective on acceptance and use of ICT in the home environment: TNO rapport STB-01-30a. Delft: TNO.
- Frissen, V., & Zaat-Jones, J. (1999). ICT en arbeid in het dagelijks leven: Rathenau Instituut.
- Servaes, J., & Frissen, V. (1997). De interpretatieve benadering in de communicatiewetenschap: theorie, methodologie en case-studies: Acco.
- Van Audenhove, L., Cammaerts, B., Frissen, V., Engels, L., & Ponsioen, A. Transnational Civil Society in the Networked Society.
