= List of climbing knots =

There are many types of knots that are commonly used in the pursuit of rock climbing, ice climbing, and general mountaineering, the most popular of which are listed below.

== List ==
Bends
Beer knot: The Beer knot is often used in tubular webbing, usually for making slings.
Double fisherman knot (also known as Grapevine): The Grapevine knot is useful to tie together two ends of ropes. Ropes can be of unequal sizes. It is often used to tie both ends of the same rope together to form a circle.
Triple fisherman's knot
Overhand bend (also known as European death knot, Euro death knot, EDK): The Overhand bend is a simple and fast way to join two ropes, notably for rappelling. Can be very useful in situations where speed is critical to safety. It is similar to a water knot, but both bitter ends come out the same side of the knot.
Water knot (also known as Tape Knot, Double Overhand Bend, Ring Bend): The Water knot is useful to tie together two ends of ropes. Often used with webbing.
Binding
Strangle knot: The Strangle knot is a simple binding knot. It forms both sides of a Double fisherman's knot, and is also used to back up loop knots and both ends of bends.
Hitches
Bachmann knot: The Bachmann knot is useful when the friction hitch needs to be reset quickly/often or made to be self-tending as in crevasse and self-rescue.
Clove hitch: The Clove hitch is used in belay systems among other things.
Italian hitch (also known as Munter hitch, HMS): The Italian hitch is a simple knot, used by climbers and cavers as part of a life-lining or belay system. Its main use is as a friction device for controlling the rate of descent in belay systems.
Klemheist knot: The Klemheist knot is an alternative to the Prusik knot, useful when the climber is short of cord but has plenty of webbing.
Prusik: The Prusik is a knot used mainly for emergency use. Some carry between one and three cords specifically for prusiks. One can be used to quickly secure a person's position to correct problems with equipment; two can be used as a method of ascending a rope.
Blake's hitch: Blake's hitch is widely used in tree climbing applications. The knot can be slid up and down a line manually, but when loaded, it sticks securely.
Girth hitch: This hitch is commonly used to attach loops of runner to harnesses, bags, other kinds of equipment, and to natural features like rock knobs or brush/tree trunks for protection.
Loop Knots
Alpine butterfly knot: The Alpine Butterfly is a strong and secure loop knot. Allows load distribution in multiple directions. It can also be used to isolate a worn section of rope.
Figure-of-eight loop: The Figure-of-eight loop is considered strong and secure. Can be tied by taking a bight of rope and tying a figure-of-eight knot, or can be tied directly around/through objects by weaving back through the first figure eight knot (Figure-of-eight follow through), which is the standard method for attaching a rope to a climbing harness.
Directional Figure-of-eight Loop: The Inline figure-of-eight loop is similar to a figure-of-eight loop but used to form a loop that will be loaded longitudinally in a line under tension. Particularly useful in rope tightening systems where the loop is established as a means to secure a pulley or carabiner onto the main line to reduce the amount of work needed to tighten the entire system. Similar to a trucker's hitch.
Double bowline: The double bowline is commonly used by sport climbers who take multiple lead falls and then have trouble untying their figure eights.
Double Figure Eight Loop (also known as Bunny Ears): Used for equalising two anchors using the rope.
Yosemite bowline: Also called a bowline with a Yosemite finish, this is another way of tying the rope to the harness.
Bowline on a bight: Used for equalizing anchors.
Stopper Knots
Stevedore knot (also known as Double figure eight): The Stevedore knot is tied at the end of a rope to prevent the end from unraveling, slipping through another knot, or passing back through a hole, block, or belay/rappel device. It is more bulky and less prone to jamming than the closely related figure-of-eight knot.
Overhand knot: The Overhand knot is a component of many knots used in climbing.
Monkey's fist: The Monkey's Fist is used to tie the end of a climbing rope into a tight ball so the rope can be thrown farther/easier.
