= Climbing harness =

Item of climbing equipment

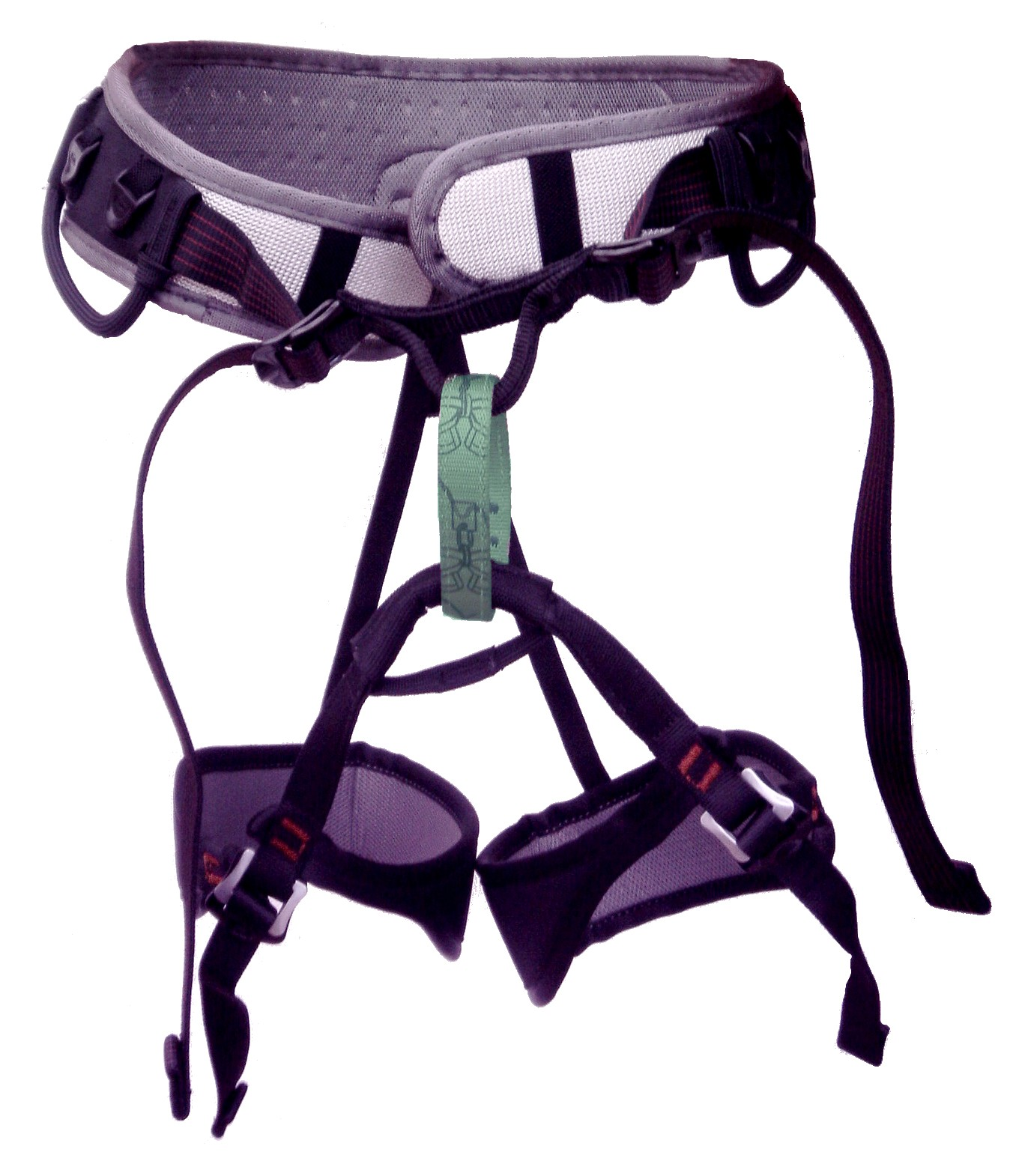
Sit harness

A climbing harness is a piece of equipment that allows a climber to tie in to the safety of a rope. It is used in rock and ice climbing, abseiling, and lowering; this is in contrast to other activities requiring ropes for access or safety such as industrial rope work (such as window cleaning), construction, and rescue and recovery, which use safety harnesss instead.

== Overview ==
While an improvised harness can be created out of a length of rope or nylon webbing, commercially produced harnesses specific to climbing rock and ice are the norm. These characteristically include a dedicated tie-in loop, padding, and amenities such as gear loops. Most commercial climbing harnesses meet the guidelines and manufacturing standards of organizations such as the Union Internationale des Associations d'Alpinisme (UiAA) or European Committee for Standardization.

Harnesses of users involved in climbing should be attached to dynamic (kernmantle) rope, which has a natural shock-absorbing stretch. In via ferrata, the harness is attached to metal cables via a shock absorber that can absorb some of the impact of a fall.

The most common knot for attaching a harness to a rope is the figure-eight follow through, characteristically backed up by a stopper knot. Although it is harder to untie after a fall than some alternatives, it is inherently more secure, easier to tie, and easier to verify that it has been tied correctly. There are many variations of the bowline knot, including a variation of the double bowline, and some will untie themselves when repeatedly stressed and unstressed, as is common in climbing.

A harness' gear loops, used for carrying such equipment as protection devices, carabiners, etc., are not weight-bearing; nor are the elastic cords which restrain the leg loops from slipping down while not under load.

== History ==
The invention of the climbing harness has been attributed to Jeanne Immink, a Dutch climber in the late nineteenth century. Some of the first climbing harnesses were devised in the U.K. in the early 1960s by Alan Waterhouse, Paul Seddon and Tony Howard who went on to form the Troll climbing equipment manufacturers. A harness designed by British climber Don Whillans was made by Troll for the 1970 Annapurna South Face Expedition. It went into mass production shortly afterwards and soon became popular worldwide.

The sit or seat harness was invented in the 1960s by Yosemite climbers. The first innovation was the Swami Belt, which was multiple loops of webbing around the waist. Then quickly came the Swami Seat, a sit harness tied from webbing revealed to the climbing world thru an article in Summit Magazine in the mid-60s, which included leg loops and an integrated waist loop. Once the seat/sit harness came to be, suppliers of climbing gear started making them with stitching replacing the knots.

== Types ==
Sling harness

A sit harness consists of a waist belt and two leg loops which are normally connected in the front of the hips through a permanent webbing loop called a belay loop. Belay loops are extremely strong, but nonetheless still a single point of failure that caused at least one notorious death. For rock climbing, the rope typically goes through the two "tie-in loops" that are above and below the "belay loop". The figure-eight knot is mostly used for rock climbing. These are the most commonly used harnesses for recreational activities such as abseiling and rock climbing, as they afford a wide range of movement while still maintaining a high level of safety. Ensuring the harness fits correctly is key to avoiding pain in the upper thigh area caused by the leg loops being too tight around the upper legs and groin area, while at the same time ensuring that a climber flipped over in a fall does not slip out. The waist belt should be tightened snugly.

A chest harness is worn around the shoulders, usually with a sit harness so as to provide an additional attachment point. This attachment point allows for better balance in some situations such as when carrying a heavy pack (as the centre of mass is above the connection to the rope) and when the person in the harness may be unable to maintain an upright position (due to injury or other influences).

A sling harness is an improvised harness made from pieces of sling.

=== Safety ===
In a study conducted, researchers came to a conclusion that there was no statistically significant evidence revealing a pattern between harness type and severity of climbing accidents. Direct rock contact in rock climbing was the main reason for injury, not the type of climbing harness used.

== Materials ==
Most harnesses are made from nylon webbing, specifically, Nylon 66. Aspects are often tubular rather than flat. Different weaves are used depending on a component's function. These sometimes include polyester. Buckles are typically made of anodized aluminum. Foam and mesh are integrated into the leg loops and waist belt to make them more comfortable. Harness designers adapt increasingly advanced materials such as Ultra High Molecular Weight Polyethylene (UHMWPE), aramid fibers (Kevlar, Vectran, etc.), and sailcloth to make harnesses lighter and more comfortable.

== See also ==
- Rock-climbing equipment
- Glossary of climbing terms
