= Fusion knot =

Type of knot

Karash double loop
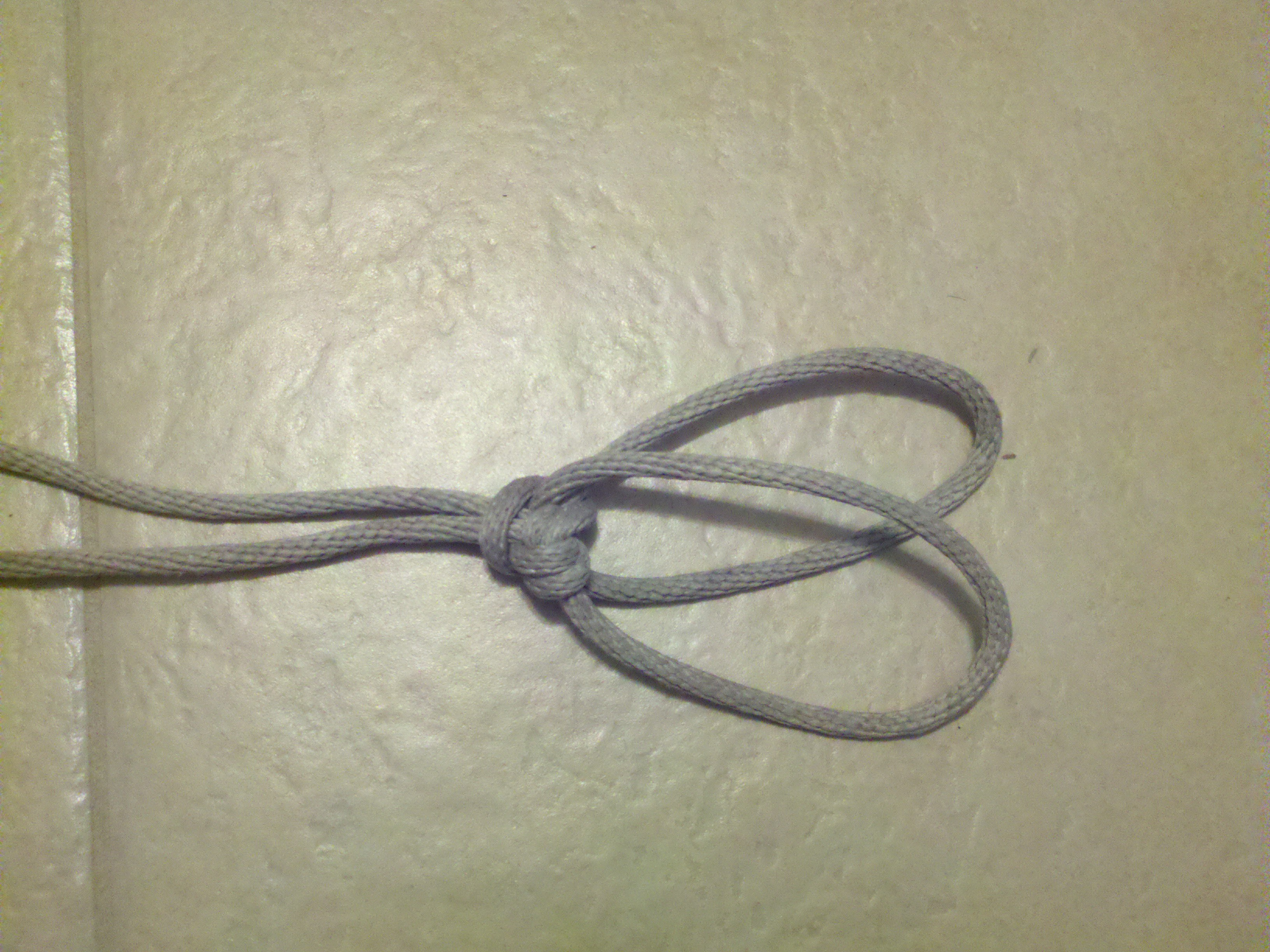
- Category: Loop
- Efficiency: 49-72% (12.5 mm static)
- Typical use: climbing, rope rescue

Karash double loop is a common name for a knot forming two loops. This knot has been a known variant of the Bowline on a bight per the International Guild of Knot Tyers, referred to as bowline twist or twisted collar bowline on a bight. The knot is also referred to as nœud de fusion in French references and sometimes called Fusion knot in English.

The name Karash double loop was introduced by Mike Karash, who re-invented the knot to create makeshift harnesses for rescue operations and popularized it among rescue workers.

== Applications ==
The knot is used for vertical caving using the single rope technique, particularly by French cavers. It is advertised by the French Federation of Speleology as a safe alternative to the bowline on a bight. Compared to the traditional double loop variant of the figure of eight, its loops remain open under load allowing to clip and unclip carabiners in the loops more easily.

The knot is also popular to create a makeshift harness in rescue operations. The two loops are used as leg loops to sit in. The knot can be further improved by adding two bowlines around a person's body to create a three-point harness.

== Technique ==
The traditional method of tying this knot starts with a reverse loop (like the Eskimo bowline) then wraps around the standing end (AKA the "tree"), you then finish the knot the same way as the BOAB – Bowline on a bight.

An alternative way as advertised by the French Federation of Speleology and Mike Karash is starting with a figure of eight on a bight, then pulls two strands of the rope back through the bight.

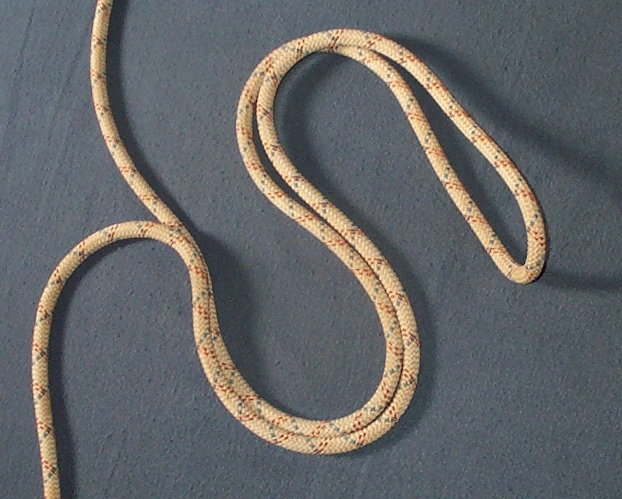
Start with a bight of rope

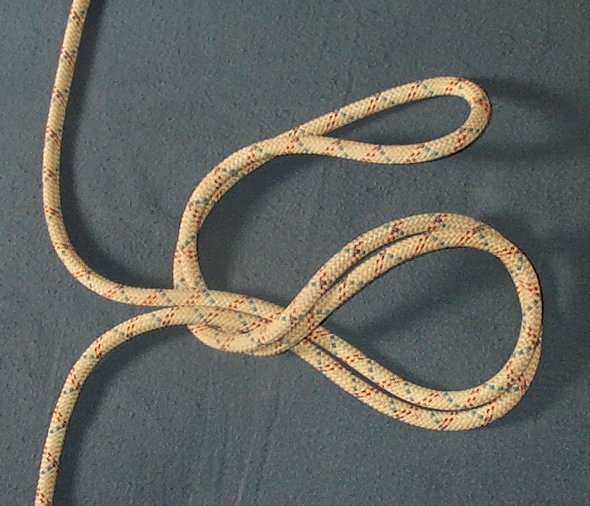
Tie a figure of eight on the bight

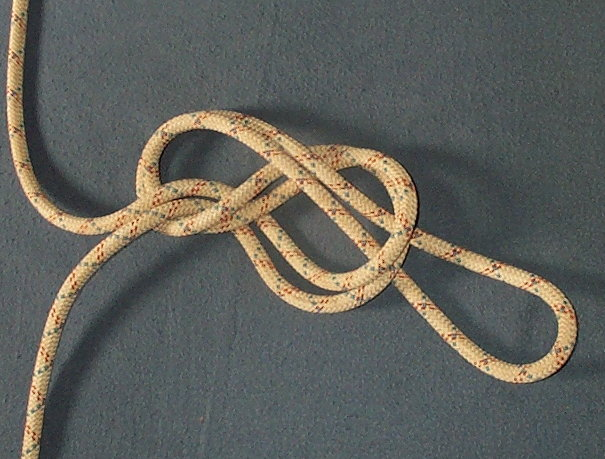

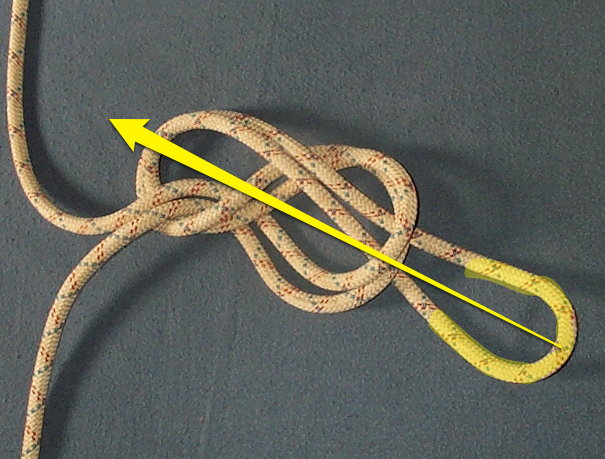
Pull the loop of the figure of eight over the whole knot

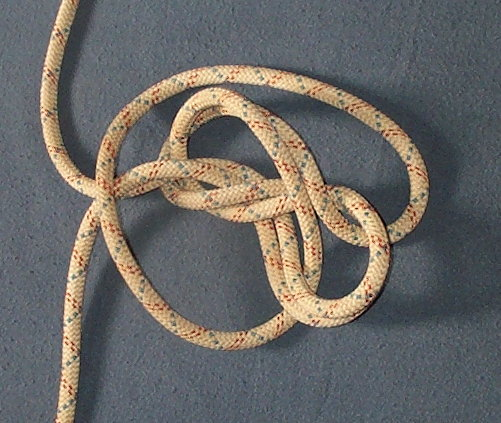

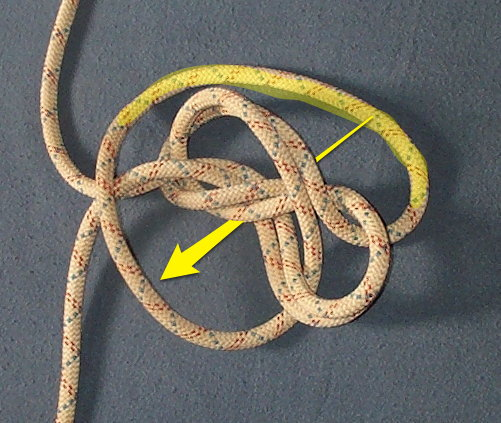

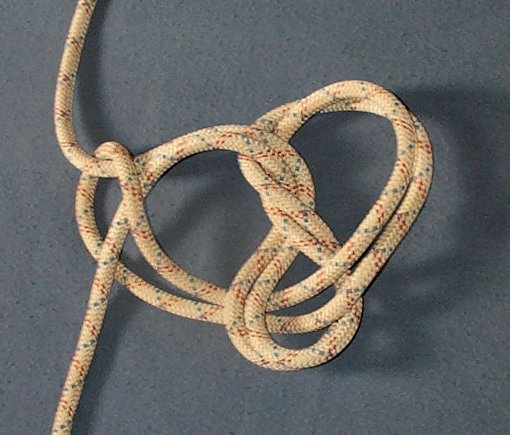
Take the two strands of rope together

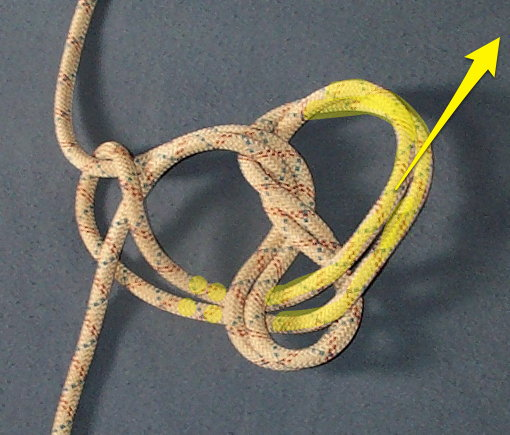
Pull back the two strands of rope closest to the loop inside the knot

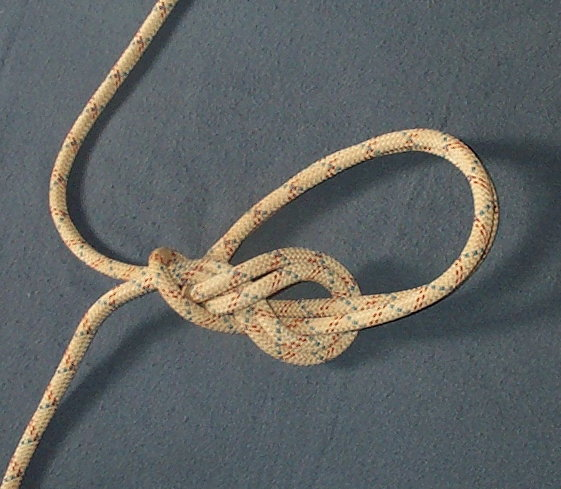
These two form the final two loops of the knot

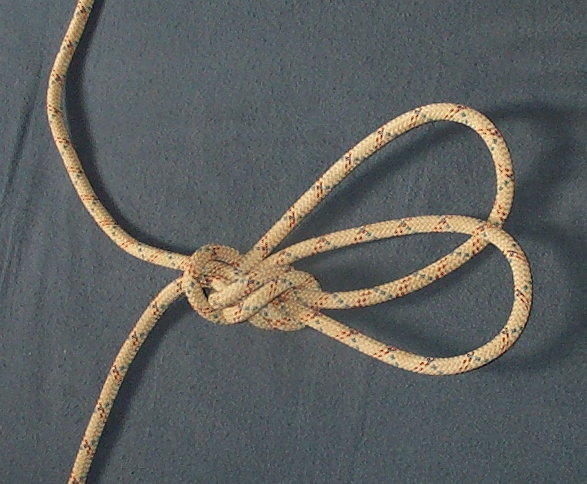
Tighten and dress the knot
