= Figure-of-nine loop =

Type of knot

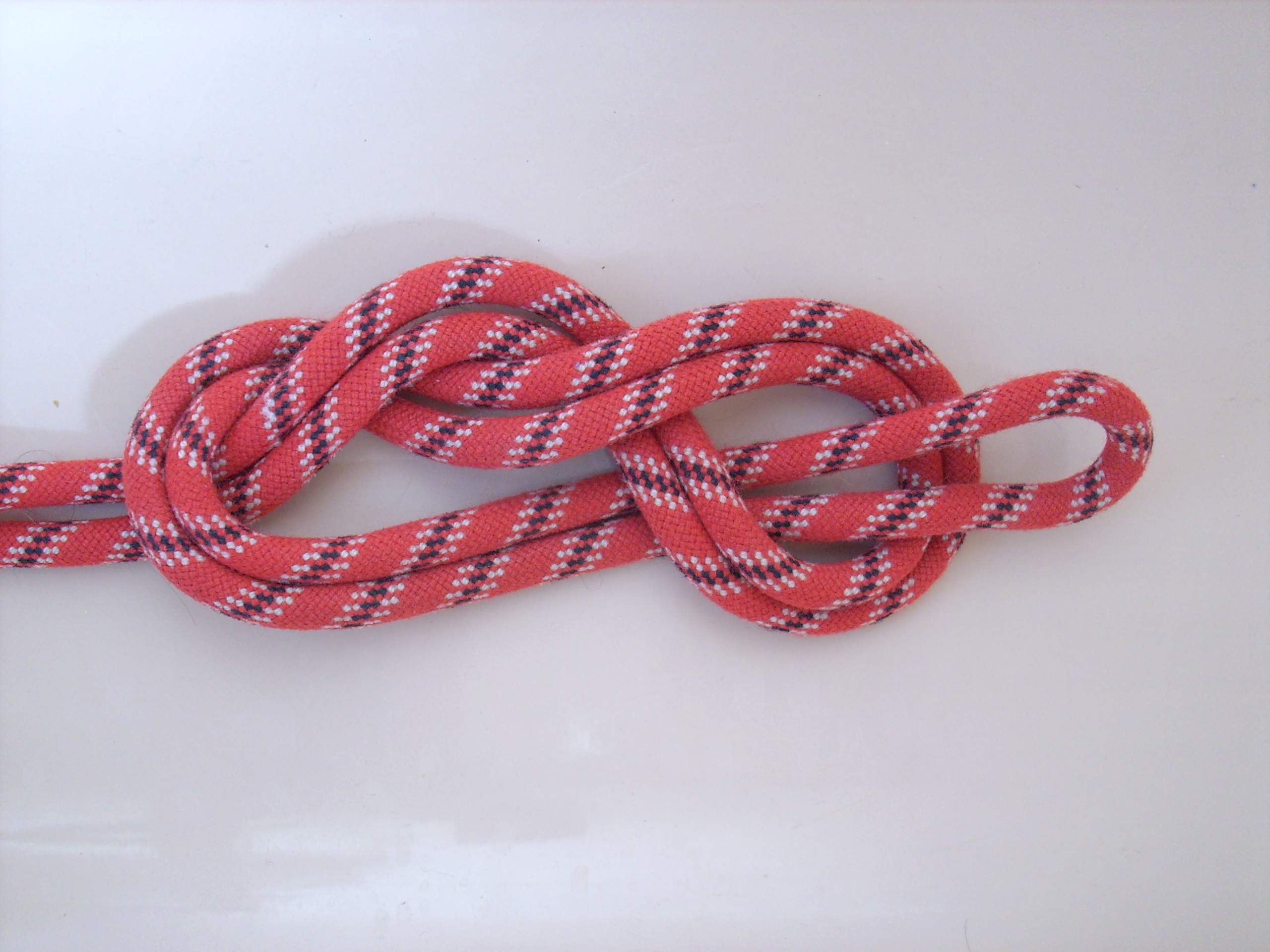
- Names: Figure-of-nine loop, Figure-nine loop
- Category: Loop
- Related: Figure-eight knot, Figure-of-eight follow through, Figure-of-eight loop, Stevedore knot
- Typical use: Caving

The figure-of-nine loop is a type of knot to form a fixed loop in a rope. Tied in the bight, it is made similarly to a figure-of-eight loop but with an extra half-turn before finishing the knot.

Also similar to the stevedore loop, the figure-nine loop is generally shown as being based on an intermediate form between the figure-eight knot and the stevedore knot. The Ashley Book of Knots shows this intermediate knot, in stopper form, as #521.

While it uses more rope and is bulkier than the figure-of-eight loop, the figure-nine loop is somewhat stronger and less likely to jam. It is sometimes used instead of a figure-of-eight loop to attach a rope to an anchor point or belay.

== Tying ==
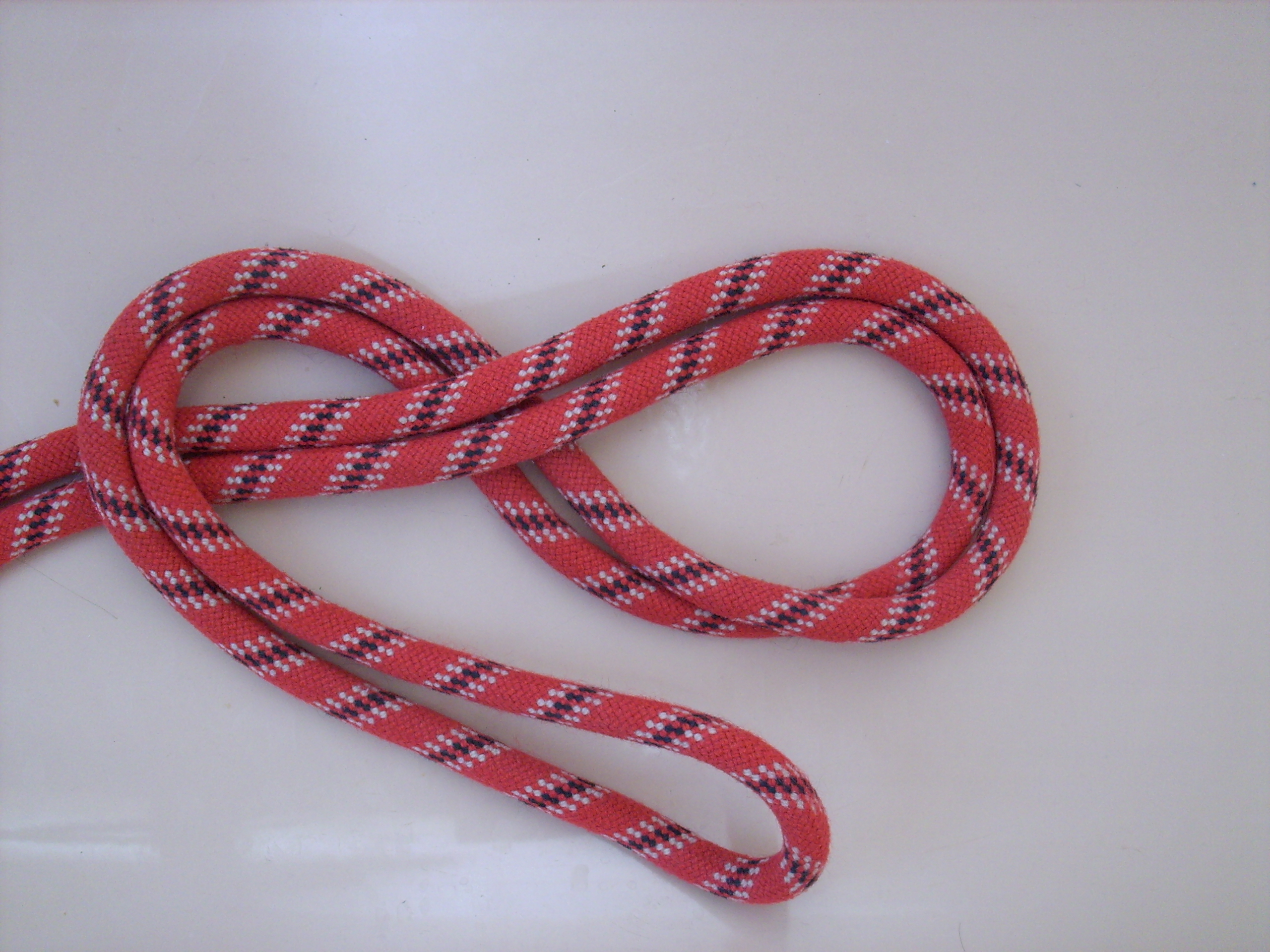

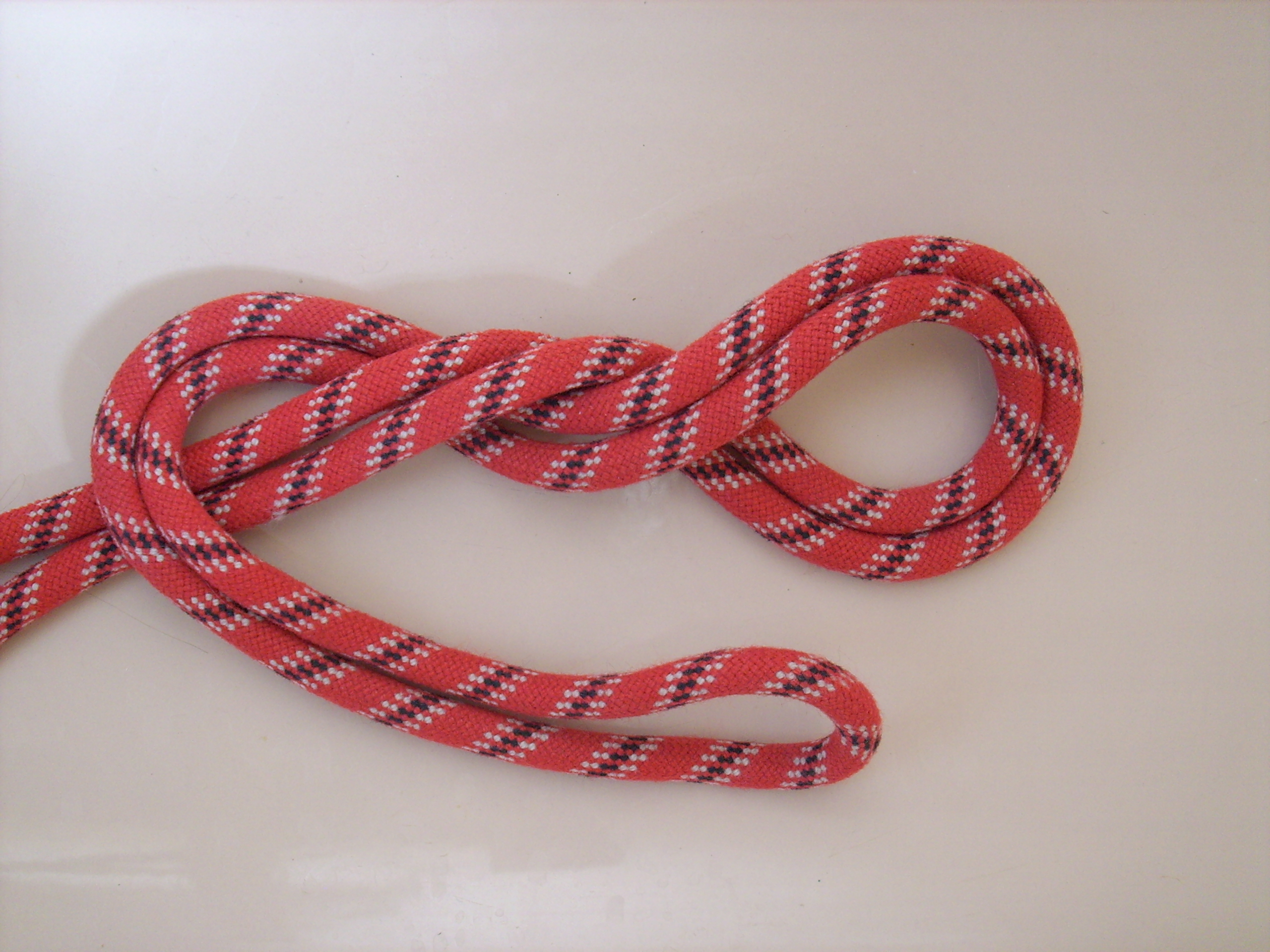

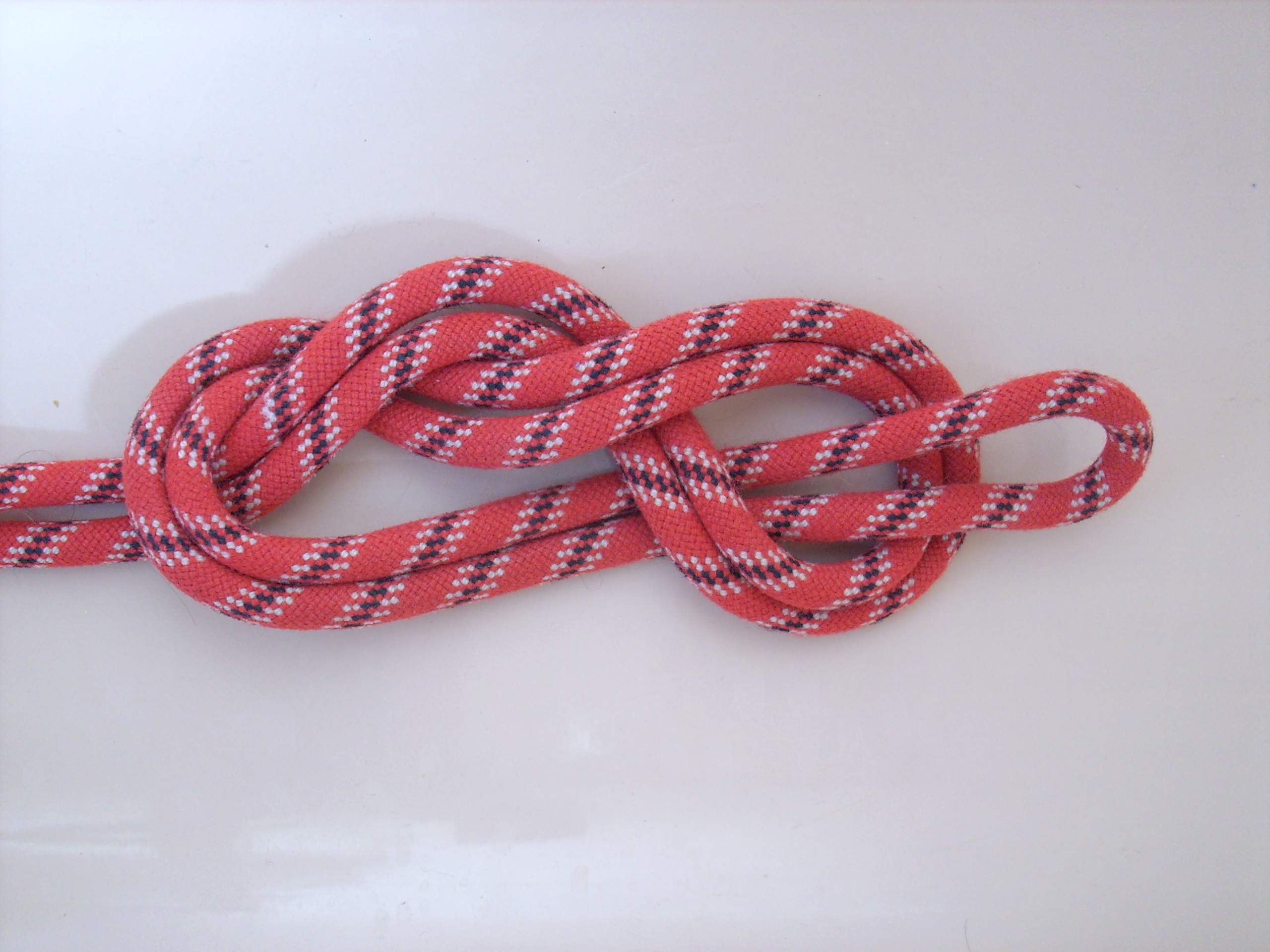

== Figure-of-nine knot ==
The knot can also be tied with the end of a rope - a single strand replaces the double strand, and therefore a naked end replaces the loop. This knot can be rearranged to form a stopper knot, in the same manner as a figure-of-eight stopper knot.

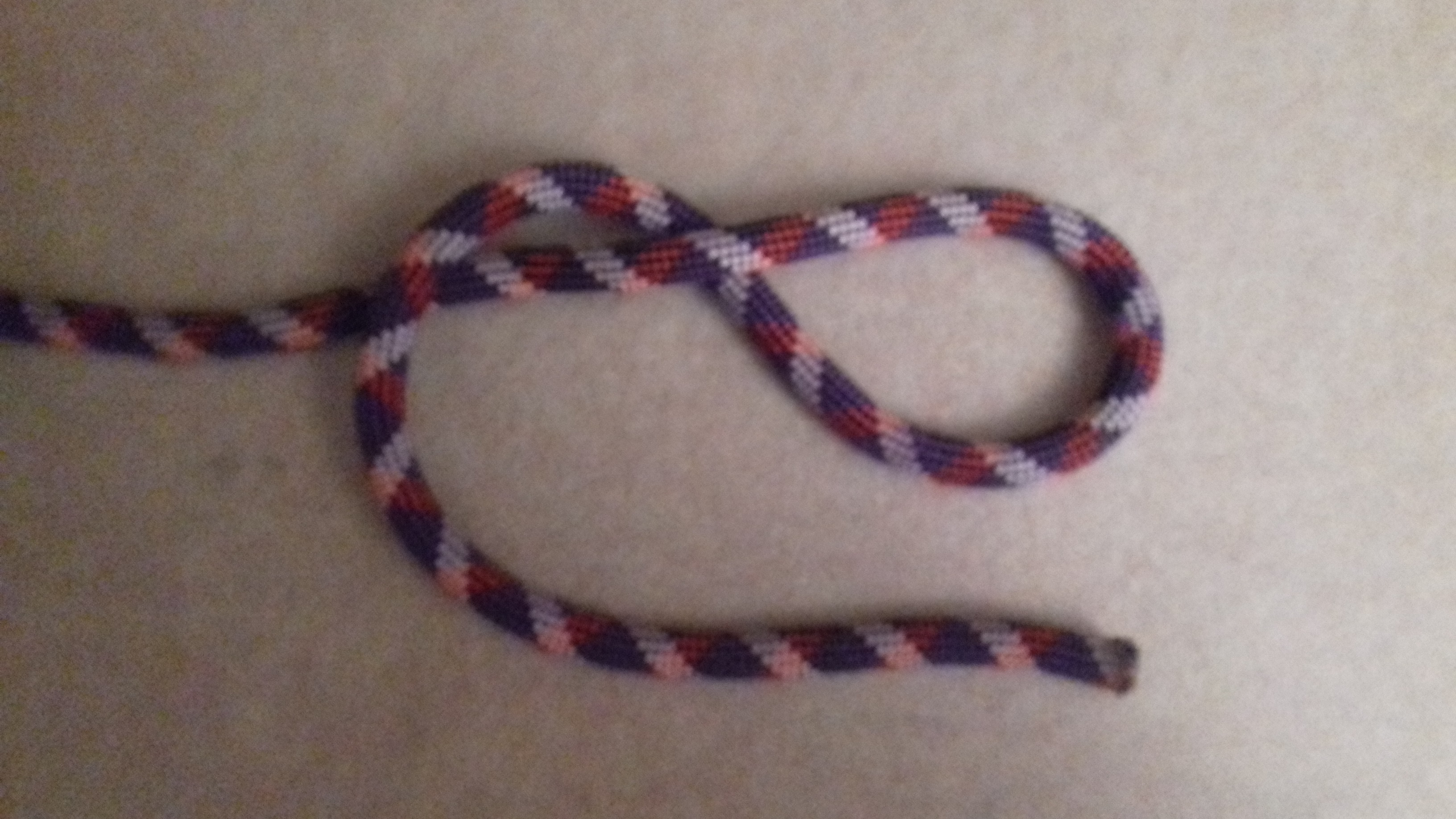

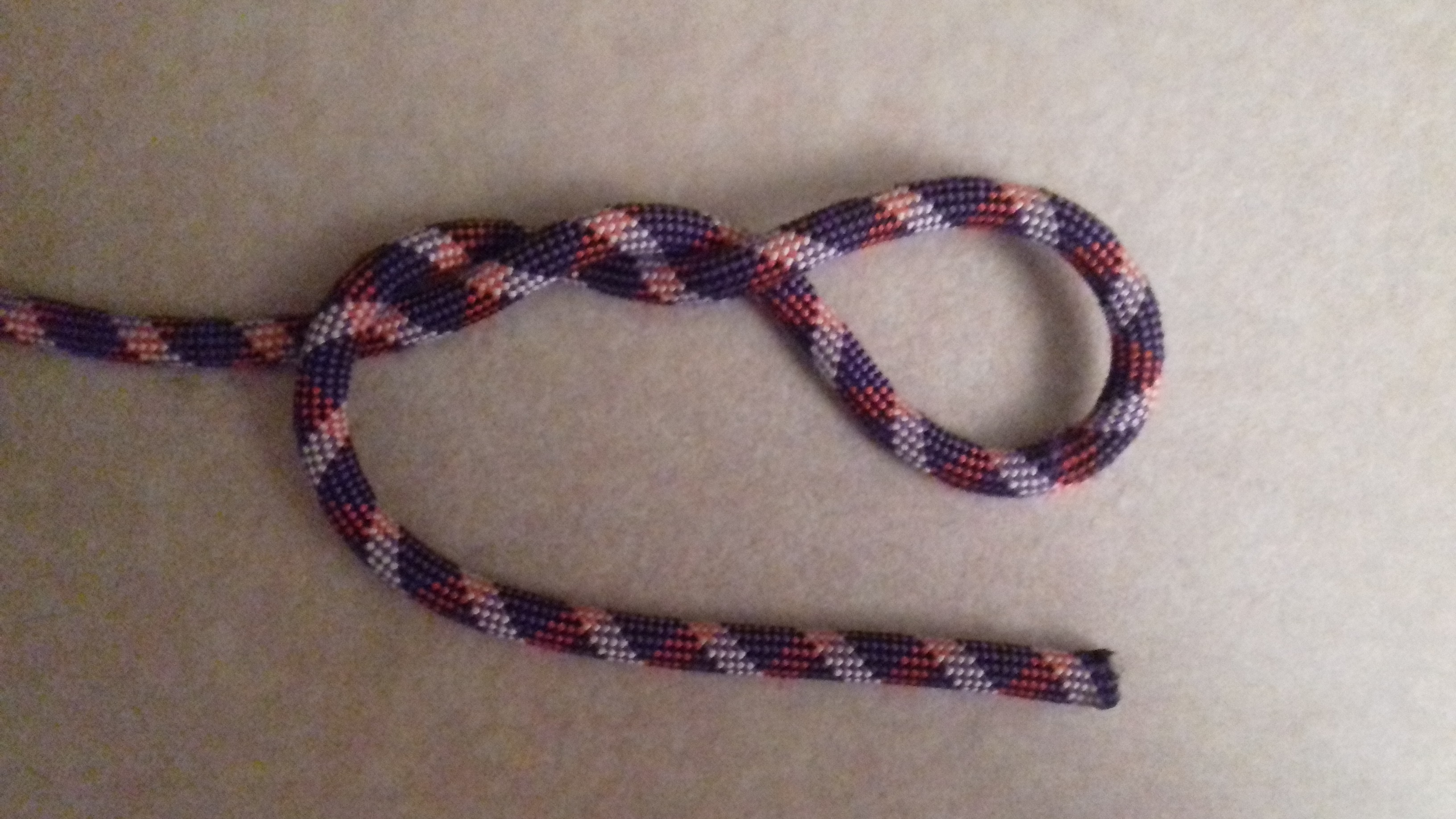

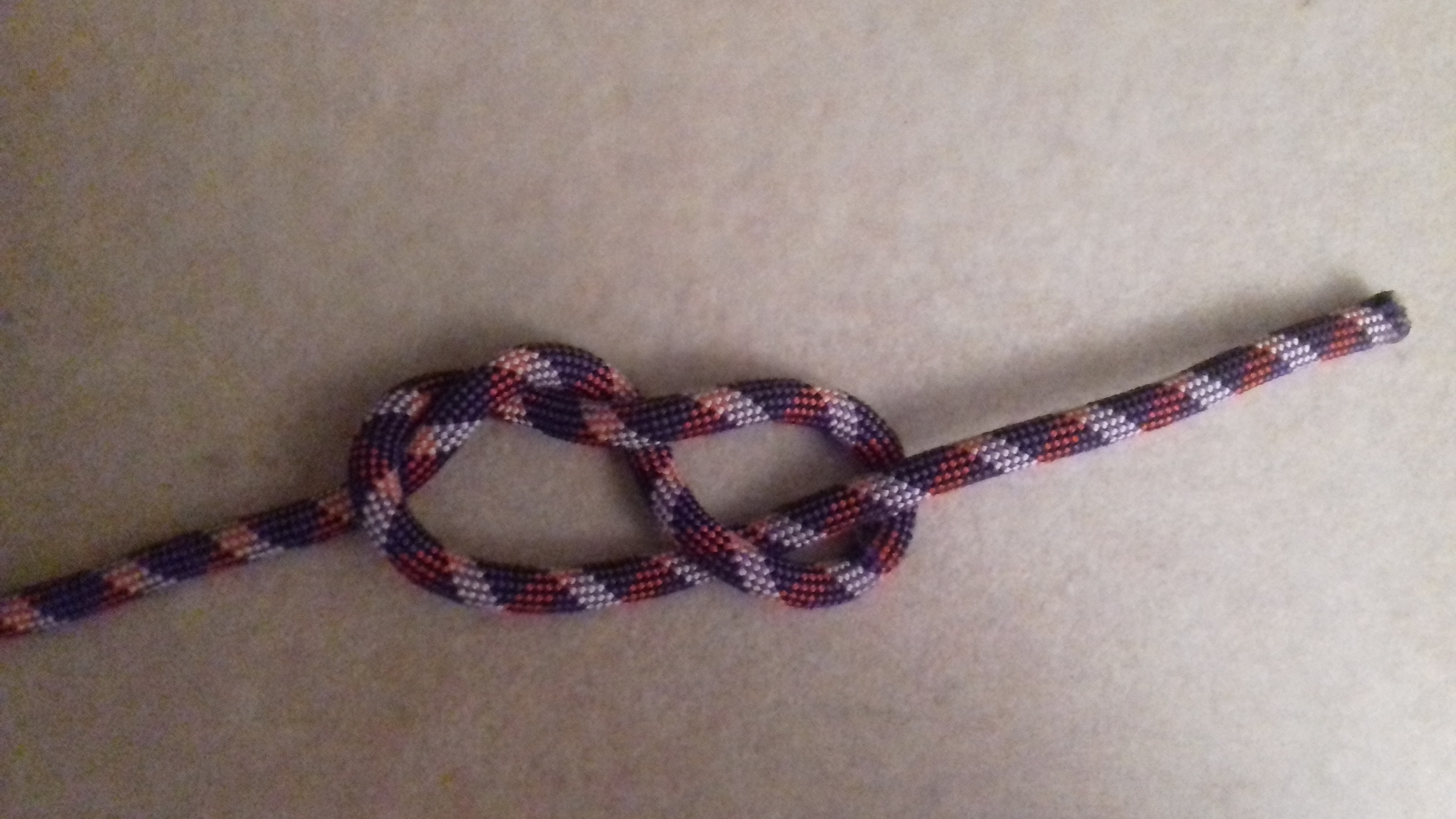

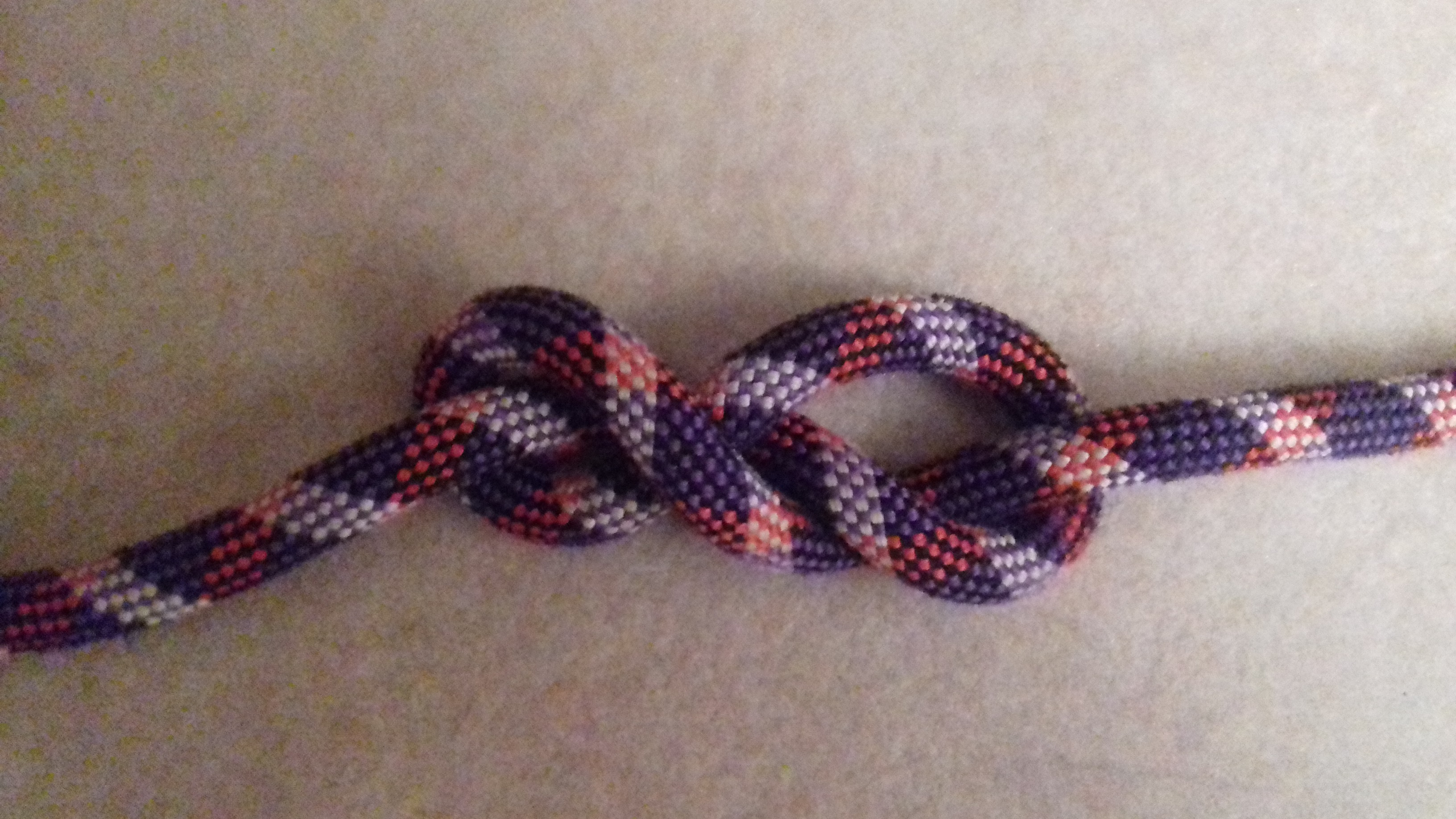

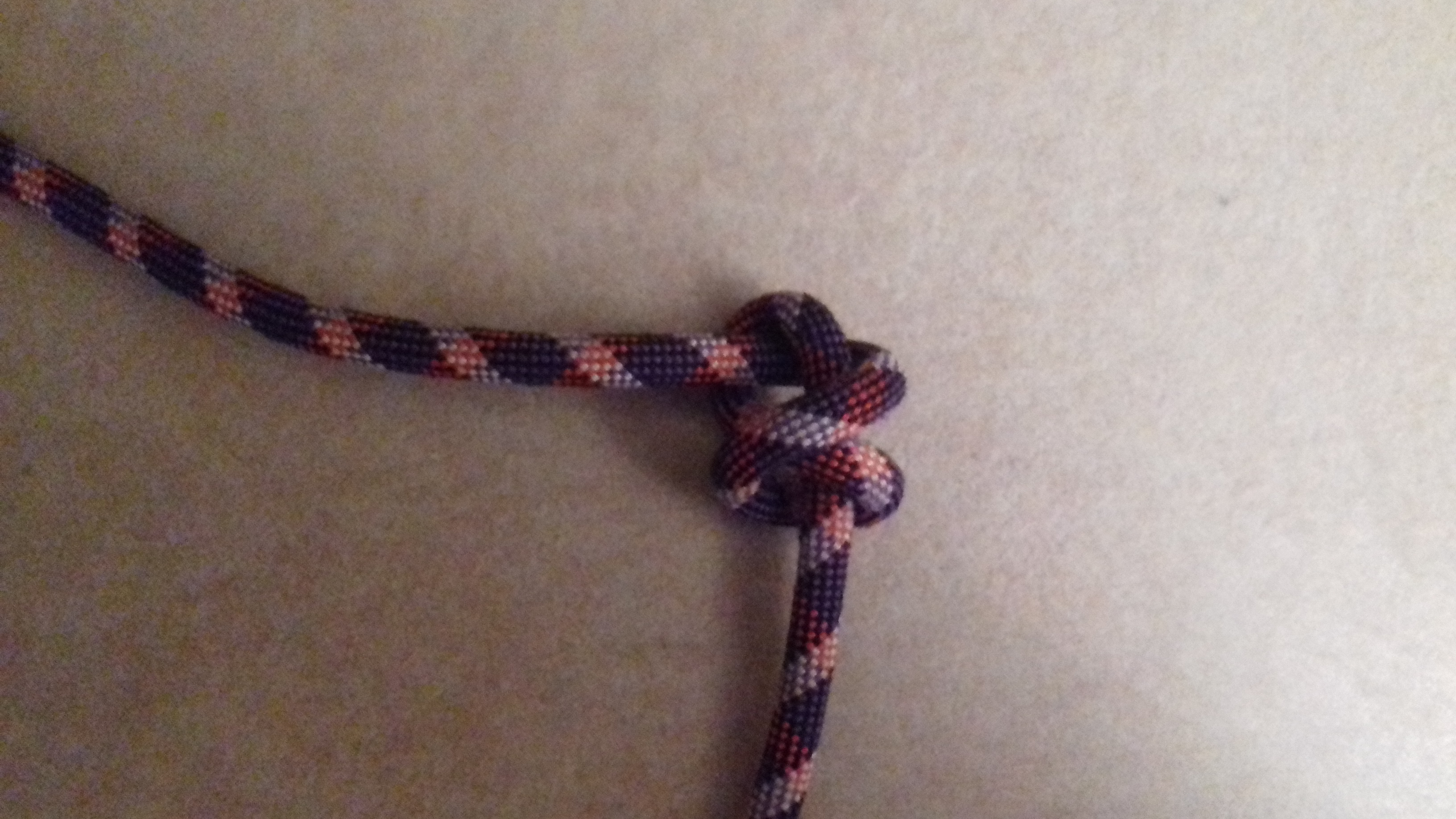
