= Yosemite bowline =

Loop knot often perceived as having better security than a bowline

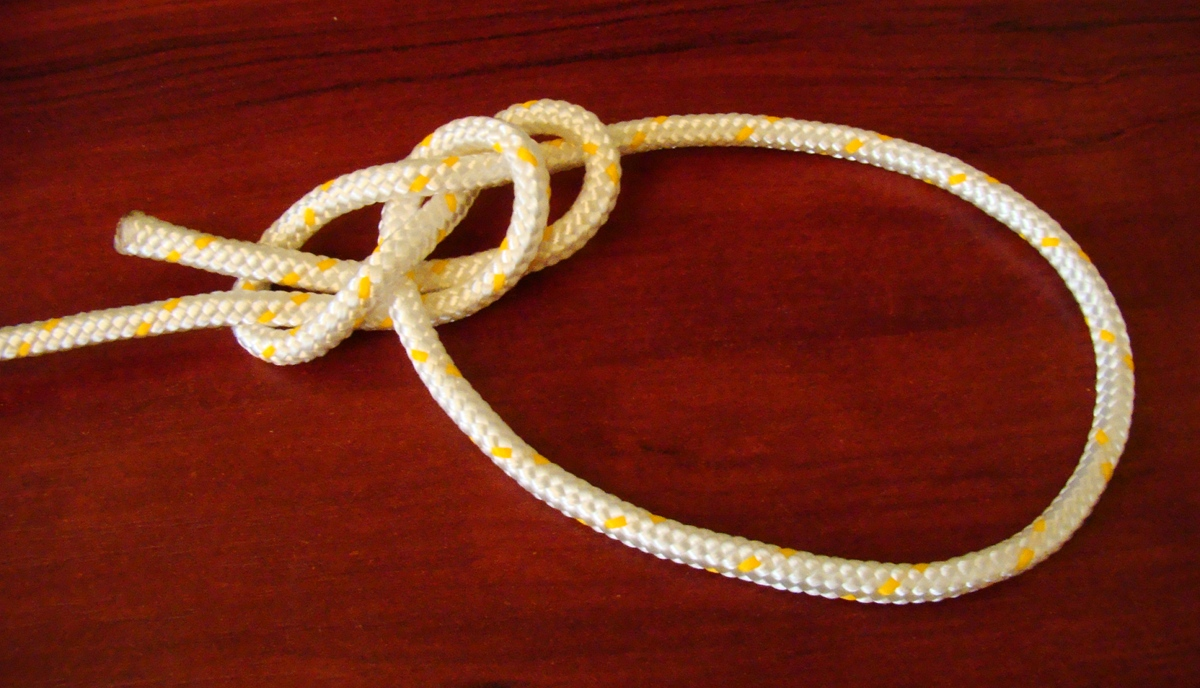
- Names: Yosemite bowline, Bowline with a Yosemite finish
- Category: Loop
- Related: bowline
- Releasing: Non-jamming
- ABoK: #1015, #1436

A Yosemite bowline is a loop knot often perceived as having better security than a bowline. If the knot is not dressed correctly, it can potentially collapse into a noose, however testing reveals this alternative configuration to be strong and safe as a climbing tie-in.

A Yosemite bowline is made from a bowline with the free end wrapped around one leg of the loop and tucked back through the knot, a final round turn and reeve commonly known as a "Yosemite finish." The knot's security is enhanced by preventing the bowline capsizing to form a highly dangerous slip knot. Additional safety is achieved by tying with a tail (see below). When finished, the working end forms a figure eight.

Because of the danger of incorrectly dressing the Yosemite bowline and capsizing it even before it is set, it may be safer and less error-prone to use a standard or double bowline with a backup stopper knot added to the tail, such as a double overhand knot tied around the loop.

The Yosemite finish can be applied to other bowline variants, such as the double bowline.

While the knot's versatility suggests it as a convenient tie-in for attaching a climbing rope to a climber's harness, the figure-of-eight follow through is the most common choice because it is more widely known and more easily checked. The Mountaineering Handbook is one of the few texts that suggest that the Yosemite bowline is better for this purpose. Suggested benefits of the bowline include being easier to untie after loading or when wet and frozen, and being possible to tie-in with only one hand. Testing found it a strong knot for the purpose.

It is recommended that any knot which is used to attach a rope to a safety harness is always finished with a stopper knot. A stopper knot, while serving to keep the loose end tidy, will only help to prevent failure of the primary knot, and does not act as a secondary safety knot by itself. It is sometimes said that if enough of a tail is left to tie a stopper knot, the stopper becomes unnecessary. The tail should be a minimum of 10cm but depends on the thickness of the rope.

== Tying ==
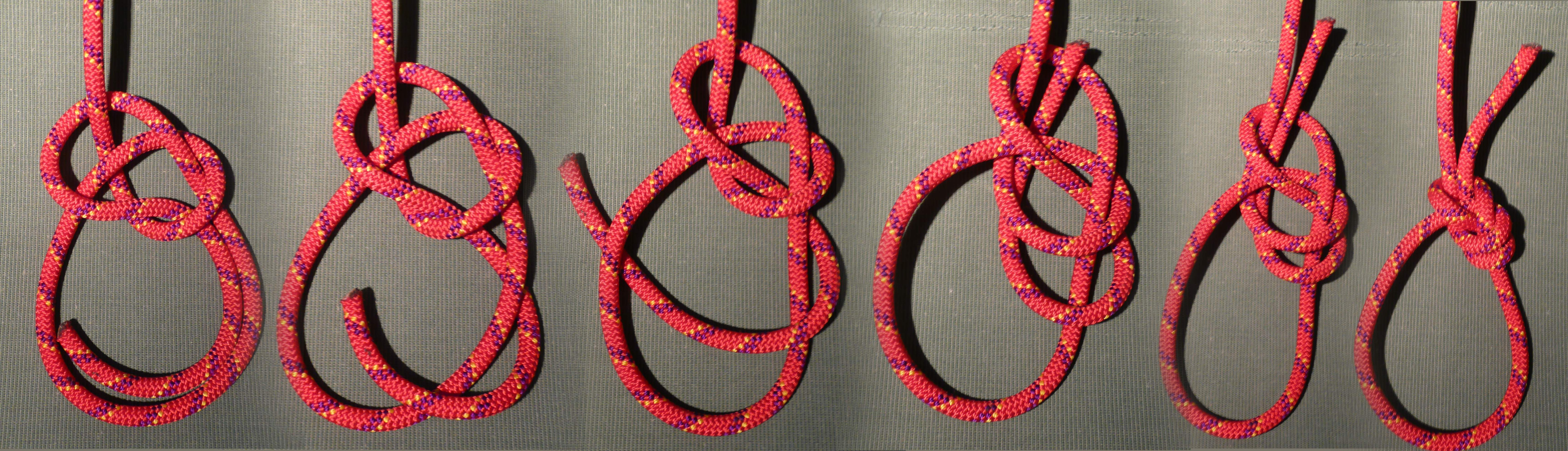
How to knot the Yosemite bowline

== See also ==
- List of knots
