= Jeanne Immink =

Dutch mountain climber

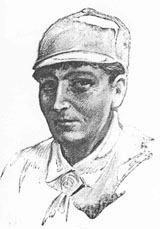
Portrait of Jeanne Immink, c. 1890s

Jeannette Friederike Hermine Immink (née Diest; 10 October 1853 – 20 August 1929) was a Dutch mountaineer. She climbed extensively in the Dolomites with several first ascents and is credited as a pioneer in the field of women's climbing.

== Early life ==
Jeanne Immink was born into a German-Jewish family in Amsterdam in 1853, the eldest daughter of Friedrich "Frederik" Diest and Hermina Heijbroek. After her father died, Immink's mother and three sisters suffered financially; to escape her poverty Jeanne married Johannes Carolus "Karel" Immink after finishing high school, with whom she migrated to Pretoria, South Africa. They had one son together before Jeanne began an affair with Henry Percy Douglas-Willan, a British dragoon captain stationed in Pretoria, and followed him to India, leaving her husband and son in South Africa. When Immink fell pregnant again, she relocated to Switzerland since British officers were not permitted to marry or have children before the age of 30. In Switzerland, she became financially independent as she received significant funds from Douglas-Willan to support their son, Louis Immink.

== Career ==
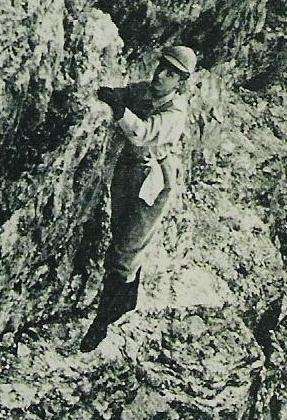
Immink on the Kleine Zinne, 1893

Immink began climbing in the Dolomites shortly after moving to Switzerland. She made her first major climb in 1889 as she ascended a new route on the Ortler in South Tyrol with a guide. The same year, she made the first female ascent of the Antelao. In 1891 she ascended the Schmitt Chimney of Fünffingerspitze in the Langkofel Group, a year after Robert-Hans Schmitt made the first ascent and expressed doubt that the route would ever be climbed again. She climbed an as-yet unnamed and unclimbed mountain in the Dolomites in 1891 which has since been named the Cima Immink. In 1893, German climber and photographer Theodor Wundt asked Immink if she would accompany him on an ascent of the Kleine Zinne (Cima Piccola) of the Tre Cime di Lavaredo; his photographs of her were later published in his book Wanderungen in den Ampezzaner Dolomiten. This would be her final expedition before she retired from climbing in 1894, having sustained an injury from a previous trip.

Although her climbing career spanned only five years, Immink made over 70 climbs and earned a reputation for choosing the most difficult peaks and routes of the time and attracting the respect of her male peers. She was well aware of her role as a leading woman climber, and wrote after one climb: "I challenge the male mountaineers to follow in my steps." She was a member of the Austrian Alpine Club and the Club Alpino Italiano.

== Legacy ==
Immink was the subject of a biography published by journalist Harry Muré in 2003, titled Jeanne Immink: Die Frau, die in die Wolken stieg ("Jeanne Immink: The Woman Who Climbs in the Clouds"). Muré wrote that Immink noted her pioneering role in women's alpinism, writing that she "achieved glory and honor in the male-dominated field of Alpine mountaineering". She was the first female climber to wear pants rather than a skirt, and is credited with the invention of the climbing harness.

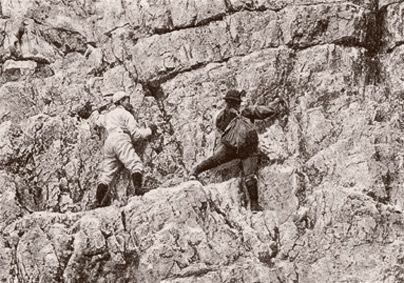
Immink (left) climbing in the Dolomites

Two peaks are named after Immink: the Cima Immink and Campanile Giovanna ("Jeanne's Tower"), which stand next to each other in the Dolomites.
