= Water bowline =

Type of knot designed for use in wet conditions

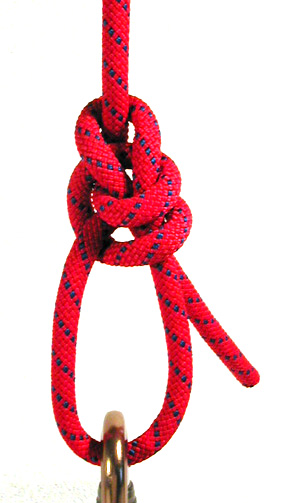
- Category: Loop
- Related: double bowline
- Releasing: Non-jamming
- Typical use: Wet conditions
- ABoK: #1012

The water bowline is a type of knot designed for use in wet conditions where other knots may slip or jam.

Although similar in finished appearance to the double bowline, the water bowline is formed with a clove hitch as the loop in the standing part of the rope. This is similar to the double bowline, which puts the running end through a round turn. The additional friction from the clove hitch increases the security of this knot.

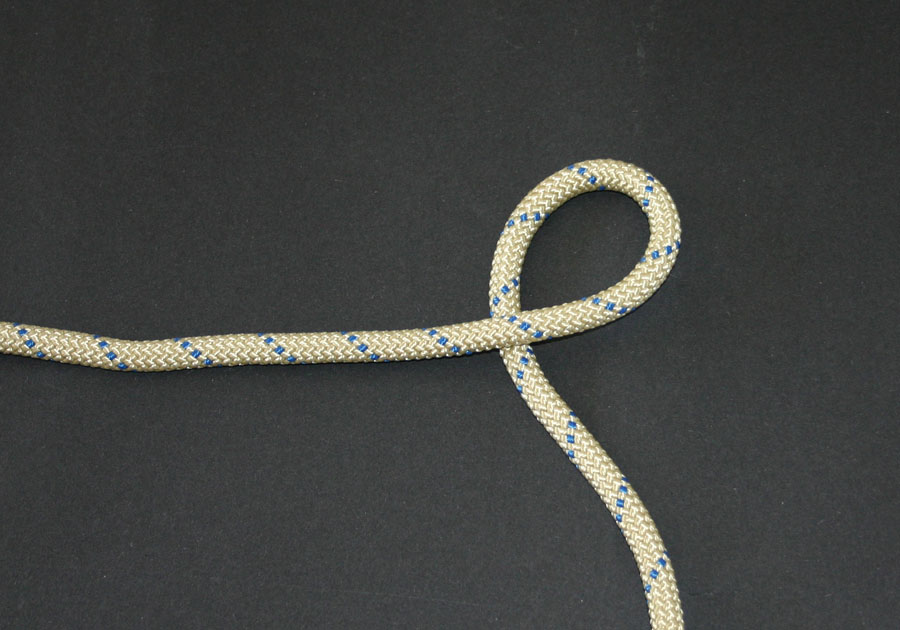
1. Make a half hitch

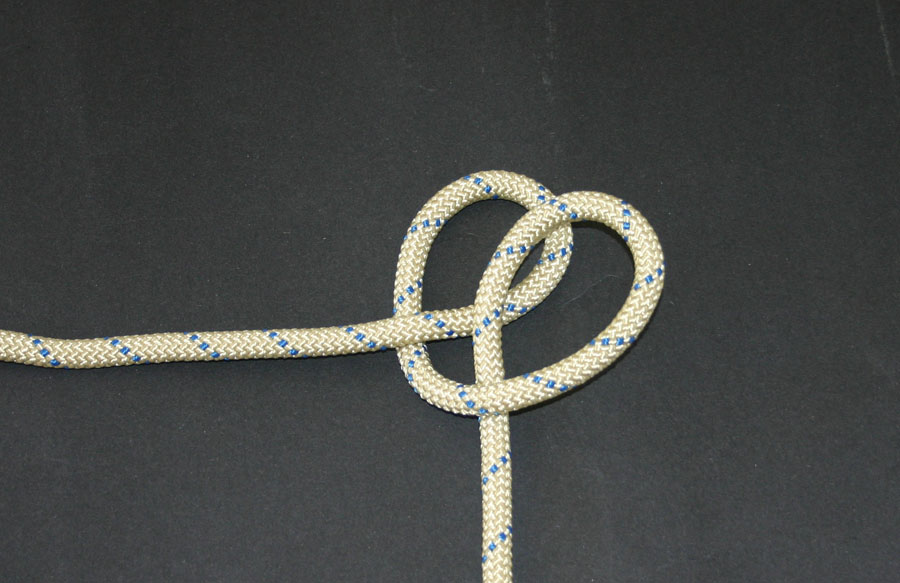
2. Complete the clove hitch
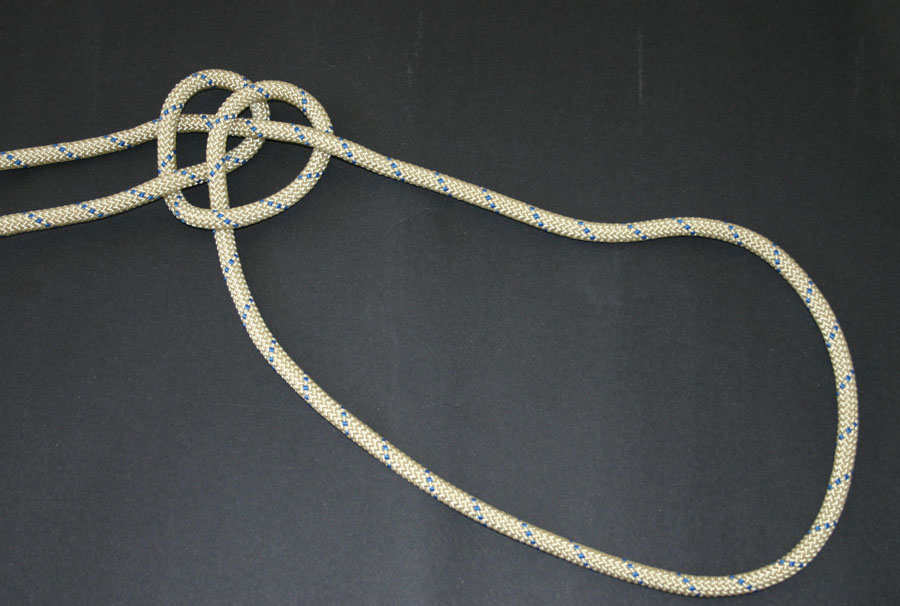
3. Through the clove hitch

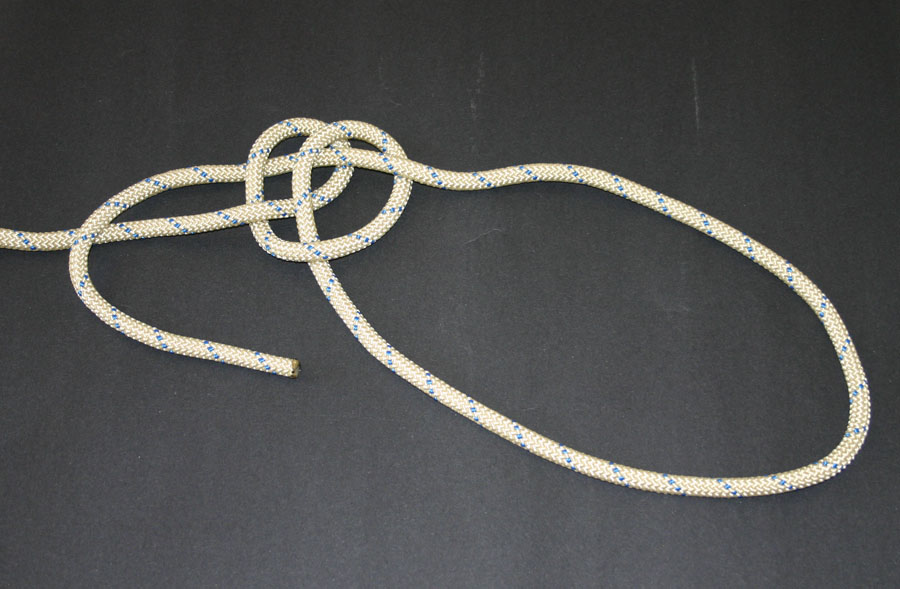
4. Around standing end

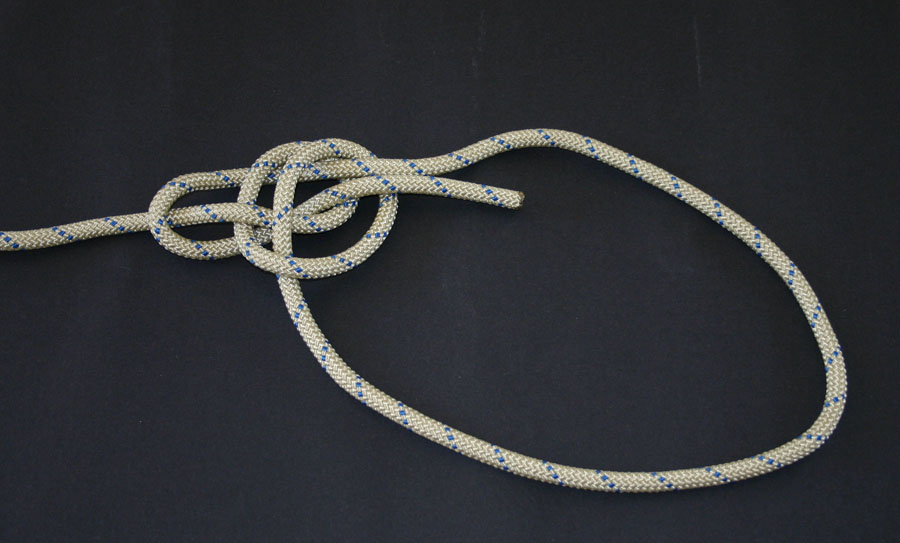
5. Back through hitches

The Water Bowline can be tied very quickly by throwing two half hitches over the working end and then running the working end around the standing line and back through both half hitches. This is illustrated in the three pictures below.

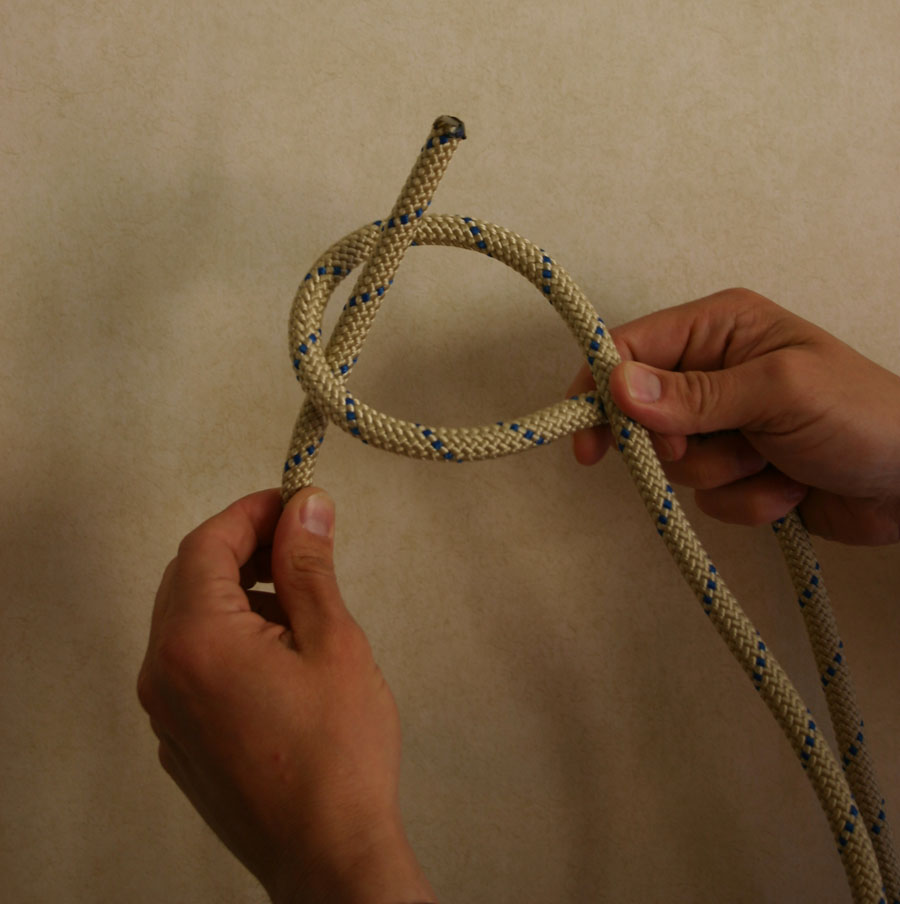
Throw the first hitch

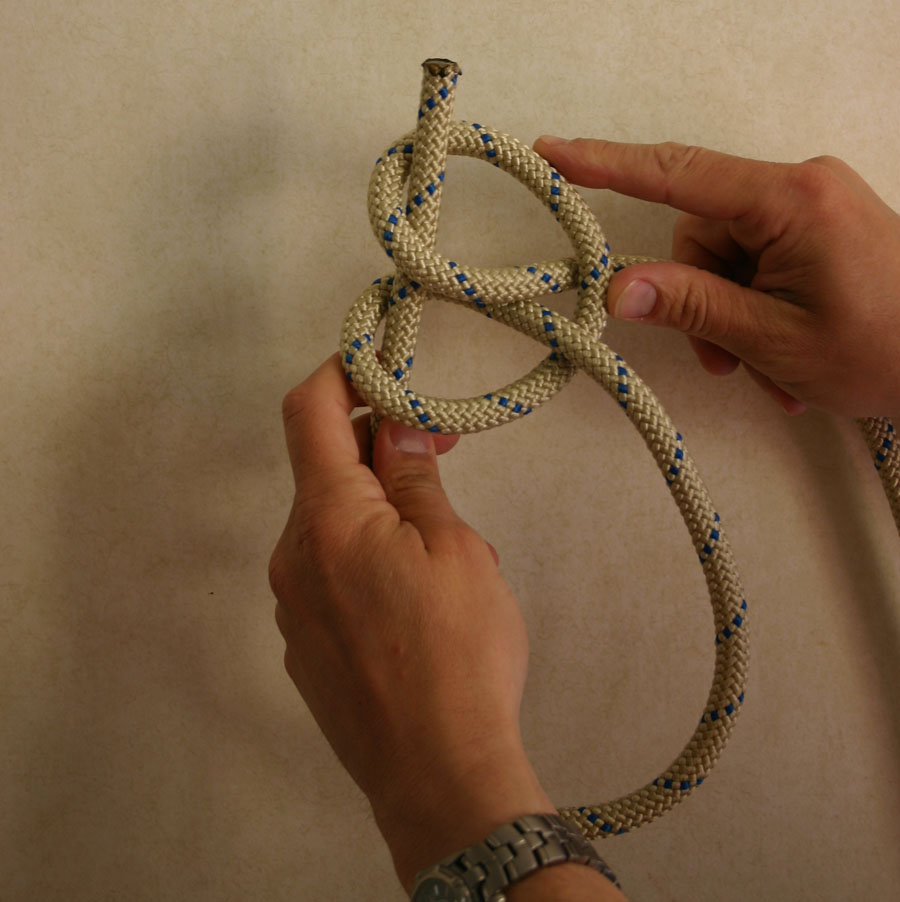
Throw the second hitch

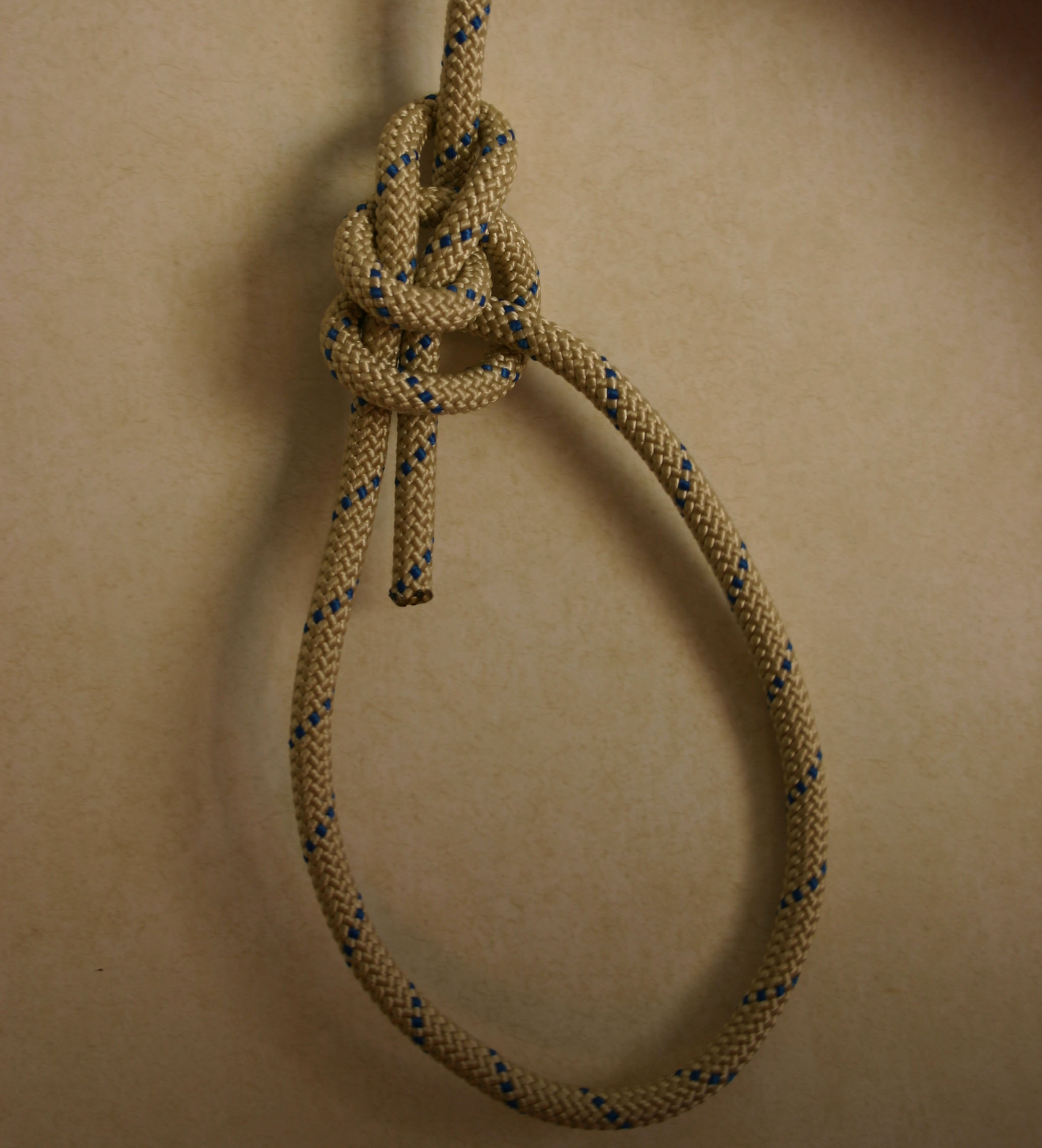
Complete the knot

== See also ==
- List of knots
