= Stevedore knot =

Type of knot

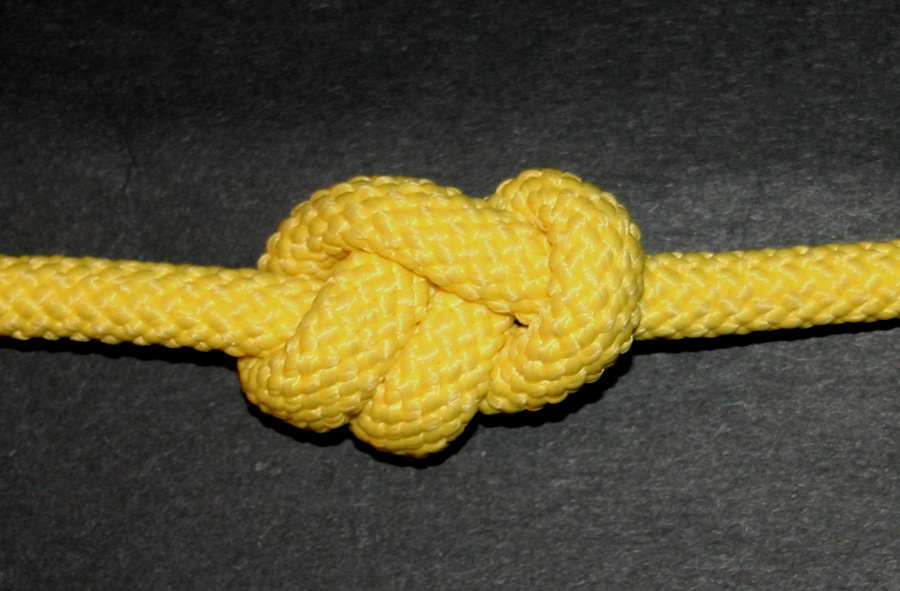
- Names: Stevedore knot, Double figure eight
- Category: Stopper
- Related: Figure-eight knot, Overhand knot, Figure-of-nine loop, Ashley's stopper knot
- Releasing: Non-jamming
- Typical use: To provide a bulky, secure-when-slack stopper
- ABoK: #456, #522

The stevedore knot is a stopper knot, often tied near the end of a rope. It is more bulky and less prone to jamming than the closely related figure-eight knot.

The bight is given one more half turn than in the former knot [which itself is given, "one additional half twist," more than the figure-eight knot], before the end is finally stuck. -- The Ashley Book of Knots

== Naming ==
In The Art of Knotting & Splicing, Cyrus Day explains that "the name originated in a pamphlet issued about 1890 by the C.W. Hunt Company, which sold rope under the name 'Stevedore'. It was subsequently adopted by dictionaries, engineers' handbooks, and other works of reference, and it is now firmly established in books, if not in the vocabulary of seamen."

Despite this history, many sources, including The Ashley Book of Knots, presume that the knot was used by stevedores in their work loading and unloading ships.

The apparent aspect of the knot favored by transmission-line workers (to which the Hunt pamphlet was targeted) is the knot's remaining easily untied after heavy loading. It should also be noted that the extra wrap that it has over the figure 8 stopper will, with flexible cordage, give better security when set.

== Tying ==
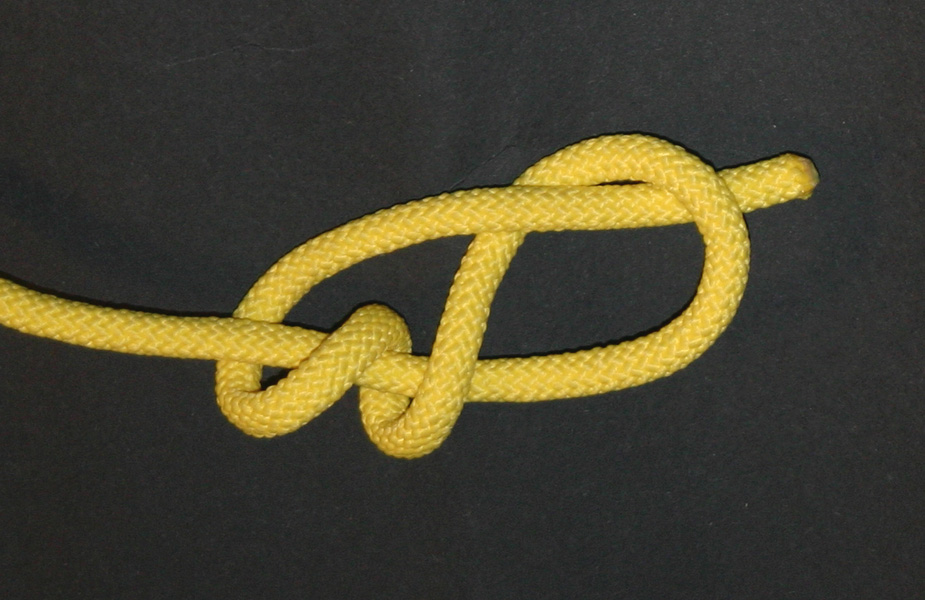
Stevedore knot before tightening

The knot is formed by following the steps to make a figure-of-eight knot, but the working end makes an additional wrap around the standing part before passing back through the initial loop in the same direction it would have for a figure-of-eight knot (which yields a more secure & stable knot than were it to be a half-wrap less (a "Fig.9")).

== See also ==
- List of knots
- Figure-of-nine loop
