= Bowline on a bight =

Knot that makes a pair of fixed-size loops in the middle of a rope

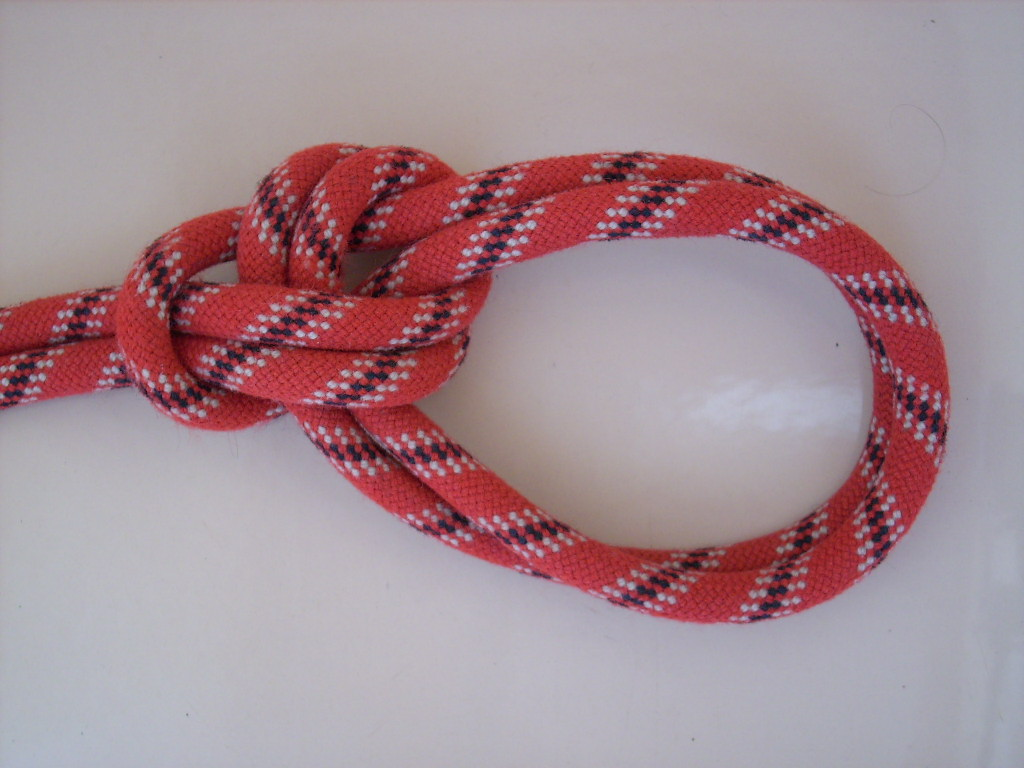
- Category: Loop
- Related: Double bowline
- Releasing: Non-jamming
- Typical use: Forming a loop in the middle of a length of rope.
- ABoK: #1080

The bowline on a bight is a knot which makes a pair of fixed-size loops in the middle of a rope. Its advantage is that it is reasonably easy to untie after being exposed to load. It is one of the two tie-in knots that are being taught by the German Alpine Club (DAV), generally being considered secure.

== Dangers ==
2011 testing shows that the knot might slip when only one loop is loaded. Cavers and canyoneers ought to fasten their cow-tail carabiner through both loops. European cavers widely advocate the use of a figure eight twisted version of the bowline on a bight.

== Applications ==
This knot can be used to provide a toe hold in the middle of a rope; to make an emergency bosun's chair; and to create an upper rope "block" to make a crude purchase by threading the rope round an anchor point and then back up through the loop. It is sometimes used in sport climbing to tie into two anchor bolts independently. This knot is convenient when a dependable loop is required but neither end of the line is available. It's also commonly used as a seat while being hoisted as there are two secure loops as opposed to the traditional one loop bowline. In theory, this knot would make hoisting many people with one line possible. This knot is very popular in caving as it allows the load to be spread between two anchor points, reducing the stress placed on them and providing a backup should one fail. Commonly known as the Y-hang it allows for a free-hang descent and can be easily adjusted to avoid waterfalls or rub points.

As mentioned earlier, this knot can replace the figure-eight knot when tying into a climbing harness by tying a regular bowline knot and then re-threading it, such as is done with a figure eight knot. However, it is critical to use a strong backup knot with plenty of tail beyond the knot, as the knot may untie during long climbs. The advantage of using this knot instead of the figure eight knot is that it can be easily untied after a severe fall.

== See also ==
- Double bowline
- List of knots
