= Figure-eight knot =

Type of stopper knot used in sailing and climbing

- Names: Figure-eight knot, figure-of-eight knot, Savoy knot, Flemish knot, double stopper
- Category: Stopper
- Efficiency: 80%
- Origin: Ancient
- Related: Stevedore knot, figure-eight loop, figure-eight follow through, directional figure eight
- Releasing: Jamming
- Typical use: General-purpose stopper knot. Replaces the common overhand knot in many uses.
- ABoK: #420 #520 #570
- Conway Notation: 2 2
- A/B notation: 4_{1}
- Instructions

The figure-eight knot or figure-of-eight knot is a type of stopper knot. It is very important in sailing, rock climbing and caving as a method of stopping ropes from running out of retaining devices. Like the overhand knot, which will jam under strain, often requiring the rope to be cut, the figure-eight will also jam, but is usually more easily undone than the overhand knot.

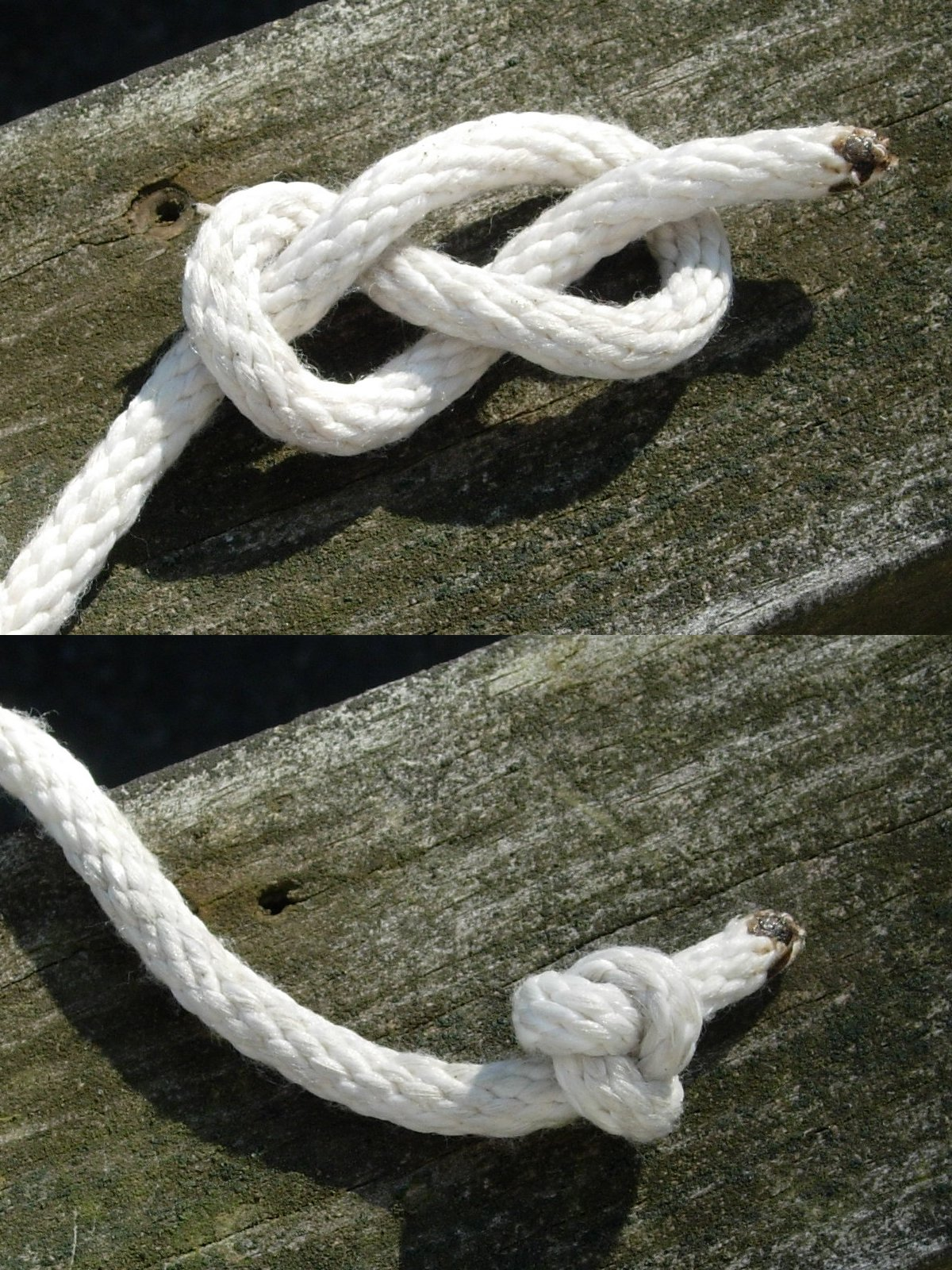
When used as a stopper knot, the figure eight takes a more compact tightened form.

The figure-eight or figure-of-eight knot is also called (in books) the Flemish knot. The name figure-of-eight knot appears in Lever's Sheet Anchor; or, a Key to Rigging (London, 1808). The word "of" is nowadays usually omitted. The knot is the sailor's common single-strand stopper knot and is tied in the ends of tackle falls and running rigging, unless the latter is fitted with monkey's tails. It is used about ship wherever a temporary stopper knot is required. The figure-eight is much easier to untie than the overhand, it does not have the same tendency to jam and so injure the fiber, and is larger, stronger, and equally secure.

— The Ashley Book of Knots

The stevedore knot is an extension of simple figure-eight knot with an additional turn before the end is finally tightened.

== Different types ==
=== Figure-eight loop ===
The figure-eight loop is frequently used in climbing. It is the most common knot used to attach a rope to a harness, sometimes being described as the most important knot in the sport. It forms a strong knot that’s relatively easy to tie, although can be difficult to untie after heavy loading.

=== Figure-eight bend ===
The figure-eight bend knot is used to "splice" together two ropes, not necessarily of equal diameter. This knot is tied starting with a loose figure-eight knot on one rope (the larger-diameter one if unequal), and threading of the other rope's running end through the first figure eight, starting at the first figure-eight's running end and paralleling the path of the first rope through the figure eight until the second's ropes running end lies parallel against the firsts standing end. The result is two figure-eight knots, each partly inside the other and tightening its hold on the other when they are pulled in opposite directions. This can be a permanent or temporary splice. While it precludes the ropes' slipping relative to each other, it is a typical knot in having less strength than the straight ropes.

=== Offset figure-eight bend ===
The offset figure-eight bend is a poor knot that has been implicated in the deaths of several rock climbers.

=== Stein knot ===
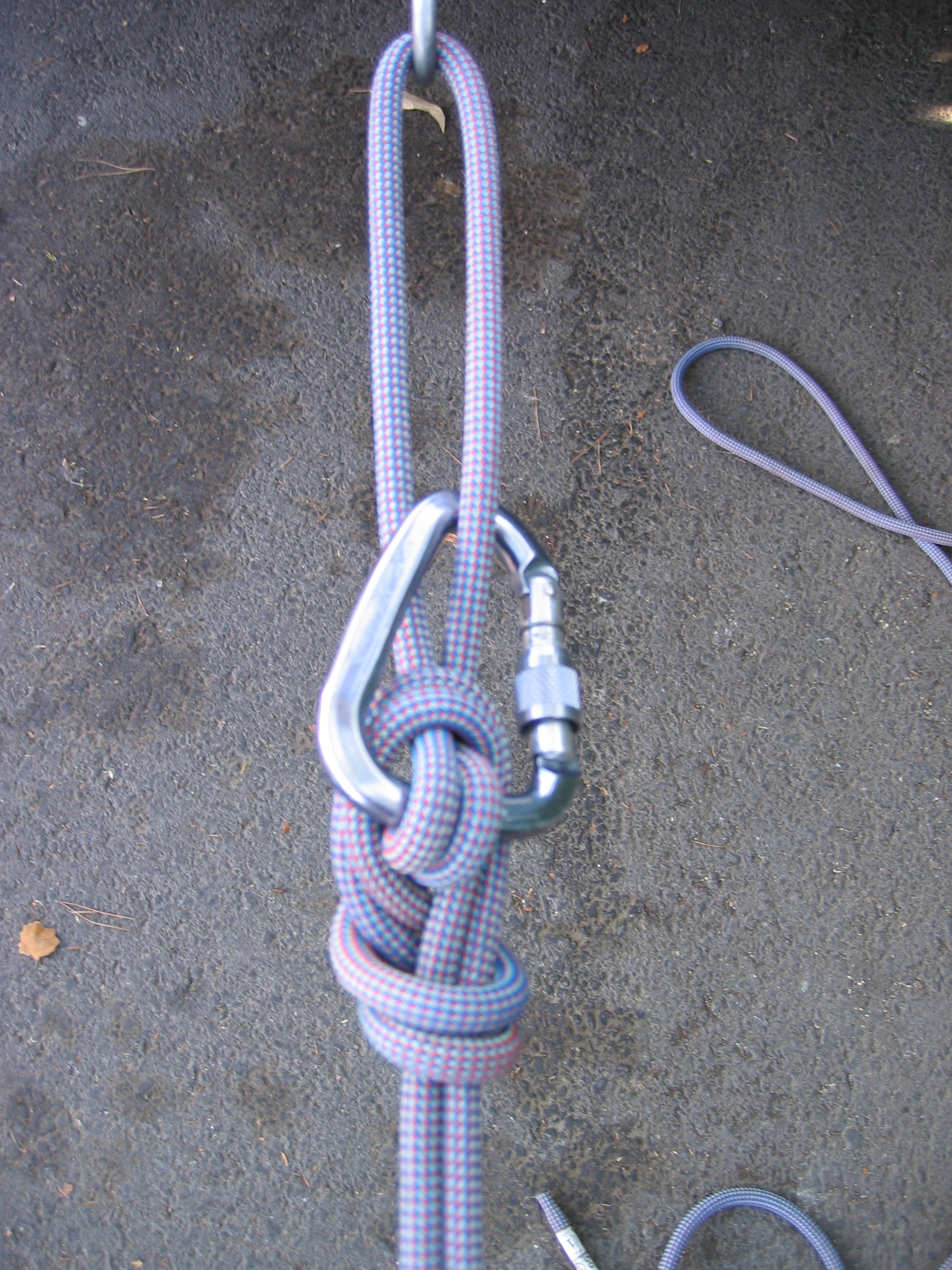
Stein knot

The stein knot (also known as a stone knot) is a variation of the figure-eight knot. It is used to secure a rope that is already passed around a post or through a ring. It is quick and easy to tie and untie. It is a device rigging rather than a true knot. In canyoneering, it is used to isolate rope strands to allow one person to rappel while another is getting on the rappel, or allow rappellers the option of using a single or a double rope. It is also used in basketmaking.

== Symbolic use ==
- In heraldry, this knot is known as Savoy knot.
- In the United States Navy, a figure-of-eight badge was formerly worn by enlisted men who had successfully completed the apprentice rating.
- In The Scout Association in the United Kingdom, awards for gallantry and long service are represented by a cloth figure-of-eight knot emblem in various colours.

== See also ==
- Figure-eight loop
- Figure-eight knot (mathematics)
- List of knots
