= Double bowline =

Type of loop knot

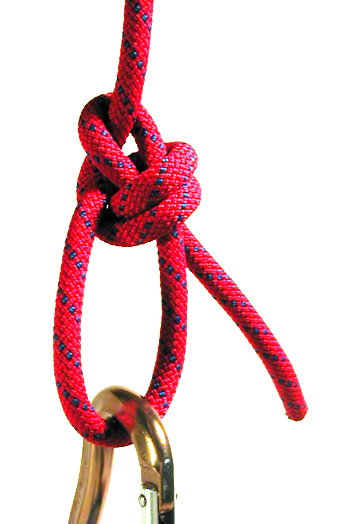
- Names: Double bowline, round turn bowline, double-knotted bowline
- Category: Loop
- Efficiency: 70-75%
- Related: Bowline, water bowline, double sheet bend, bowline on a bight
- Typical use: climbing
- ABoK: #1013

A double bowline (or round turn bowline) is a type of loop knot. Instead of the single turn of the regular bowline, the double bowline uses a round turn. This forms a more secure loop than a standard bowline.

== Naming ==
Though called "double bowline" by Clifford Ashley, this name is also reasonably descriptive of a different knot: the bowline on a bight. Because of this ambiguity some sources differentiate by using one of the alternate names above. And at least one other source uses the name "double bowline" for a mid-line loop knot made by tying a basic bowline with a bight of rope instead of the end.

== Tying ==
First, learn to tie the bowline by laying the working end on the standing part and twisting to form a loop (the "hole" that the rabbit comes out of). Wrap the loop once more around the working end. Then pass the working end behind the standing part and back down through the double loop.

== Uses ==
The double bowline is one of the typical tie-in knots used in climbing, along with the figure eight follow through and the Yosemite bowline. The advantage of the double bowline over the figure 8 is that it is easier to untie after being weighted in a fall, and so is used by sport climbers who take multiple lead falls and then have trouble untying their figure eights. The disadvantages of the double bowline are that it is less secure than a figure eight knot, takes longer to tie, and is not as easy to check. Unlike the figure eight, there are many variations of the bowline, with ambiguous names, and some are not safe for climbing.

The bowline on a bight, when re-threaded instead of being tied on a bight, can also be used for tying into a climbing harness and provides more strength and security than the double bowline.

== See also ==
- List of knots
