= Directional figure eight =

Type of knot

- Names: Directional figure eight, Inline figure-eight loop
- Category: Loop
- ABoK: #1058

Loop up

Loop down

The directional figure eight should be tied in one way or the other depending on which way the loop will be loaded.

The directional figure eight (a.k.a. inline figure-eight loop) is a loop knot. It is a knot that can be made on the bight. The loop must only be loaded in the correct direction or the knot may fail. It is useful on a hauling line to create loops that can be used as handholds. It also provides a place to attach a Z-Drag to the line when prusiks are unavailable.

== See also ==
- Alpine butterfly loop for a loop that is easier to remember and can be loaded in either direction.
- List of knots
