= Figure-eight loop =

Type of knot

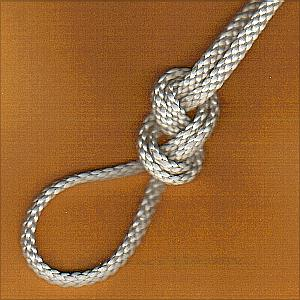
- Names: Figure-eight loop, Flemish loop
- Category: Loop
- Related: figure-eight knot, flemish bend, Figure-of-nine loop, spider hitch
- Releasing: Jamming
- Typical use: climbing, caving
- Caveat: jams
- ABoK: #1047, #531
- Instructions

Figure-eight loop (also figure-eight on a bight, figure-eight follow-through, figure-eight retrace, Flemish loop, or Flemish eight) is a type of knot created by a loop on the bight. It is used in climbing and caving.

The Flemish loop or figure-eight loop is perhaps stronger than the loop knot. Neither of these knots is used at sea, as they are hard to untie. In hooking a tackle to any of the loops, if the loop is long enough it is better to arrange the rope as a cat's paw.

— The Ashley Book of Knots

The double figure eight is used to put a loop in the end of a rope, or around an object. It is relatively easy to tie and is secure, but can become difficult to untie after heavy loading, and can jam badly in any rope type.

== Tying methods ==
=== On a bight ===
A figure-of-eight loop tied using the follow-through method.

A figure-eight loop is created by doubling the rope into a bight, then tying the standard figure-eight knot.

In climbing, this knot is used to save time when repeatedly attaching the rope to climbing harnesses, using locking carabiners, such as when a group of people are climbing on the same top-rope.

=== Follow-through ===
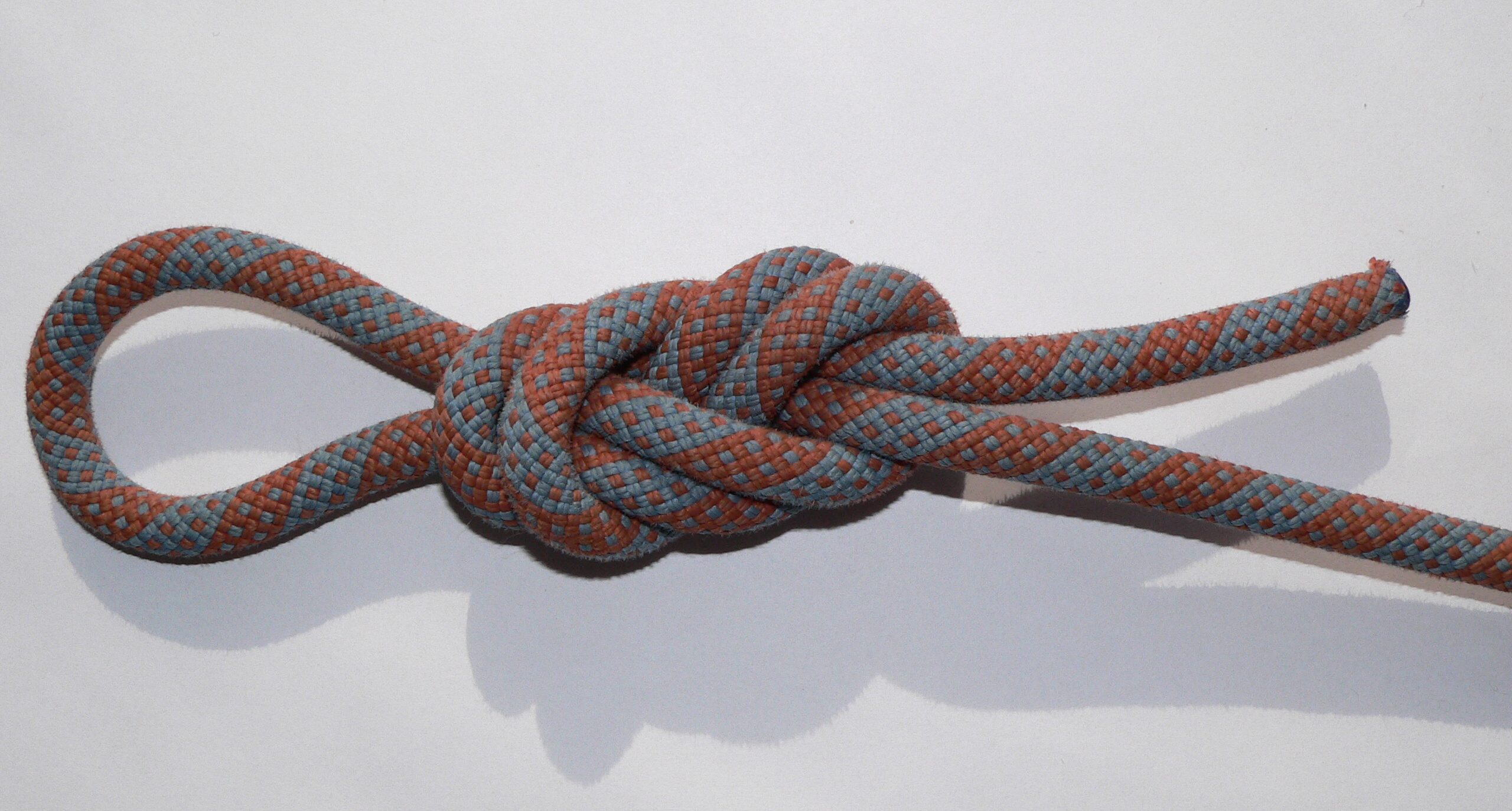
A well-dressed figure-eight follow-through after tightening

Alternatively, to tie the knot directly around an object, the follow-through method must be used.

- Tie a regular figure eight knot with a significant amount of extra tail.
- Loop the tail around the object.
- Thread the tail back through the figure eight to create a normal looking figure eight on a bight.

==== Climbing ====
This is the standard method for attaching a rope to a climbing harness.

Often an additional strangle knot (which is half of a double fisherman's knot) "backup knot" is tied in the tail of the figure 8. This is not required for the knot's integrity during climbing, but could prevent ring-loading failure if belaying from the rope loop (instead of a dedicated belay loop). It also ensures that adequate tail length has been included, and gets excess tail out of the way. If the finish knot is not included, the tail should be 4 to 8 inches long. The tail can also be tucked back into the knot, called a "Yosemite finish" or "Yosemite tuck". This holds the bottom loop open, making the knot easier to untie after falling, but also making it weaker in a ring-loading configuration.

The diameter of the loop should be kept small to avoid being caught on protrusions or clipped into accidentally while climbing. A well-dressed knot has a symmetrical appearance, with the strands parallel through each curve.

== See also ==
- Directional figure-eight knot
- List of knots
